= Charles Hill, Botswana =

Village in Ghanzi District of Botswana

Coordinates: 22°16′35″S 20°05′34″E

Location of Charles Hill

Charles Hill is a village in Ghanzi District of Botswana. It is located close to the Namibian border. Charles Hill is the second-largest village in the Ghanzi District, with a population of 3,791 according to the 2011 census.

Charles Hill is the seat of the Charles Hill sub-District, established separately from Ghanzii District administratively in 2004. Although the limits of the sub-district have as yet to be clearly defined it generally is bordered to the north by the Trans-Kalahari Highway, the west by Namibia, to the east by Botswana Highway A2 and to the south by Kgalagadi District. The inhabitants are made up of a variety of different groups living side by side and in harmony with each other, they are:

- Herero
- Bakgalagadi
- Basarwa
- Batlharo (a biracial tribe of the coloreds and herero whose mother-tongue is Setswana)
- Coloureds
- Nama

Some of the developments in the village include a primary school, a junior secondary school, a hospital, a post office, some Rural Administration Centre offices which belong to the local government (known as the council), pre-schools, hair salons and an Engen filling station which is conveniently located next to the main tarred road from Ghanzi to Mamuno. An estimated 200 cattle posts lie within the sub-District but outside village limits.

== Villages ==
There are eight villages and two settlements lying within the sub-District:

- Chobokwane
- Tsootsha (also known as Kalkfontein)
- Karakubis
- Kanagas
- New Xanagas
- Charles Hill
- Makunda
- Ncojane
- Metsimantsho
- Metsimantle

== Politics ==
Charles Hill is part of the Charleshill constituency for elections to the National Assembly of Botswana.
