= Ghanzi (Botswana constituency) =

Parliamentary constituency in Botswana, 2024 onwards

- Single-member constituency for the National Assembly
- District: Ghanzi
- Population: 39,032
- Major settlements: Ghanzi
- Area: 99,940 km^{2}

Current constituency
- Created: 2024
- Party: UDC
- Created from: Ghanzi North; Ghanzi South
- MP: Noah Salakae
- Margin of victory: 2,880 (20.9 pp)

Ghanzi is a constituency in the Ghanzi District which is represented in the National Assembly of Botswana. The seat was created after the 2022 Delimitation of Parliamentary constituencies and was first contested at the 2024 general election. It has since been represented by Noah Salakae of the UDC.

== Constituency profile ==
The constituency is the largest in the country and is predominantly rural. It encompasses the following localities:

1. Ghanzi
2. D’kar
3. Kuke
4. New Xade
5. Chobokwane
6. East Hanahai
7. West Hanahai
8. Central Kgalagadi Game Reserve
9. Qabo
10. Grootlaagte
11. Bere
12. Kacqae

== Members of Parliament ==
Key: UDC

Election	Winner
2024 election	Noah Salakae

== Election results ==
=== 2024 election ===
General election 2024: Ghanzi
Party	Candidate	Votes	%
UDC	Noah Salakae	7,575	54.90
BDP	John Thiite	4,695	34.02
BPF	Saul Isaac	1,529	11.08
Margin of victory		2,880	20.87
Total valid votes		13,799	98.82
Rejected ballots		165	1.18
Turnout		13,964	79.52
Registered electors		17,561	
UDC notional gain from BDP			
