= Charleshill (Botswana constituency) =

Parliamentary constituency in Botswana, 2024 onwards

- Single-member constituency for the National Assembly
- District: Ghanzi
- Population: 17,581
- Major settlements: Charleshill
- Area: 14,919 km^{2}

Current constituency
- Created: 2024
- Party: UDC
- Created from: Ghanzi South
- MP: Motsamai Motsamai
- Margin of victory: 295 (3.7 pp)

Charleshill is a constituency in the Ghanzi District which is represented in the National Assembly of Botswana. The seat was created after the 2022 Delimitation of Parliamentary constituencies and was first contested at the 2024 general election. It has since been represented by Motsamai Motsamai of the UDC.

== Constituency profile ==
The constituency, predominantly rural and anchored around parts of Kanye encompasses the following localities:

1. Charleshill
2. Xanagas
3. Kole
4. Makunda
5. Ncojane
6. New Xanagas
7. Karakobis
8. Tsootshaa
9. Metsimantsho
10. Metsimantle

== Members of Parliament ==
Key: UDC

Election	Winner
2024 election	Motsamai Motsamai

== Election results ==
=== 2024 election ===
General election 2024: Charleshill
Party	Candidate	Votes	%
UDC	Motsamai Motsamai	3,248	41.07
BDP	Thato Tshweneyagae	2,953	37.34
BCP	Congo Puratenee	1,570	19.85
BPF	Linda Segwai	137	1.73
Margin of victory		295	3.73
Total valid votes		7,908	99.37
Rejected ballots		50	0.63
Turnout		7,958	85.56
Registered electors		9,301	
UDC notional gain from BDP			
