= Hanahai =

Hanahai may refer to:

- East Hanahai, Botswana
- West Hanahai, Botswana
