= Gert Alberts =

19th-century Boer explorer

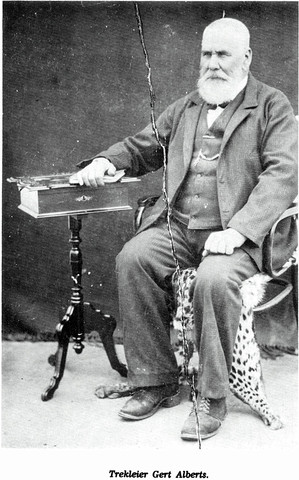
Gert Alberts

Gert Andries Jacobus Alberts (born 3 January 1836 in Swellendam – died 29 March 1927 in Humpata) was the leader of the First Dorsland Trek. He was a member of the Gereformeerde Kerk (or 'Dopper' church) and served as a church elder (‘kerkraadslid’).

Elected leader of the trekkers, he left Pretoria on 27 May 1874. Alberts led ten families across the Kalahari, taking 50 oxwagons and 1,400 cattle with them. He split the trek in three groups, with a two-day interval between them, to avoid overcrowding the rare waterholes along the path. Three families turned back before they crossed the Kgalagadi Desert, where a handful of cattle were lost during the waterless journey.

Reaching Lake Ngami on 29 April 1875, they demanded Hendrik van Zyl, a trader based in Ghanzi with a reputation for ruthlessness, access to his wells, but he initially refused. He ultimately agreed to let them have water, and the trekkers continued to Rietfontein, on the border with German Southwest Africa.

The group arrived in Rietfontein in January 1876, and Andries Lambert, the Oorlams captain at Gobabis, granted them permission to stay. They remained for a year, leaving only when they received a call for help from the second party of Dorsland Trekkers; they had attempted to cross the Kgalagadi with 500 people in 128 wagons, more than could be supported by the desert environment. Alberts and his group managed to rescue some of them, and they continued their trek, reaching Okavango, where they were struck by malaria.

Over a period of five years, the survivors arrived in the Humpata Highlands, in present-day Angola; where Alberts died in 1927.
