= 1874 =

1874 in various calendars
- Gregorian calendar: 1874; MDCCCLXXIV
- Ab urbe condita: 2627
- Armenian calendar: 1323; ԹՎ ՌՅԻԳ
- Assyrian calendar: 6624
- Baháʼí calendar: 30–31
- Balinese saka calendar: 1795–1796
- Bengali calendar: 1280–1281
- Berber calendar: 2824
- British Regnal year: 37 Vict. 1 – 38 Vict. 1
- Buddhist calendar: 2418
- Burmese calendar: 1236
- Byzantine calendar: 7382–7383
- Chinese calendar: 癸酉年 (Water Rooster); 4571 or 4364 — to — 甲戌年 (Wood Dog); 4572 or 4365
- Coptic calendar: 1590–1591
- Discordian calendar: 3040
- Ethiopian calendar: 1866–1867
- Hebrew calendar: 5634–5635
- Hindu calendars
- Vikram Samvat: 1930–1931
- Shaka Samvat: 1795–1796
- Kali Yuga: 4974–4975
- Holocene calendar: 11874
- Igbo calendar: 874–875
- Iranian calendar: 1252–1253
- Islamic calendar: 1290–1291
- Japanese calendar: Meiji 7 (明治７年)
- Javanese calendar: 1802–1803
- Julian calendar: Gregorian minus 12 days
- Korean calendar: 4207
- Minguo calendar: 38 before ROC 民前38年
- Nanakshahi calendar: 406
- Thai solar calendar: 2416–2417
- Tibetan calendar: ཆུ་མོ་བྱ་ལོ་ (female Water-Bird); 2000 or 1619 or 847 — to — ཤིང་ཕོ་ཁྱི་ལོ་ (male Wood-Dog); 2001 or 1620 or 848

1874 (MDCCCLXXIV) was a common year starting on Thursday of the Gregorian calendar and a common year starting on Tuesday of the Julian calendar, the 1874th year of the Common Era (CE) and Anno Domini (AD) designations, the 874th year of the 2nd millennium, the 74th year of the 19th century, and the 5th year of the 1870s decade. As of the start of 1874, the Gregorian calendar was 12 days ahead of the Julian calendar, which remained in localized use until 1923.

== Events ==
=== January ===
- January 1 – New York City annexes The Bronx.
- January 2 – Ignacio María González becomes head of state of the Dominican Republic for the first time.
- January 3 – Third Carlist War: Battle of Caspe – Campaigning on the Ebro in Aragon for the Spanish Republican Government, Colonel Eulogio Despujol surprises a Carlist force under Manuel Marco de Bello at Caspe, northeast of Alcañiz. In a brilliant action the Carlists are routed, losing 200 prisoners and 80 horses, while Despujol is promoted to Brigadier and becomes Conde de Caspe.
- January 20 – The Pangkor Treaty (also known as the Pangkor Engagement), by which the British extend their control over first the Sultanate of Perak, and later the other independent Malay States, is signed.
- January 23 – Prince Alfred, Duke of Edinburgh, second son of Queen Victoria, marries Grand Duchess Maria Alexandrovna of Russia, only daughter of Tsar Alexander II of Russia, in the Grand Church of the Winter Palace in Saint Petersburg.

=== February ===
- February 21 – The Oakland Daily Tribune publishes its first issue in California.
- February 23 – Walter Clopton Wingfield patents in Britain a game called "sphairistike", more commonly called lawn tennis.
- February 24–25 – Third Carlist War: First Battle of Somorrostro – Determined to raise the siege of Bilbao by the Pretender Don Carlos VII, Republican commander Marshal Francisco Serrano sends General Domingo Moriones with a relief force of 14,000 men. Carlists, under General Nicolás Ollo, entrenched at Somorrostro outside Bilbao, drive back a courageous assault by General Fernando Primo de Rivera and then the entire Republican army. The republicans lose 1,200 men, and Moriones loses his nerve, demanding reinforcements and a replacement for himself. Moriones's men entrench and wait.

=== March ===
- March 14 – Third Carlist War: Battle of Castellfollit de la Roca – Appointed to command the Spanish Republican army in the north, General Ramón Nouvilas attempts to relieve the Carlist siege of Olot in Girona. But at Castellfollit de la Roca, in one of the Government's worst defeats, Nouvilas is routed by Carlist General Francesc Savalls, and captured along with about 2,000 of his men. Olot capitulates two days later.
- March 15 – France and Viet Nam sign the Second Treaty of Saigon, further recognizing the full sovereignty of France over Cochinchina.
- March 18
  - Hawaii signs a treaty with the United States, granting exclusive trading rights.
  - The Dresden English Football Club is founded, the first association football club on the European mainland.
- March 25 – The Republic of Ecuador is consecrated to the Sacred Heart of Jesus, carried out by President Gabriel García Moreno and supported, blessed and specified by Pope Pius IX.
- March 25–27 – Third Carlist War: Second Battle of Somorrostro – In a renewed attempt to raise the siege of Bilbao by Don Carlos VII, Republican commander Marshal Francisco Serrano himself arrives with 27,000 men and 70 cannons. However, in three days of fierce fighting, the Carlist General Joaquín Elío, with just 17,000 men, once again drives off the attack at nearby Somorrostro, and it is another six weeks before Serrano manages to relieve Bilbao.
- March – The Young Men's Hebrew Association in Manhattan (which will still be operating 150 years later as the 92nd Street Y) is founded.

=== April ===
- April 15–May 15 – A group of young painters, Société Anonyme Coopérative des Artistes, Peintres, Sculpteurs, Graveurs, gives their first exhibition, at the studio of the photographer Nadar in Paris. Louis Leroy's critical review of it published on 25 April gives rise to the term Impressionism for the movement, with reference to Claude Monet's Impression, Sunrise.

=== May ===
- May 2 – Third Carlist War: The siege of Bilbao is lifted.
- May 9 – The first commercial horse-drawn carriage debuts in the city of Bombay, plying two routes.
- May 14 – First admission charge at a football game: Harvard beats University of McGill (Montreal) 3–0.
- May 16 – The Mill River dam collapses in Massachusetts, killing 139 people.
- May 22 – Verdi's Requiem is first performed at San Marco in Milan, marking the first anniversary of Manzoni's death.
- May 23 – Passenger ship British Admiral, on a voyage from Liverpool (England) to Melbourne (Australia), sinks after hitting rocks off King Island (Tasmania); only nine of the 88 passengers and crew are rescued.
- May 27 – The first group of Dorsland Trekkers, a series of expeditions by Trekboere in search of political independence and better farming conditions, departs South Africa to settle in Angola, led by Gert Alberts.

=== June ===
- June 14 – Michel Domingue becomes head of state of Haiti.
- June 22 – Andrew Taylor Still starts the movement for osteopathic medicine in the United States at Kirksville, Missouri.
- June 25–27 – Third Carlist War: Battle of Monte Muro – Carlist forces entrenched around Abárzuza, on the approach to Estella in Navarre, repel an attack by Isabelino/Liberal (supporters of Queen Isabella II) troops led by General Manuel Gutiérrez de la Concha, Marqués del Duero, who is killed on the third day of fighting.

=== July ===
- July 1
  - The Universal Postal Union is established.
  - The Philadelphia Zoo opens, the first public zoo in the United States.
  - The Sholes and Glidden typewriter, with cylindrical platen and QWERTY keyboard, is first marketed in the United States.
  - The Bank of Spain issues the first peseta banknotes.
- July 14 – The Chicago Fire of 1874 burns down 47 acres of the city, destroying 812 buildings, killing 20, and resulting in the fire insurance industry demanding municipal reforms from Chicago's city council.
- July 24
  - Mathew Evans and Henry Woodward patent the first incandescent lamp, with an electric light bulb.
  - Third Carlist War: Sack of Cuenca – After Carlist forces successfully defend Estella, Don Alfonso de Bourbon, brother of the Don Carlos VII, leads 14,000 Catalan Carlists south to attack Cuenca (136 km from Madrid), held by Republicans under Don Hilario Lozano. After two days the outnumbered garrison capitulates, but Don Alfonso permits a terrible slaughter. The city is sacked. Subsequently, another republican force defeats the disorderly Catalans, who flee back to the Ebro.
- July 31 – Patrick Francis Healy, S.J., the first Black man to receive a PhD, is inaugurated as president of Georgetown University, the oldest Catholic University in America, and becomes the first Black person to head a predominantly White university.

=== August ===
- August 11 – Third Carlist War: Battle of Oteiza – Two months after Government forces were repulsed from Carlist-held Estella, in Navarre, Republican General Domingo Moriones makes a fresh diversionary attack a few miles to the southeast at Oteiza. In heavy fighting Moriones secures a costly tactical victory over Carlist General Torcuato Mendíri, but the war continues another 18 months, before Estella finally falls.

=== September ===
- September 9 – Captain Lyman's wagon train besieged by Indians in Hemphill County, Texas.
- September 14 – Battle of Liberty Place: In New Orleans, former Confederate Army members of the White League temporarily drive Republican Governor William P. Kellogg from office, replacing him with former Democratic Governor John McEnery. U.S. Army troops restore Kellogg to office five days later.
- September 28 – Texas–Indian wars: U.S. Army Colonel Ranald S. Mackenzie leads his force of 600 men on the successful raid of the last sanctuary of the Kiowa, Comanche and Cheyenne Indian tribes, a village inside the Palo Duro Canyon in Texas, and carries out their removal to the designated Indian reservations in Oklahoma.

=== October ===
- October 9
  - The Treaty of Bern establishes the General Postal Union, to coordinate the exchange of international mail.
  - The San Diego Society of Natural History, originator of the San Diego Natural History Museum, is founded in California.
- October 19 – The modern University of Zagreb is founded.
- October 31 – The Quebra-Quilos Revolt starts in Paraíba, Empire of Brazil.

=== November ===
- November 2 – The first issue of Japanese-language newspaper Yomiuri Shimbun is published in Tokyo, Japan.
- November 4 – Democrats gain control of the United States House of Representatives for the first time since 1860.
- November 6 – The University of Adelaide is founded in Australia.
- November 7 – Harper's Weekly publishes a cartoon by Thomas Nast which is the first use of an elephant as a symbol for the Republican Party in the United States.
- November 9 – The New York Zoo hoax, a supposed breakout of animals from the Central Park Zoo, is perpetrated on the public.
- November 10 – John Ernst Worrell Keely demonstrates his "induction resonance motion motor", a perpetual motion machine, which eventually turns out to be a fraud.
- November 11 – The Gamma Phi Beta sorority is founded at Syracuse University. This is the first women's Greek letter organization to be called a sorority.
- November 16 – Premiere of Alfred Cellier's comic opera The Sultan of Mocha at the Prince's Theatre, Manchester.
- November 18 – Sailing ship Cospatrick carrying emigrants from England bound for New Zealand, catches fire and sinks in the South Atlantic with the loss of all but three of the 472 persons on board.
- November 25 – The United States Greenback Party is established as a political party, made primarily of farmers financially hurt by the Panic of 1873.

=== December ===
- December 1 – Iceland is granted a constitution and limited home rule from Denmark.
- December 9 – Passage de Vénus is released as the oldest "film" in history.
- December 29 – General Martínez and Brigadier General Luís Daban stage a pronunciamento at Sagunto, and proclaim Isabel's son Alfonso as King of Spain. Subsequently, the Madrid garrison follows suit, and the First Spanish Republic comes to an end.

=== Date unknown ===
- The Agra Canal opens in India.
- The 147-metre (482 ft)-tall spire of St. Nicholas' Church, Hamburg, designed by English architect George Gilbert Scott, is completed, making it (briefly, and by 5m) the world's tallest building (a title held since 1647 by Strasbourg Cathedral).
- The House of Keys, lower house of the Tynwald, the legislature of the Isle of Man, moves from Castletown to Douglas.
- Charles Taze Russell and the Bible Student movement claim this year marks the invisible return of Jesus Christ to earth.
- Gold is discovered in the Black Hills.
- DDT is first synthesized.
- English chemist C. R. Alder Wright synthesizes heroin for the first time.
- The following Association football clubs are founded in Great Britain:
  - Aston Villa.
  - Bolton Wanderers (as Christ Church F.C.)
  - Greenock Morton.
  - Heart of Midlothian (in Edinburgh).
- The Supreme Council 33° Ancient and Accepted Scottish Rite of Freemasonry of Canada is founded.
- The medieval Frankish Tower on the Acropolis of Athens is demolished.
- Schindler Group, known for escalators and elevators, is founded in Switzerland.

== Births ==
=== January ===
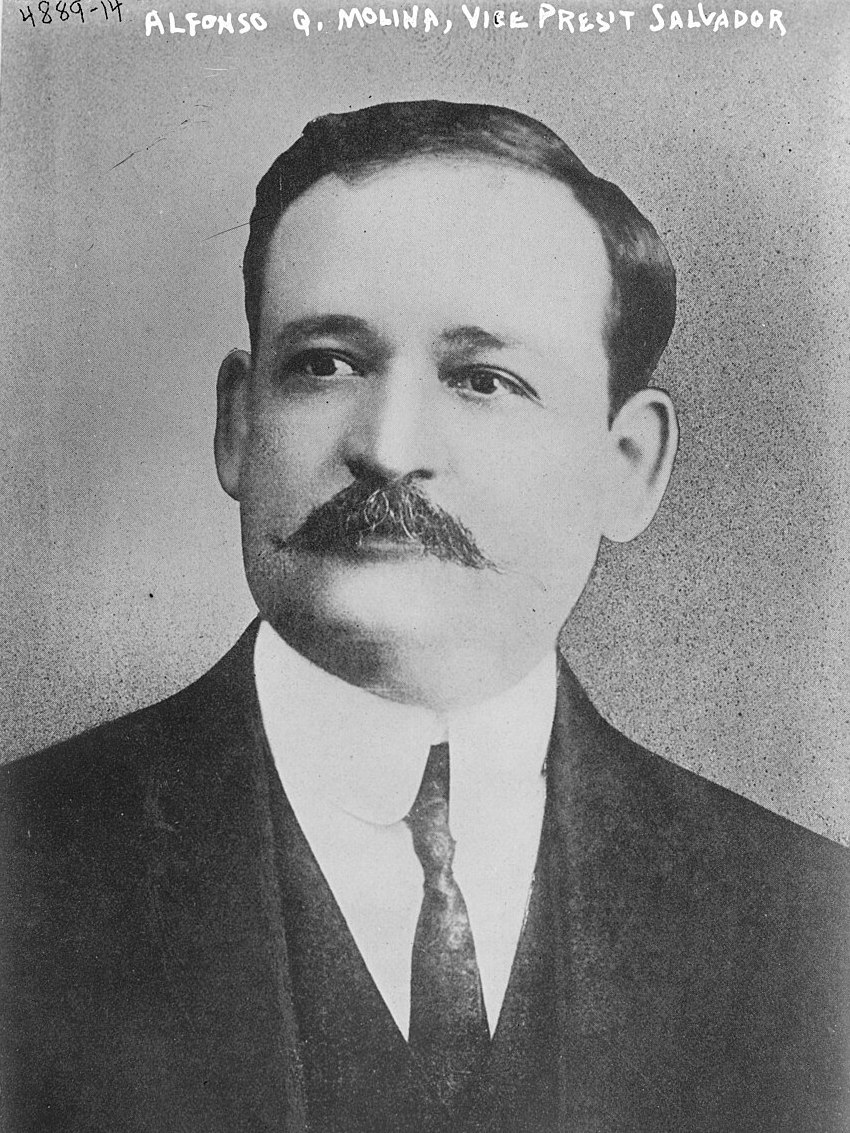
Alfonso Quiñónez Molina

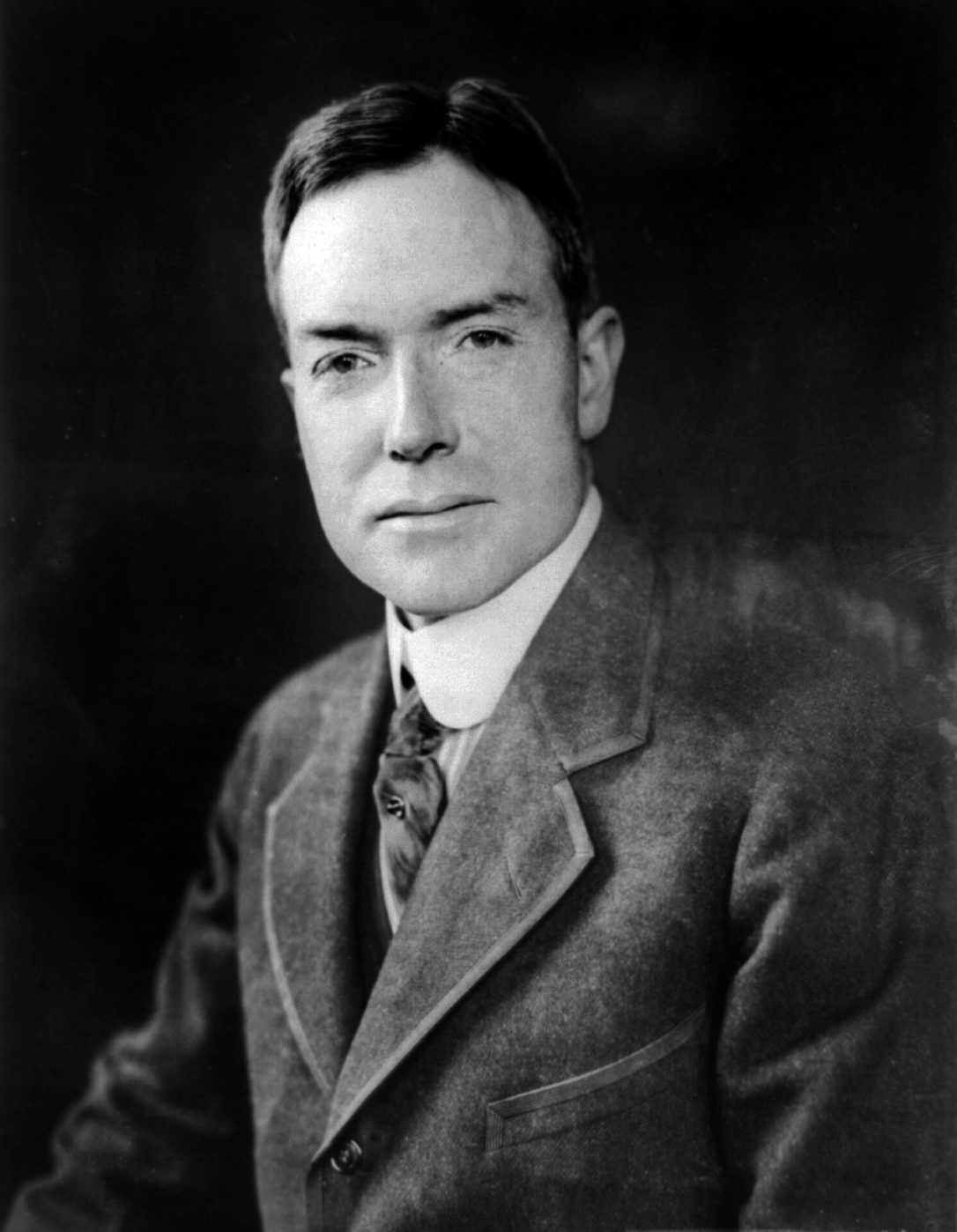
John D. Rockefeller Jr.

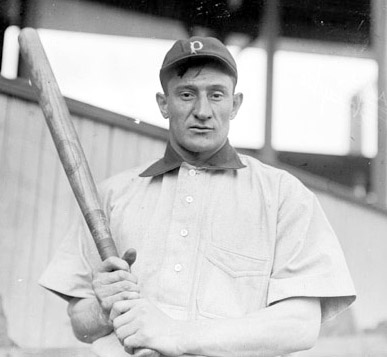
Honus Wagner

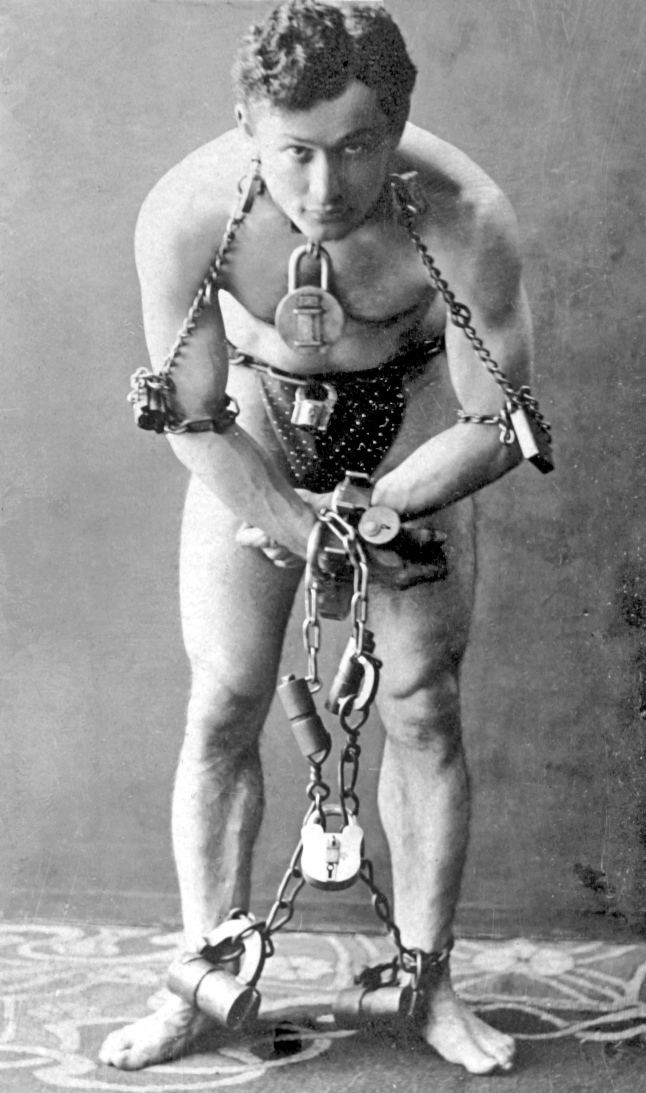
Harry Houdini

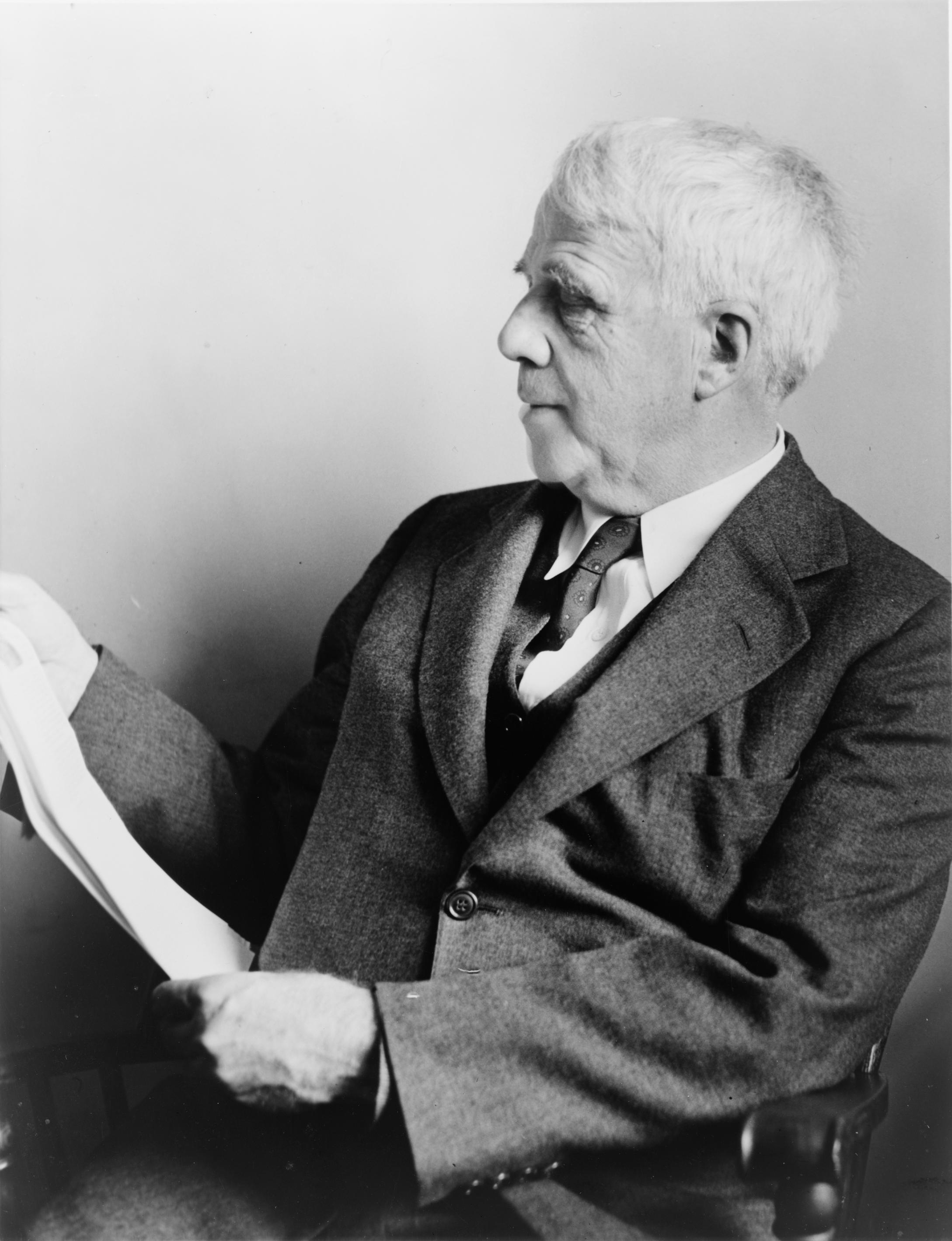
Robert Frost

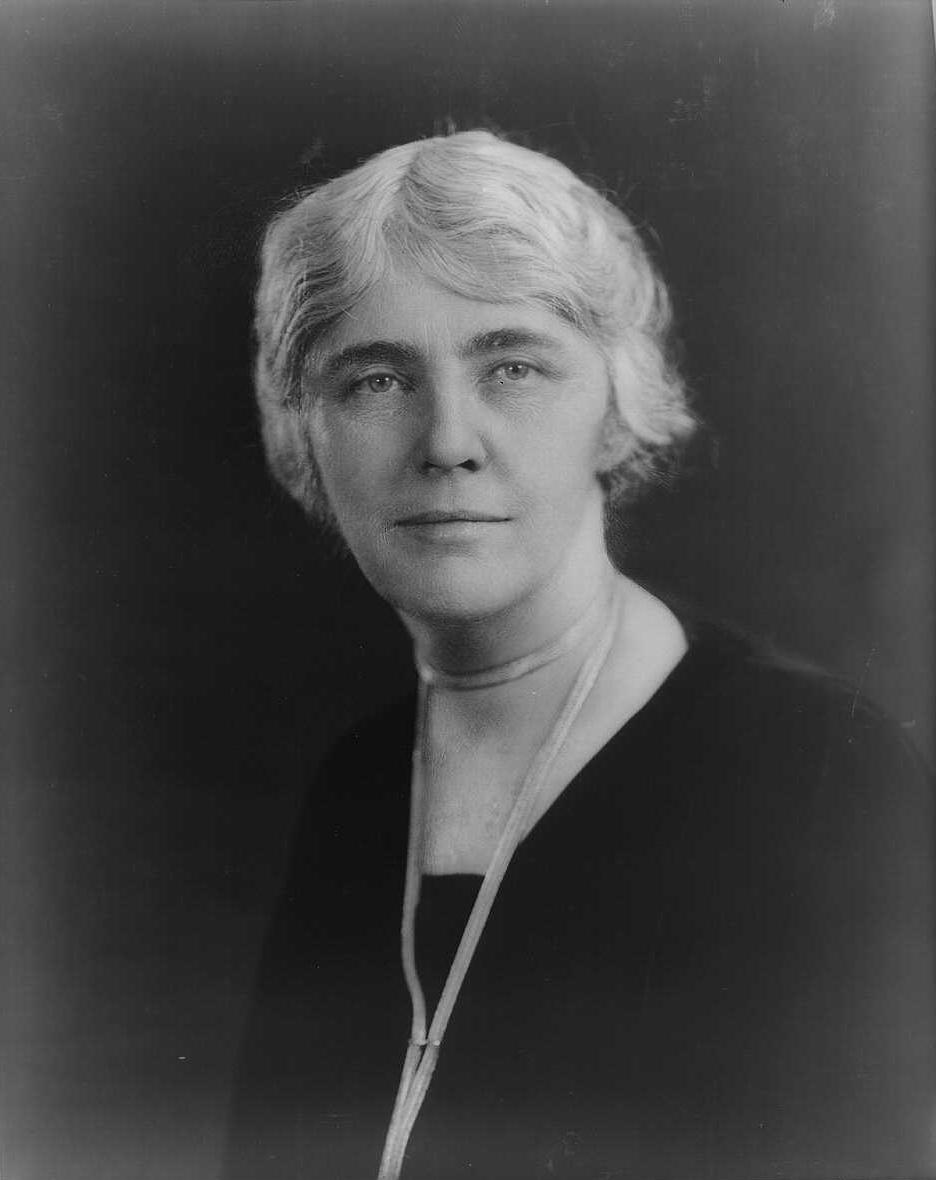
Lou Henry Hoover

- January 1
  - Alexandros Hatzikyriakos, Greek admiral, politician (d. 1958)
  - Gustave Whitehead, German-born aviation pioneer (d. 1927)
- January 4 – Josef Suk, Czech composer, violinist (d. 1935)
- January 5 – Joseph Erlanger, American physiologist, Nobel Prize laureate (d. 1965)
- January 11 – Alfonso Quiñónez Molina, Salvadoran politician, physician, and three-time president of El Salvador (d. 1950)
- January 12 – Marta Anna Wiecka, Polish Roman Catholic religious professed and blessed (d. 1904)
- January 16 – Robert W. Service, American poet (d. 1958)
- January 20 – Steve Bloomer, English footballer, cricketer and baseball player (d. 1938)
- January 21 – Frederick M. Smith, American religious leader, author (d. 1946)
- January 25 – W. Somerset Maugham, English author (d. 1965)
- January 28
  - Vsevolod Meyerhold, Russian theatre practitioner (d. 1940)
  - Gheorghe Mironescu, two-time prime minister of Romania (d. 1949)
- January 29 – John D. Rockefeller Jr., American entrepreneur (d. 1960)

=== February ===
- February 1 – Hugo von Hofmannsthal, Austrian writer (d. 1929)
- February 3 – Gertrude Stein, American writer, patron of the arts (d. 1946)
- February 6 – Henry C. Mustin, American naval aviation pioneer (d. 1923)
- February 9 – Amy Lowell, American poet (d. 1925)
- February 11
  - Elsa Beskow, Swedish writer (d. 1953)
  - Fritz Hart, English-born composer (d. 1949)
- February 15 – Sir Ernest Shackleton, Irish explorer (d. 1922)
- February 17 – Thomas J. Watson, American computer pioneer (d. 1956)
- February 19 – Carl Stockdale, American actor (d. 1953)
- February 20 – Mary Garden, American opera soprano of Scots descent (some sources state her birth year as 1877) (d. 1967)
- February 23 – Konstantin Päts, 1st President of Estonia (d. 1956)
- February 24 – Honus Wagner, American baseball player (d. 1955)
- February 26 – Nikolai Korotkov, Russian surgeon (d. 1920)
- February 28 – Pawang Nong, Pahang Hero (d. 1977)

=== March ===
- March 5 – Henry Travers, English actor (d. 1965)
- March 16 – Frédéric François-Marsal, Prime Minister of France (d. 1958)
- March 21 – Princess Beatrice of Bourbon, member of the deposed Bourbon royal family of France and Spain (b. 1874)
- March 24
  - Luigi Einaudi, 2nd president of Italy (d. 1961)
  - Harry Houdini, Hungarian-born magician (d. 1926)
- March 26 – Robert Frost, American poet (d. 1963)
- March 29
  - Lou Henry Hoover, First Lady of the United States (d. 1944)
  - Rudolf Maister, Slovene military officer, leader of "Maister's Fighters" (d. 1934)
- March 30
  - Charles Herbert Lightoller, 2nd Officer of the RMS Titanic (d. 1952)
  - Nicolae Rădescu, 45th prime minister of Romania (d. 1953)

=== April ===
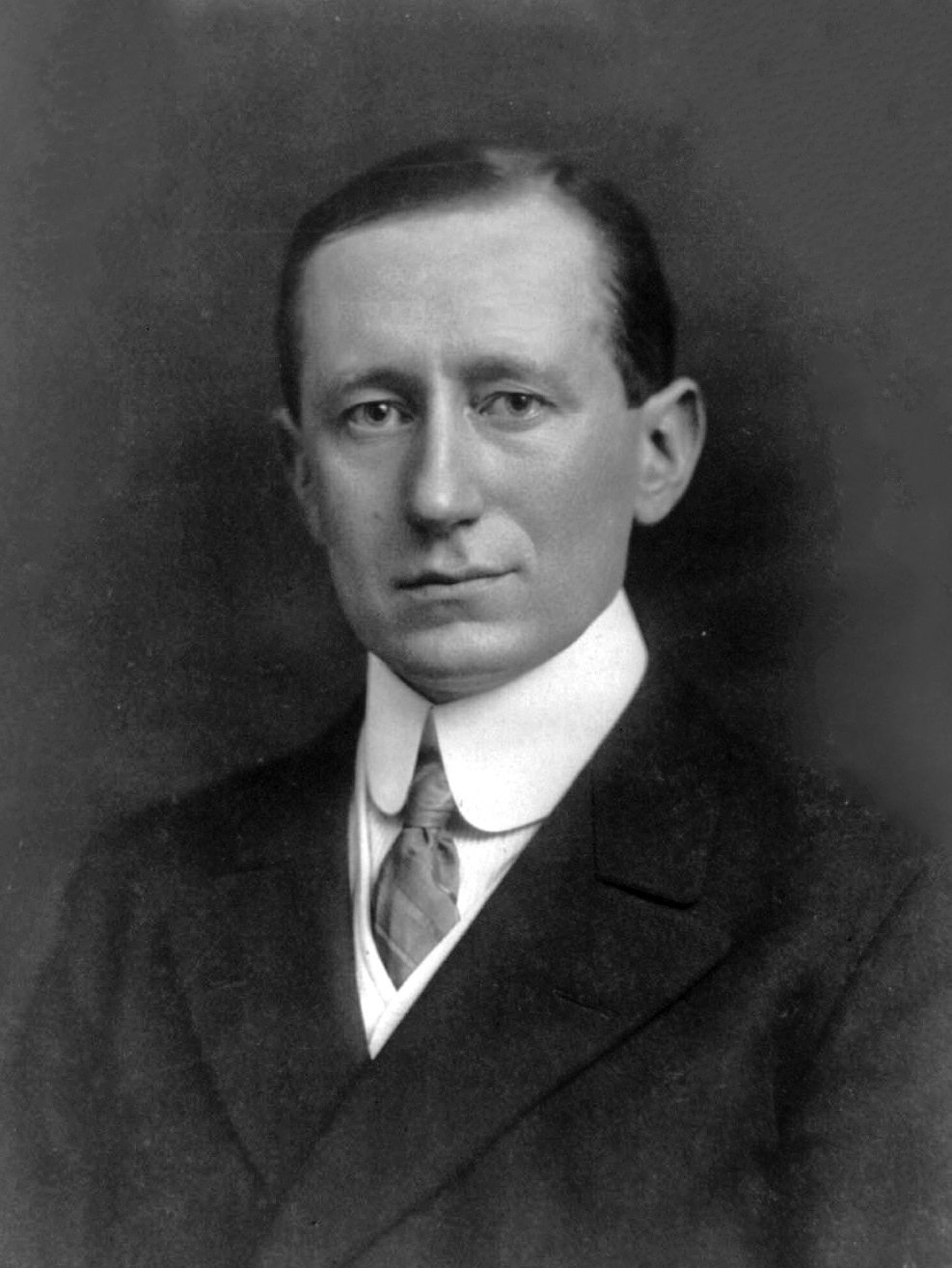
Guglielmo Marconi

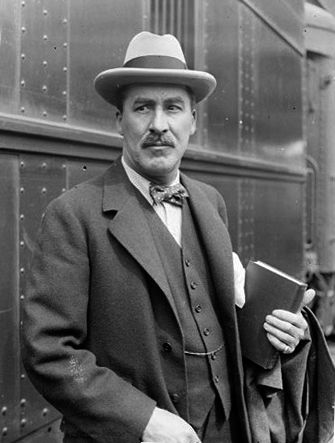
Howard Carter

- April 1 – Emmi Mäkelin, Finnish midwife and politician (d. 1962)
- April 8 – Stanisław Taczak, Polish general, commander-in-chief of the Greater Poland Uprising (d. 1960)
- April 14 – Matti Lonkainen, Finnish politician (d. 1918)
- April 15 – Johannes Stark, German physicist, Nobel Prize laureate (d. 1957)
- April 19 – Ernst Rüdin, Swiss psychiatrist, geneticist (d. 1952)
- April 25 – Guglielmo Marconi, Italian inventor, recipient of the Nobel Prize in Physics (d. 1937)
- April 28 – Sidney Toler, American actor, playwright and theatre director (d. 1947)

=== May ===
- May 3 – François Coty, French perfume manufacturer (d. 1934)
- May 9 – Howard Carter, British archaeologist (d. 1939)
- May 14 – Polaire, French actress, singer (d. 1939)
- May 17 – Mikhail Diterikhs, Russian general (d. 1937)
- May 19 – Gilbert Jessop, English cricketer (d. 1955)
- May 22 – D. F. Malan, 4th prime minister of South Africa (d. 1959)
- May 26 – Henri Farman, French pilot and aircraft designer (d. 1958)
- May 27 – Dustin Farnum, American actor (d. 1929)
- May 29 – G. K. Chesterton, English author (d. 1936)

=== June ===
- June 11 – Lyman Gilmore, American aviation pioneer (d. 1951)
- June 14 – Louis Lipsett, Irish-born British general (d. 1918)
- June 16 – Arthur Meighen, 9th Prime Minister of Canada (d. 1960)
- June 17 – Grant Mitchell, American actor (d. 1957)
- June 18 – King George Tupou II of Tonga (d. 1918)

=== July ===
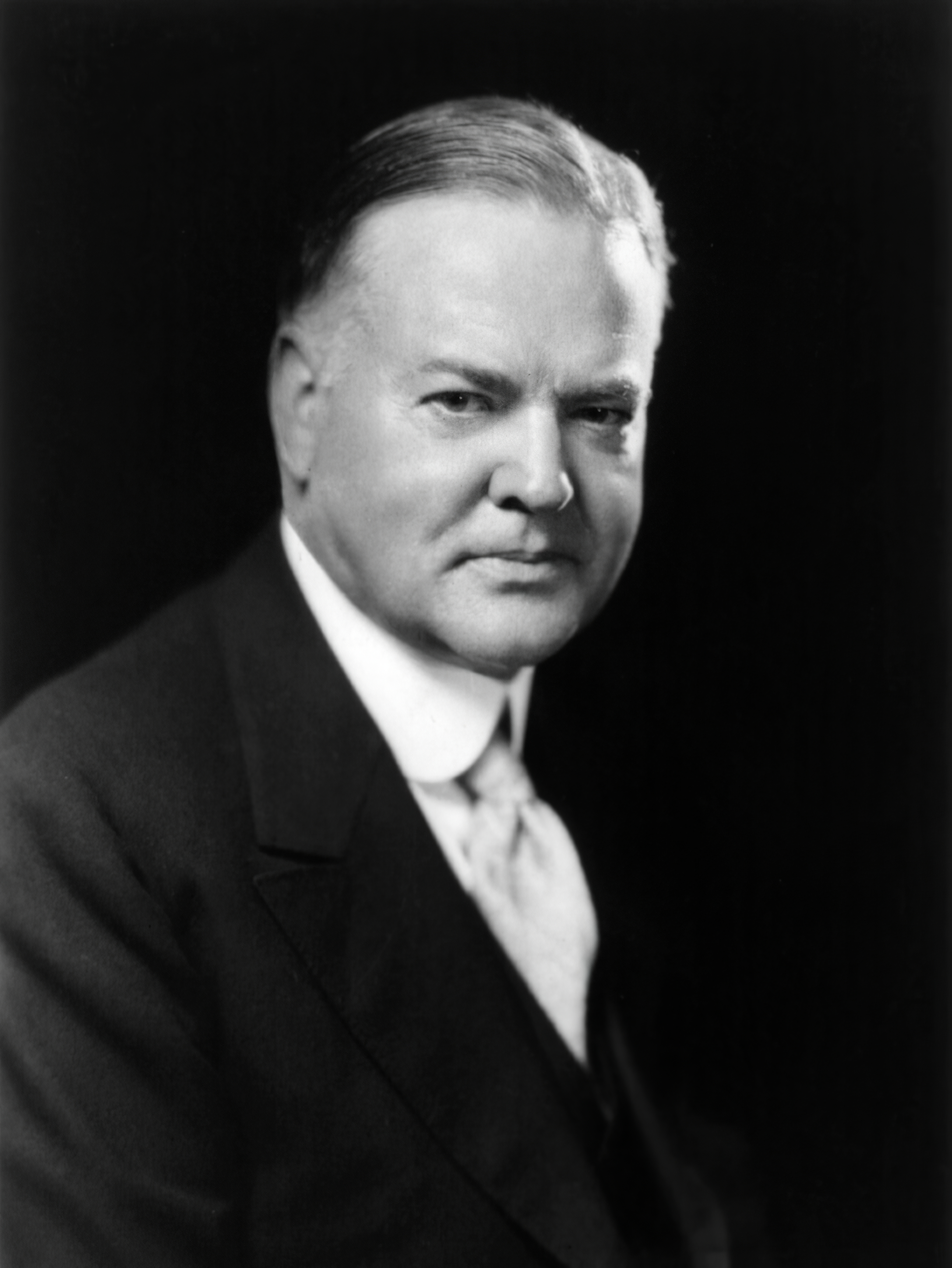
Herbert Hoover

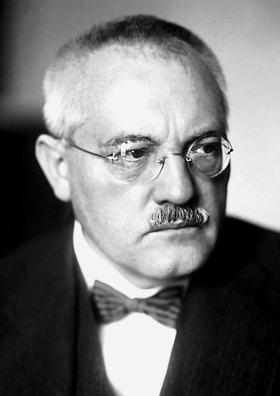
Carl Bosch

- July 3 – R. B. Bennett, 11th Prime Minister of Canada (d. 1947)
- July 5 – Eugen Fischer, German professor of medicine, anthropology, and eugenics (d. 1967)
- July 6 – Isaías de Noronha, 13th President of Brazil (d. 1963)
- July 14 – Abbas II, last khedive of Egypt (d. 1944)
- July 25 – Alfred Walton Hinds, 17th Naval Governor of Guam (d. 1957)
- July 26 – Serge Koussevitzky, Russian conductor (d. 1951)
- July 27 – Frank Shannon, Irish-born American actor (d. 1959)
- July 29 – J. S. Woodsworth, Canadian politician (d. 1942)

=== August ===
- August 1 – Constantin Levaditi, Romanian physician and microbiologist (d. 1953)
- August 6 – Charles Fort, Dutch-American writer, researcher into anomalous phenomena (d. 1932)
- August 8 – Albert Stanley, 1st Baron Ashfield, British-American businessman (d. 1948)
- August 10
  - Herbert Hoover, 31st President of the United States (d. 1964)
  - Jirō Minami, Japanese general, Governor-General of Korea (1936–1942) (d. 1955)
  - Tod Sloan, American jockey (d. 1933)
- August 14 – Bertha M. Wilson, American dramatist, critic, and actress (d. 1936)
- August 27 – Carl Bosch, German chemist, Nobel Prize laureate (d. 1940)

=== September ===
- September 12 – Redcliffe N. Salaman, British botanist (d. 1955)
- September 13
  - Henry F. Ashurst, American politician (d. 1962)
  - Arnold Schoenberg, Austrian composer (d. 1951)
- September 20 – Barbara Schack, Sudeten German politician (d. 1958)
- September 21 – Gustav Holst, English composer (d. 1934)
- September 23 – Ernst Streeruwitz, 6th Chancellor of Austria (d. 1952)

=== October ===
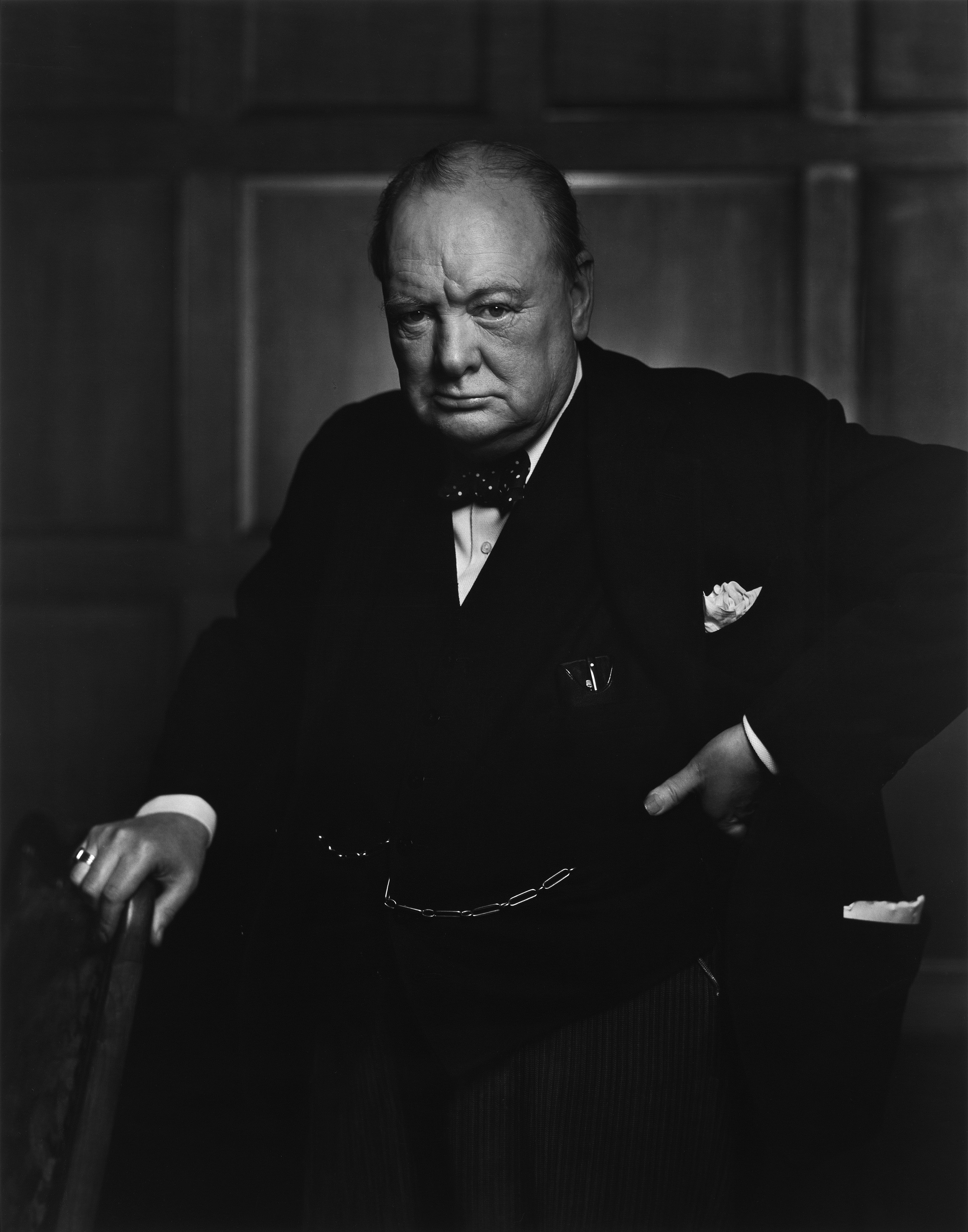
Winston Churchill

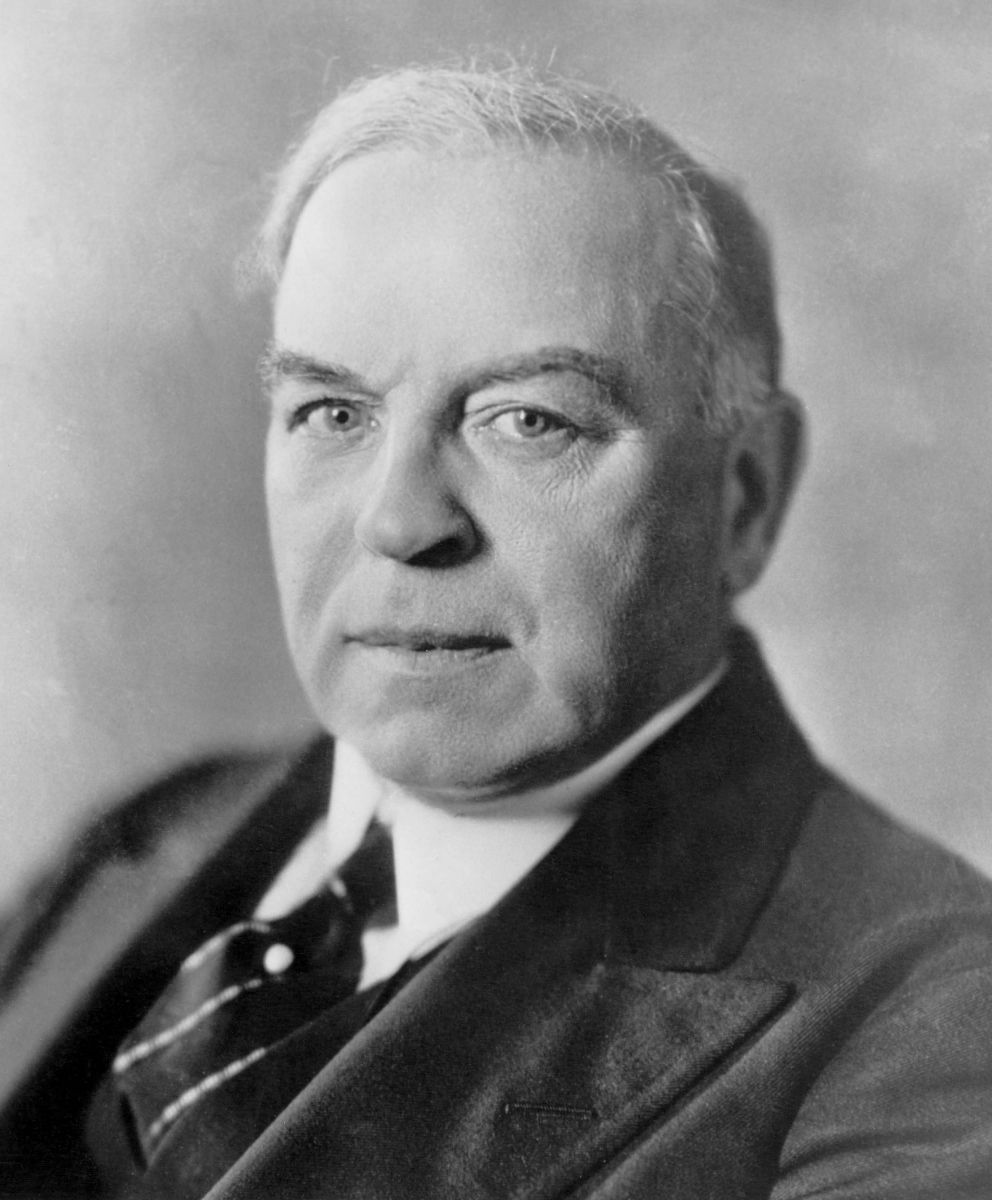
William Lyon Mackenzie King

- October 3 – Charles Middleton, American actor (d. 1949)
- October 8
  - István Bethlen, 28th prime minister of Hungary (d. 1946)
  - Nance O'Neil, American stage and film actress (d. 1965)
- October 9 – Nicholas Roerich, Russian painter (d. 1947)
- October 13 – József Klekl, Slovene politician in Hungary (d. 1948)
- October 15 – Alfred, Hereditary Prince of Saxe-Coburg and Gotha (d. 1899)
- October 17 – Lumsden Hare, Irish-born actor, theatre director and producer (d. 1964)
- October 20 – Charles Ives, American composer (d. 1954)
- October 26 – Martin Lowry, English chemist (d. 1936)

=== November ===
- November 1 – Salima Machamba, Sultan of Mohéli (d. 1964)
- November 13 – Henry Kolker, American stage, screen actor (d. 1947)
- November 14 – Johann Schober, 3rd Chancellor of Austria (d. 1932)
- November 15 – August Krogh, Danish zoophysiologist, recipient of the Nobel Prize in Physiology or Medicine (d. 1949)
- November 22 – Elizabeth Patterson, actress (d. 1966)
- November 27 – Chaim Weizmann, 1st president of Israel (d. 1952)
- November 29 – António Egas Moniz, Portuguese physician and neurologist, recipient of the Nobel Prize in Physiology or Medicine (d. 1955)
- November 30
  - Winston Churchill, Prime Minister of the United Kingdom, recipient of the Nobel Prize in Literature (d. 1965)
  - Friedrich Hasenöhrl, Austrian physicist (d. 1915)
  - Lucy Maud Montgomery, Canadian author (d. 1942)

=== December ===
- December 2 – Eleanor Addison Phillips, English educator and founder of the world's first Soroptimist Movement, the Venture Club (d. 1952)
- December 11
  - James L. Kraft, Canadian-American entrepreneur, inventor (d. 1953)
  - Paul Wegener, German actor, film director, and screenwriter; one of the pioneers of German Expressionism (d. 1948)
- December 13 – Josef Lhévinne, Russian pianist (d. 1944)
- December 17 – William Lyon Mackenzie King, 10th Prime Minister of Canada (d. 1950)
- December 22 – Franz Schmidt, Austrian composer (d. 1939)
- December 26 – Khan Bahadur Ahsanullah, Indian educationist, philosopher, philanthropist, social reformer, Sufi thinker, scientist and spiritual person (d. 1965)
- December 29 – Thomas W. Benoist, American aviator, aircraft designer and manufacturer, founder of the world's first scheduled airline (d. 1917)

== Deaths ==
=== January–June ===
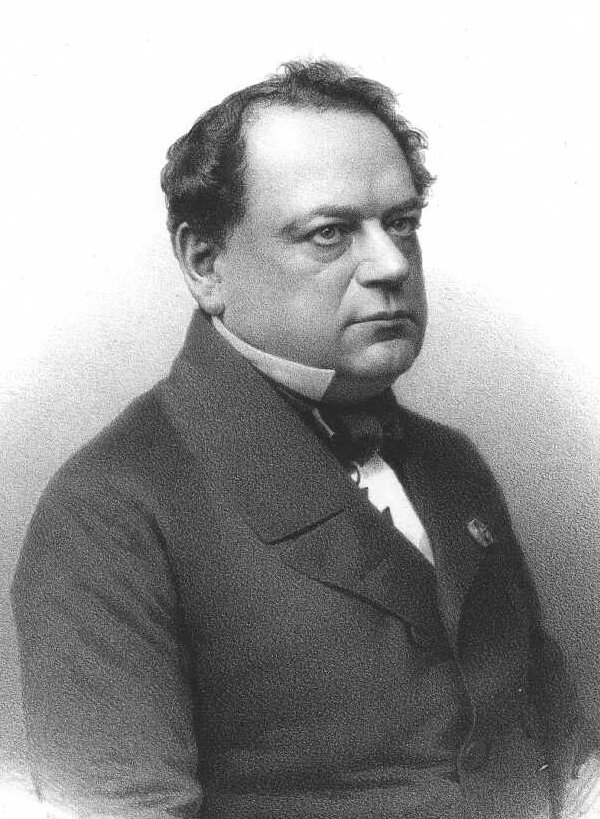
Moritz von Jacobi

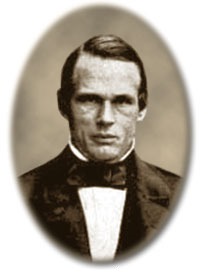
Anders Jonas Ångström

- January 8 – Abbé Charles Étienne Brasseur de Bourbourg, French writer, historian (b. 1814)
- January 14 – Johann Philipp Reis, German scientist, inventor (b. 1834)
- January 17 – Chang and Eng Bunker, Siamese twins, sideshow performers (b. 1811)
- January 19 – August Heinrich Hoffmann von Fallersleben, German poet (b. 1798)
- January 28 – Ludwig von Gablenz, Austrian general (suicide) (b. 1814)
- February 3 – William Charles Lunalilo, last monarch of the House of Kamehameha (b. 1835)
- February 8 – David Friedrich Strauss, German theologian (b. 1808)
- February 24 – John Bachman, American Lutheran minister, social activist and naturalist (b. 1790)
- February 27 – Carlos Manuel de Céspedes, Cuban revolutionary hero (b. 1819)
- March 8 – Millard Fillmore, 13th President of the United States (b. 1800)
- March 10 – Moritz von Jacobi, German engineer, physicist (b. 1801)
- March 11 – Charles Sumner, American senator, civil rights activist (b. 1811)
- March 20 – Hans Christian Lumbye, Danish composer (b. 1810)
- March 30 – Carl Julian (von) Graba, German lawyer and ornithologist who visited the Faroe Islands (b. 1799)
- April 13 – Etō Shimpei, Japanese statesman (executed) (b. 1834)
- April 20 – Alexander H. Bailey, American politician (b. 1807)
- May 15 – Robert Goodenow, American politician and former member of the United States House of Representatives (b. 1800)
- June 17 – Sir Stephen Glynne, British antiquary and politician (b. 1817)
- June 20 – John Ruggles, American politician (b. 1789)
- June 21 – Anders Jonas Ångström, Swedish physicist (b. 1814)
- June 23 – Cosme García Sáez, Spanish inventor (b. 1818)

=== July–December ===
- July 8 – Agnes Strickland, English popular historian (b. 1796)
- July 12 – Fritz Reuter, German novelist (b. 1810)
- July 24 – Gijsbert Haan, Dutch-American religious leader (b. 1801)
- August 14 – Jonathan Clarkson Gibbs, African-American minister, politician (b. 1821)
- August 26 – Julie-Victoire Daubié, French journalist (b. 1824)
- August 27 – Ștefan Golescu, 8th prime minister of Romania (b. 1809)
- September 12 – François Guizot, Prime Minister of France (b. 1787)
- October 5 – Charles-Mathias Simons, Prime Minister of Luxembourg (b. 1802)
- October 6 – Samuel M. Kier, American oil magnate (b. 1813)
- October 23 – Abraham Geiger, German rabbi, a founder of European Reform Judaism (b. 1810)
- October 28 – William Henry Rinehart, American sculptor (b. 1825)
- November 17 – Francisco de Lersundi y Hormaechea, Spanish noble and politician, Prime Minister of Spain (b. 1817)
- November 18 – Sir Henry Prescott, British admiral and colonial administrator (b. 1783)
- November 29 – Ioan Manu, Russian politician (b. 1803)
- December 6 – John Boyle, British politician (b. 1803)
- December 7 – Constantin von Tischendorf, German Biblical scholar (b. 1815)
- December 22 – Johann Peter Pixis, German pianist, composer (b. 1788)
- December 24 – Anna McClarmonde Chase, American spy (b. 1809)
