= Kacgae =

Coordinates: 22°51′26″S 22°12′27″E

Location of Kacgae

Kacgae is a village in Ghanzi District of Botswana. It is located in the southern part of the district, and it has a primary school. The population was 282 in 2001 census.
