= Bouwer =

Bouwer or Bouwers is a surname. Notable people with the surname include:

- Alba Bouwer (1920–2010), South African Afrikaans-writing journalist and author
- Albert Bouwers (1893–1972), Dutch optical engineer
- Ben Bouwer (Barend Daniël Bouwer, 1875–1938), Boer War general, police officer and colonel in South Africa
- Marc Bouwer, South African-born American fashion designer
