= Qabo =

Village in Ghanzi District, Botswana

Coordinates: 21°3′36″S 21°43′43″E

Location of Qabo

Qabo is a village in Ghanzi District of Botswana. It is located in the north-eastern part of the district, north of the district capital Ghanzi, and it has a primary school. The population was 401 in 2001 census.
