= Far Barcelona =

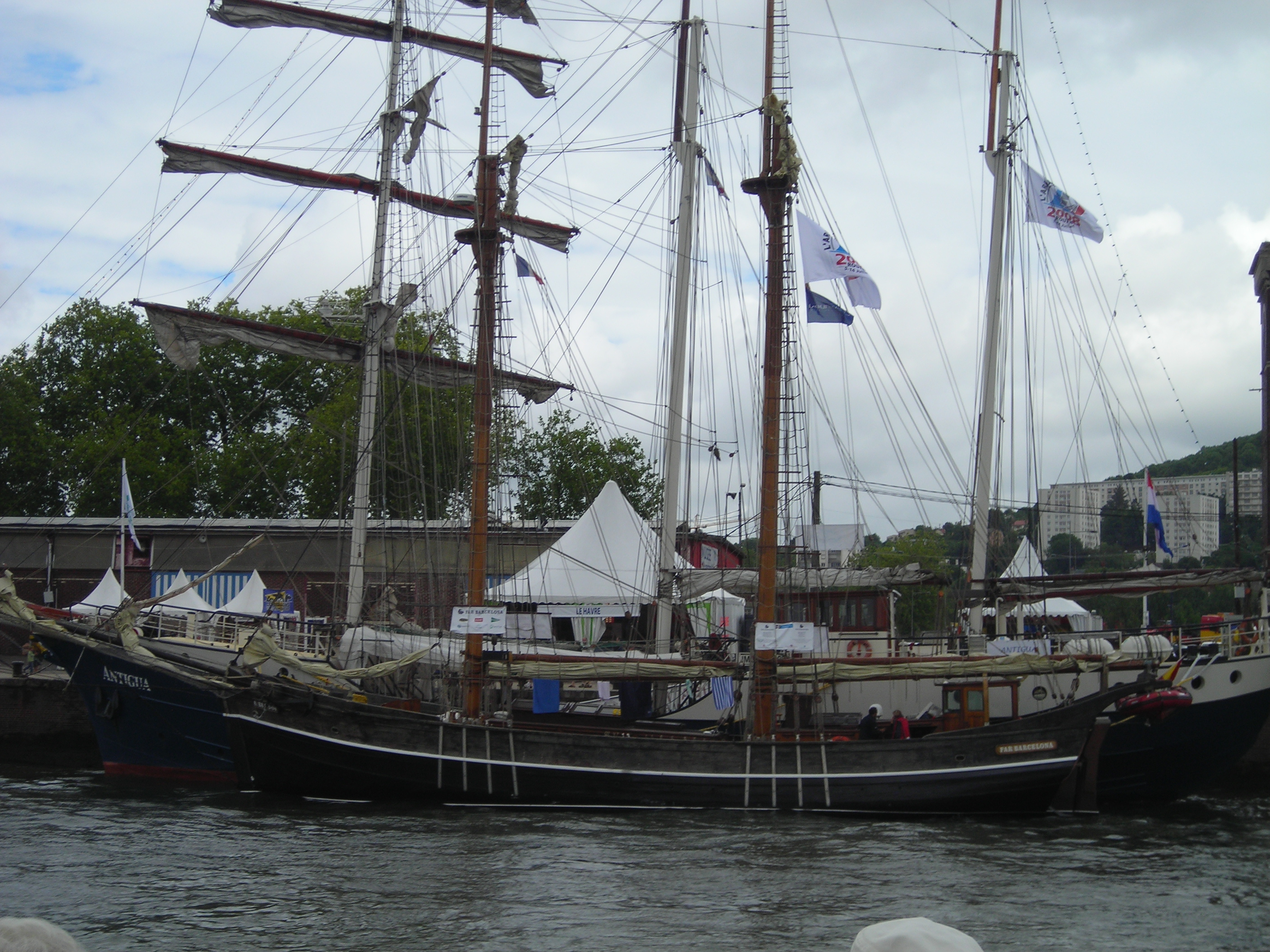
- In the foreground, Far Barcelona in Rouen during Armada 2008

History
- Name: Far Barcelona; Anne Dorthea
- Owner: Consorci El Far
- Launched: 1874

General characteristics
- Length: 30.85 m (101.2 ft)
- Beam: 6.76 m (22.2 ft)
- Draft: 2.9 m (9 ft 6 in)
- Sail plan: Schooner straight
- Complement: 10 crew members + 18 cadets

Far Barcelona is a two-masted schooner, of Norwegian origin, rigged with a gaff sail (asymmetric trapezoidal sail), built in the community of Kvinherred, Norway, in 1874.

It now serves as a training ship and is also an ambassador for the city of Barcelona. It obtains its energy through solar energy and wind energy.

== Description ==
It is a schooner of Norwegian origin that was used for fishing, whaling, cabotage maritime transport and the transport of immigrants with the name Anne Dorthea. It has dimensions of 23 m in length, and with the bowsprit of 33 m in maximum length, 6.76 m in beam and a displacement of 140 tons. It has recently been incorporated into the fleet of the Barcelona Maritime Museum.

== History ==
It was initially owned by two partners from Haugesund, and named Anne Dorthea in honor of the wife of one of them. At first it was basically dedicated to trade and transportation through the North Sea and Baltic Sea, especially salted herring and general cargo. Occasionally, he dedicated himself to transporting emigrants to North America. In the second half of the twentieth century, a 100 HP diesel engine was added and during the 1970s it was removed from service for restoration work carried out in Forlandsvaag Bay. In 1984 the ship was acquired by Miquel Borillo Esteve, who dedicated himself to rehabilitating it, first in the port of Vinaròs and in 1990 in the port of Barcelona, with the help of the association "Barcelona, fes-te a la mar" and, later, by the "Consorci el Far". Groups with social and labor exclusion problems participated in its restoration. It was adapted and transformed into a training ship, intended for teaching traditional navigation and open school social rehabilitation. In July 2006, the schooner was renamed Far Barcelona in a ceremony officiated by Joan Clos, then mayor of Barcelona, and that same summer, she participated in two legs of the Tall Ships' Races regatta.

Due to the dissolution of the Consorci El Far, the vessel became part of the boat collection of the Barcelona Maritime Museum in September 2016.

== Bibliography ==
- Blanch, Agustí; Domènech, Joan; Zucchitello, Mario (2010). Barcelona i la vela tradicional: L'Escola de Navegació Tradicional, les seves embarcacions i les seves rutes [Barcelona and traditional sailing: The Traditional Sailing School, its boats and its routes]. Barcelona: Consorci El Far : Triangle postals.
- La Ruta dels consolats de mar: una segona aventura per la Mediterrània. Lloret de Mar: Club Marina Casinet. 2012.
