= GNZ =

GNZ may refer to:

- Ganzi language
- Ghanzi Airport, in Botswana
- Gliding New Zealand
