= Chobokwane =

Village in Botswana

Coordinates: 22°9′17″S 21°12′50″E

Location of Chobokwane

Chobokwane is a village in Ghanzi District of Botswana. It is located south-west of the district capital Ghanzi, and has a primary school. The population was 771 in 2011 census.
