= East Hanahai =

Village in Botswana

Coordinates: 22°9′27″S 21°53′22″E

Location of East Hanahai

A typical house in East Hanahai

East Hanahai is a village in Ghanzi District of Botswana. It is located in the central part of the district, close to the Central Kalahari Game Reserve, roughly 50 km south-east of Ghanzi. East Hanahai has a primary school and a health clinic. The building of the Trans-Kalahari Highway along its new route, rather than using the path of the old Gaborone - Ghanzi road has had a negative effect on East and West Hanahai due to the dramatic reduction in through traffic. The lack of jobs means that many members of the community rely on irregular government piece jobs (known as drought relief) and/or government food baskets. The population was 532 in 2011 census and is made up of a mixture of Basarwa (Bushmen) and Batswana.
