= Pawang Nong =

Pawang Nong (1874–1977) or his real name is Haji Nong Taib Bin Santan was once the Royal Pawang of Pahang. He is also a follower and is said to have been associated with the famous warrior hero Mat Kilau who fought against the occupants once near Kampung Hulu Cheka at Ulu Cheka, Jerantut, Pahang.

Pawang Nong

== Biography ==
He was born in Kampung Sempiat, Benta, Mukim Tanjung Besar, Lipis in 1874 and died on November 10, 1977, in Kampung Ulu Cheka. His tomb can be visited at the grounds of Kampung Ulu Cheka mosque, Jerantut, Pahang. He has two wives and is blessed with 11 children as a result of his marriage, the first wife named Patam Mat Sama having 8 children (4 men and 4 women) and the second wife named Hajah Halimat Binti Mak Long and 3 children (1 male and 2 female).

== Services ==
A primary school in Kampung Ulu Cheka, Pawang Nong National School, was named after him in honor of his service. He was the founder or founder of Kampung Ulu Cheka with 7 of his friends on July 7, 1907. He was appointed head of the village until 1966. In addition he was the founder of the Kampung Ulu Cheka mosque and was the Pawang of the village and also a Royal Pawang.

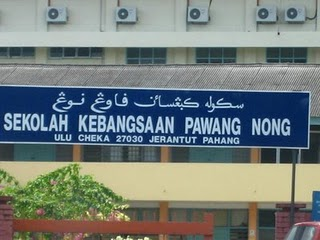
Pawang Nong established as Sekolah Kebangsaan Pawang Nong, at C141, 27030 Damak, Pahang

He is also the founder of the martial art medium in Kampung Ulu Cheka and the Warrior Melayu Pahang against the occupation communist military and Japan in the area ini. He meeting among locals call it the title Aki We or Ancestor We.

His brother, Abu bin Santan, known as Bilal Abu also opened Ulu Cheka with him, and he was adopted in Ulu Cheka.
