= West Hanahai =

Village in Botswana

Coordinates: 22°6′9″S 21°46′21″E

Location of West Hanahai

West Hanahai is a village in Ghanzi District of Botswana. It is located in the central part of the district, close to the Central Kalahari Game Reserve roughly 50 km south west of Ghanzi. The building of the Trans-Kalahari Highway along its new route, rather than using the path of the old Gaborone - Ghanzi road has had a negative effect on West and East Hanahai due to the dramatic reduction in through traffic. The lack of jobs means that many members of the community rely on irregular government piece jobs (known as drought relief) and/or government food baskets. West Hanahai has a primary school and a health clinic. The population was 560 in 2001 census.
