= Ghanzi Airport =

Airport in Ghanzi, Botswana

- IATA: GNZ; ICAO: FBGZ

Summary
- Airport type: Public
- Serves: Ghanzi
- Elevation AMSL: 3,729 ft (1,137 m)
- Coordinates: 21°41′40″S 21°39′20″E

Map
- Location of the airport in Botswana

Runways
| Direction | Length | | Surface |
| Direction | m | ft | Surface |
|---|---|---|---|
| 06/24 | 1,500 | 4,921 | Asphalt |

Ghanzi Airport (IATA: GNZ, ICAO: FBGZ) is a port of entry airport serving Ghanzi, a town in the Ghanzi District of Botswana. Although it is a relatively small facility today, the airport historically provided vital transportation for local residents. In 1935, Ghanzi was selected as a key stop on a proposed regional air circuit, though early service agreements quickly collapsed. Over the years, several proposals have been made to relocate the airport. Currently, its single runway is designed to handle light aircraft, government agency flights, and occasional international traffic.

== History ==
In June 1935, Ghanzi was included as a key western stop on a proposed fortnightly air circuit operated by Rhodesian and Nyasaland Airways Limited (RANA). To support this network, the airstrip was selected as one of five locations in the Bechuanaland Protectorate to receive wireless telephony facilities for flight coordination. When the RANA deal collapsed due to funding shortages, South African Defence Minister Oswald Pirow agreed in late 1936 to reroute a planned Union service to Windhoek through Ghanzi to transport mail and officials. However, Pirow soon cut the service and removed Ghanzi from the route, prompting the local District Commissioner to complain that aircraft had ceased landing entirely. Despite these disruptions, formal colonial air mail projections in February 1937 estimated that the western route serving Ghanzi, Maun, and Lehututu would handle 5,000 to 8,000 pounds of mail annually.

Historically, many Ghanzi residents relied on the airport for transport to services outside of the town. A 1974 historical account from The New York Times noted that the Ghanzi airstrip was actively handling scheduled weekly commercial bank flights and global research expeditions.

=== Attempts at relocation ===
Detailed project designs to relocate the airport near the Ghanzi hospital were completed in December 2009 under National Development Plan 10. However, that specific site was abandoned due to hospital noise and environmental concerns, and the overall project was frozen indefinitely when a global economic recession forced a government moratorium on new infrastructure.

In 2019, Assistant Minister Botlogile Tshireletso confirmed to the Ntlo ya Dikgosi (House of Chiefs) that a new location has been selected and started undergoing a mandatory Environmental Impact Assessment.

As of 2026, the Civil Aviation Authority of Botswana's website entry for the Ghanzi Airport states that "[t]here are currently no ongoing projects."

== Operations ==
Ghanzi Airport is a small, low-traffic facility accounting for roughly 0.1% of all aircraft movement in Botswana which mainly serves light, private planes, along with government agencies. however the airport holds a special official status allowing international flights; most of which are South African farmers who own farms in Ghanzi. Because of this, there is no scheduled service, only charter and private operations. The airport is about 1 kilometre (0.62 mi) from Ghanzi.

== Facilities ==
The airport has a single asphalt runway designated 06/24 which measures 1,500 metres (4,900 ft) long and 18 metres (59 ft) wide. It is designed to handle light aircraft with a Maximum All Up Weight (MAUW) of 5,700 kilograms (12,600 lb).

== See also ==
- Transport in Botswana
- List of airports in Botswana

== Bibliography ==
- Bayani, Simon Isaac (2017). Civil Aviation and Scheduled Air Services in Colonial Botswana, 1935-1966: A History of Underdevelopment (Thesis). Peterborough, Ontario: Trent University. OCLC 1320426847.
