= Hendrik van Zyl =

- Born: Hendrik Matthys van Zyl; 19 October 1828
- Died: June 1880 (aged 51)
- Occupation: Politician

Hendrik Matthys van Zyl (van Zijl), the "Laird of Ghanzi" (19 October 1828 – June 1880) was the first Afrikaner settler in Ghanzi, Botswana.

A former politician in Transvaal, he crossed the Kalahari several times and set up a small trading enterprise in Ghanzi, where was known for his flamboyant character and extravagant wealth. He gained a reputation for ruthlessness in his business dealings, and even initially refused water to the Dorsland Trekkers on their way to Angola in 1875. He shot over 400 elephants, and the ivory from the beasts amounted to over 4 tonnes. With a vast ivory fortune, van Zyl built a two-story mansion with stained glass windows and imported furniture from France, the ruins of which still stand today. His hunting prowess was so well known and remarkable in the region, it was recorded in one single day van Zyl and his sons slaughtered 103 elephants. It is alleged that in the Gcwihaba cave, in northwest Botswana, van Zyl stashed a great fortune in the late 19th century. To this day, he is a legendary regional figure, and many tales have been written about him.
