= Karakobis =

Village in Botswana

Coordinates: 22°05′44″S 20°37′04″E

Location of Karakobis

Karakobis (also spelt Karakubis) is a small village in Ghanzi District of Botswana. It is located close to the Namibian border. The population was 785 according to the 2001 census. The residents of Karakobis belong to a number of different indigenous tribes, some of which originated from South Africa and Namibia. These include the Barolong, Basarwa, Baherero, Bakgalagadi, Batlharo. Karakobis has little development beyond those to support basic government services. There is a kgotla, a VDC pre-school, a government primary school, government social welfare offices, government medical clinic and a government agriculture office. People in Karakobis survive mainly from subsistence and small-scale farming. The "lands" (farms) and cattle posts are within walking distance of the village.

Karakobis has the unique characteristic of being an antipode to Kapaa, Hawaii.
