= Kambazembi =

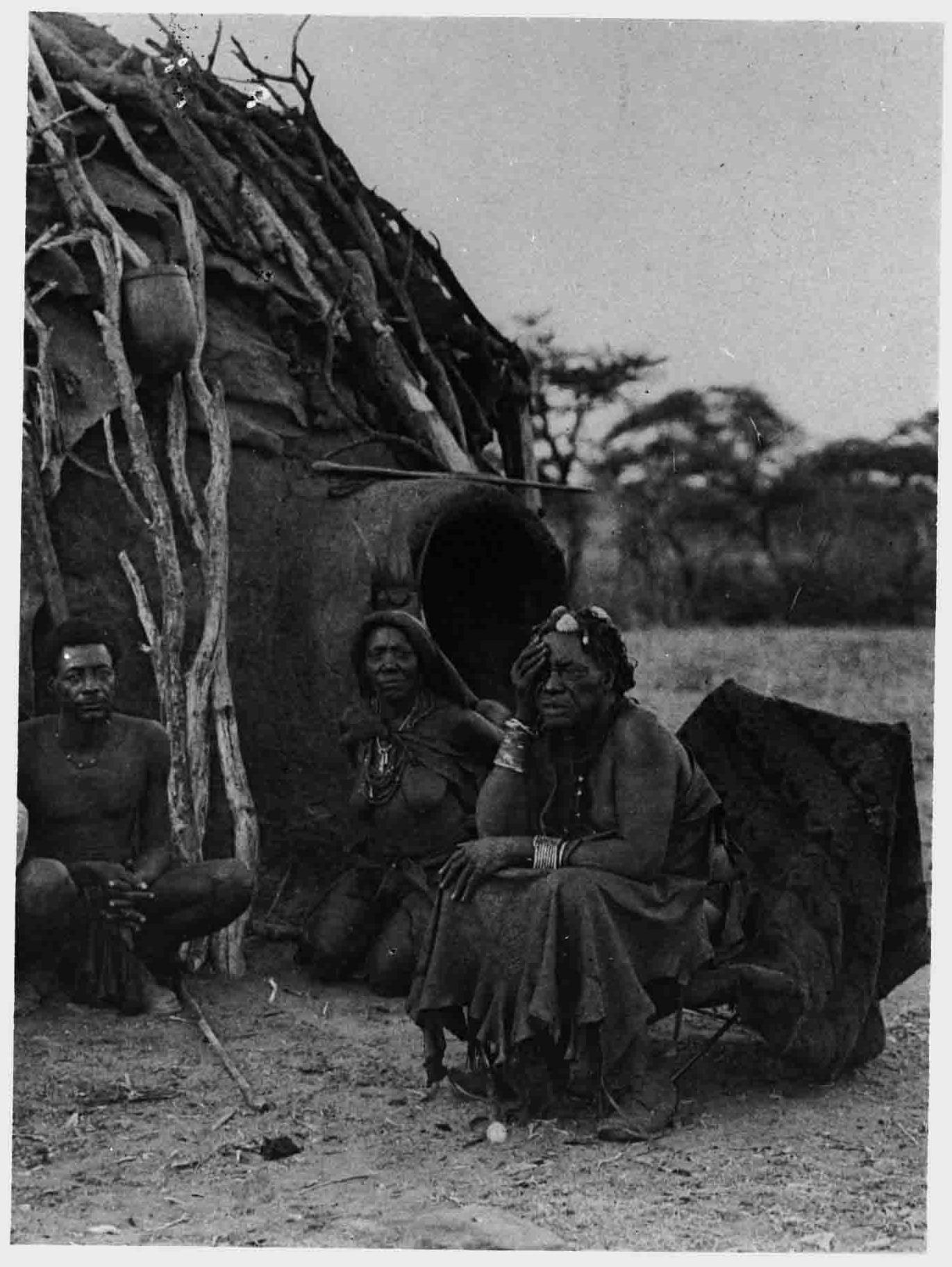
Kambazembi from Waterberg

Kambazembi wa Kangombe (Kambazembi, son of Kangombe) (c. 1843–1903) was a chief of the Herero people in South-West Africa, today Namibia. He was the leader of the clan that lived around the Waterberg.

Kambazembi was a cousin of Maharero. He took over the chieftainship from his father Kangombe in 1860 and reigned until his death. He was known to be friendly with all people, including Whites. He however was in fierce opposition to selling land to an encroaching wave of white settlers (probably early participants of the Dorsland Trek), and to German colonial occupation. He also took pride in conserving Herero culture, leading the life of a nomad and continuing to wear hides instead of the Victorian dress code introduced by the missionaries. When he died in September 1903, his sons divided the clan area. David Kaonjonga Kambazembi became chief of the Waterberg, and Salatiel Kambazembi took over the rest of the land.
