= Dorsland tree =

Baobab Tree in Namibia on the route of the Dorsland Trek

The Dorsland tree, also known as the Dorsland Baobab and the Dorsland Grootboom (Afrikaans: Large Thirstland Tree), is a baobab tree in Namibia which is found to the south of the Khaudum National Park. At around 2,100 years old, it is believed to be the oldest tree in the country. It is 14.3 m (47 ft) high, has a circumference of more than 30 m (98 ft) and keeps growing despite having fallen over. In 2006, two of its oldest relatives died. The previous oldest tree in the country, known as Grootboom, was 32 m (105 ft) high, but died in 2005.

The tree was where the Dorsland trekkers camped in 1883 and they carved the year of the visit, "1883", into the tree. In 1891 a detachment of German troops passed the tree and carved "1891" and the name of three in the group "H. Gathemann", "E. Heller" and "D. Hannemann" into the tree.
