= Tsootsha =

Village in Ghanzi District, Botswana

Coordinates: 22°08′35″S 20°51′38″E

Location of Tsootsha

Tsootsha, also known as Kalkfontein, is a village in Ghanzi District of Botswana. It is located close to the border with Namibia. The population was 1,397 in 2001 census.
