= New Xanagas =

Coordinates: 22°25′53″S 20°39′18″E

Location of New Xanagas

New Xanagas is a village in Ghanzi District of Botswana. It is located western part of the district. New Xanagas has a primary school and the population was 540 in 2001 census.
