= Humpata =

- Municipality and town
- Location in Angola
- Coordinates: 15°0′S 13°20′E
- Country: Angola
- Province: Huíla

Population (2014 Census)
  - Total: 89,144
- Time zone: UTC+1 (WAT)
- Climate: Cwb

Humpata is a town and municipality in the province of Huíla, Angola. The municipality had a population of 89,144 in 2014.

Humpata was the primary destination of the Trekboers on the Dorsland Trek in the 1870s. These Afrikaners formed the majority population in the area for some time, before leaving to South West Africa after World War I, though some stayed until 1975, on the onset of the Angolan Civil War.

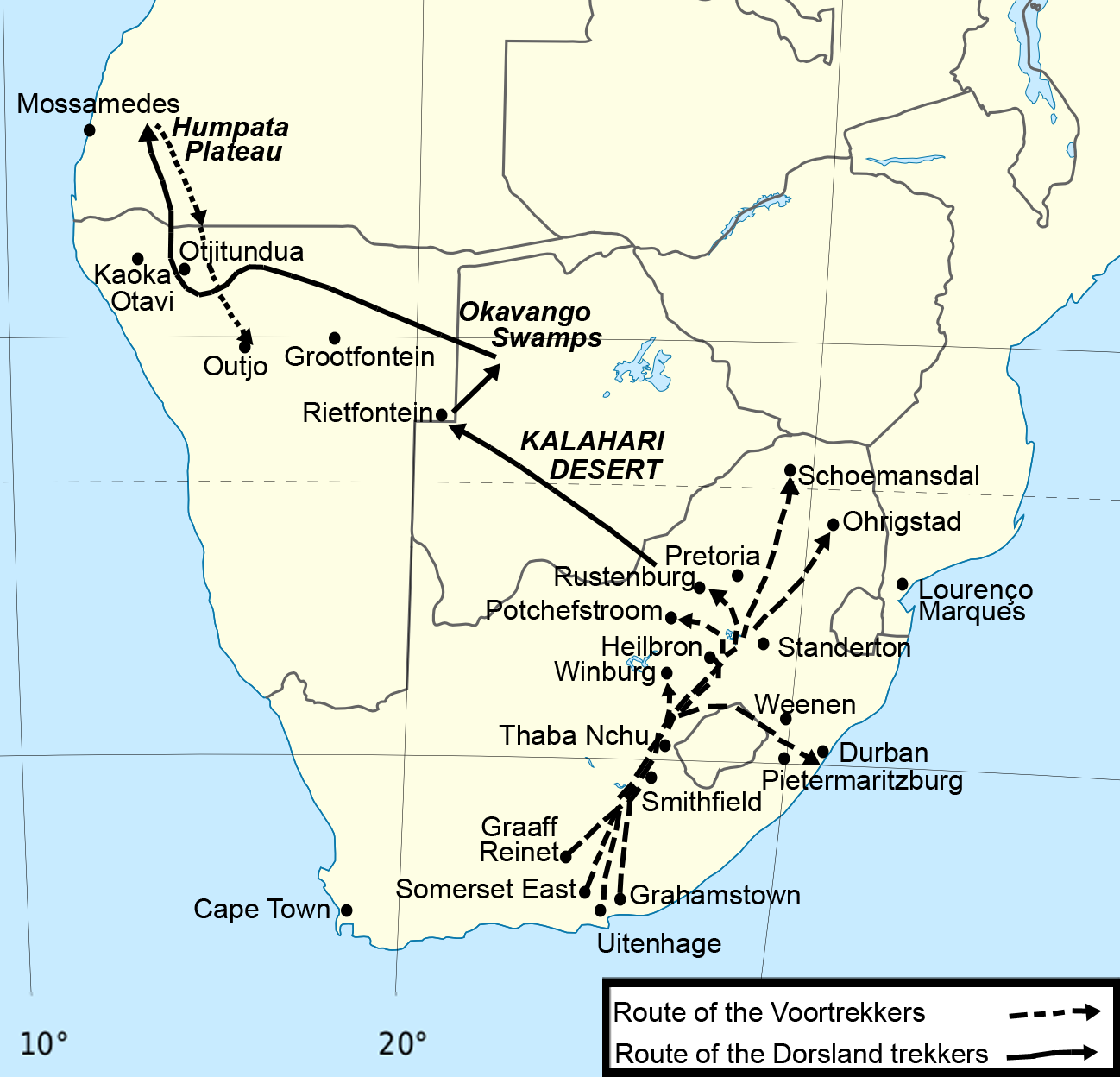
Map of the Route of the Dorsland Trekkers, ending in Humpata (solid line)

== See also ==
- Voortrekkers
- Dorsland Trek
- History of Angola
- Trekboers
