= Ben Bouwer =

Boer war general

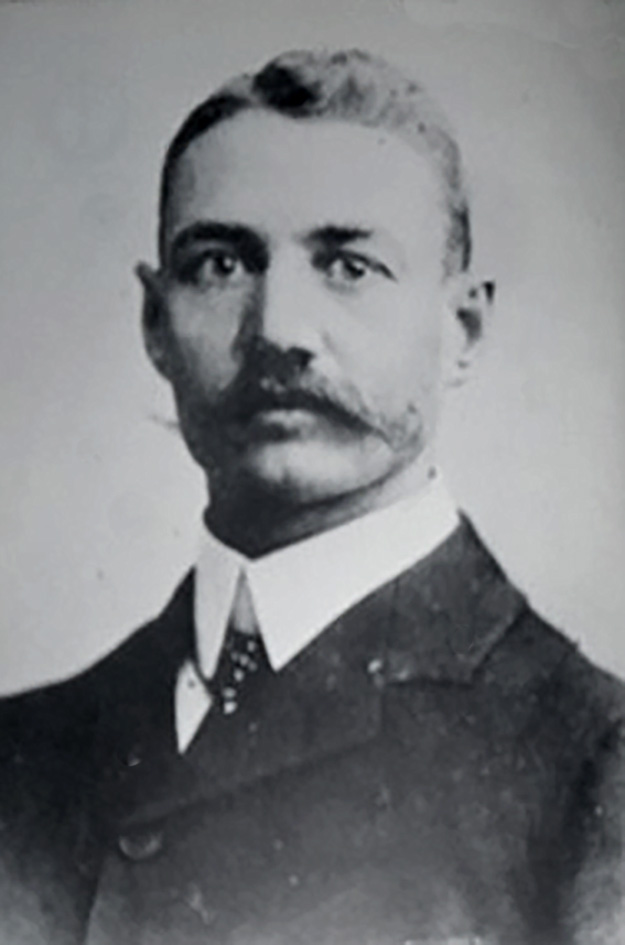
- Born: Barend Daniël Bouwer; January 31, 1875; Damaraland, Namibia
- Died: November 23, 1938 (aged 63); Cape Town, Union of South Africa
- Spouse: Marianne "Janie" Evelina Rood
- Military career
- Allegiance: South African Republic
- Branch: Transvaal Army
- Service years: 1894, 1899-1902, 1912-1938
- Rank: General
- Nickname: Ben
- Conflicts: Malaboch War (1894); Second Boer War: –Battle of Colenso, Battle of Spion Kop, Battle of Diamond Hill, Battle of Bergendal, Battle of Elands River (1901), Siege of Okiep; First World War: –South-West Africa Campaign, Conquest of Keetmansdorp

Barend Daniël Bouwer (Ben Bouwer, born during the Dorsland Trek, Damaraland, Southwest Africa, 31 January 1875 – Cape Town, 23 November 1938) was a South African general in the Boer War (1899–1902) and the First World War (1914–1918).

== Family ==
Ben Bouwer was born the second child and first son among seven children of Barend Daniel Bouwer (June 5, 1842 - January 10, 1907) and Hester Catharina Regina Engelbrecht (Potchefstroom, February 10, 1854 - Pretoria, July 9, 1941). Possibly his parents were in the first party of the Dorsland Trek starting out in May 1874 from the Transvaal. He grew up the northern part of what is now Namibia, where his father was an elephant hunter. Later his family moved to Angola where Bouwer went to a Portuguese primary school in Moçâmedes (Mossamedes, on the coast of South Angola). They returned to Transvaal where he completed his education, having mastered 11 languages, Ovambo and other Bantu languages included. Bouwer married Marianne "Janie" Evelina Rood (May 4, 1881 - March 8, 1970) by whom he had six children.

== Early years ==
During the 1890s Bouwer took part in several wars against indigenous people in the north of the Transvaal, including the Malaboch War (1894) commanded by Piet Joubert. Also in 1894 he was appointed a clerk in the office of this Commander-in-chief (Afrikaans: kommandant-generaal) of the South African Republic in Pretoria. On the occasion of the botched Jameson Raid (29 December 1895 – 2 January 1896) Bouwer together with Danie Theron delivered a message of the British representative at Pretoria agent sir Jacobus de Wet to Jameson ordering him in vain to stop his invasion. Later Bouwer was a government witness in the trial of Jameson in London. In the Transvaal Bouwer clerked in the office of staatsprokureur (Transvaal State Attorney) J.C. Smuts, the successor of Herman Coster.

== Boer War (1899–1902) ==
After the outbreak of the Anglo-Boer War (1899-1902) Bouwer joined the invasion of the British Natal Colony as part of the Ermelo Commando. He participated in the Battle of Colenso on 15 December 1899 and the Battle of Spion Kop (Afrikaans: Slag van Spioenkop) on 24 January 1900. While retreating from Natal Bouwer was added to the staff of general Louis Botha and joined him in the resistance of the Orange Free State in March 1900 against the onslaught of Lord Roberts's army northward.

After the British occupied Pretoria on 5 June 1900 Bouwer fought in the Battle of Diamond Hill (Afrikaans: Slag van Donkerhoek, 11–12 June 1900) and the Battle of Bergendal (Battle of Dalmanutha/Battle of Belfast, 21–27 August 1900). In September 1900 he was appointed veldkornet and second in command of Orange Free State president M.T. Steyn's escort through Transvaal to Orange Free State and performed successful operations under general Koos de la Rey until he started fighting under general Smuts near Potchefstroom in December 1900.

Bouwer attended the conference of Orange Free State and Transvaal leaders in May 1901 at Waterfall near Standerton and was wounded near Heidelberg. In August 1901 Bouwer together with Jacobus van Deventer served as Smuts's adjudant commanders in his invasion of the Cape Colony from Orange Free State. They surprised and defeated the C Squadron of the British 17th Lancers near Modderfontein in the Battle of Elands River (1901) on 19 September 1901 and continued south up to Port Elizabeth and then to the west reaching the environs of Calvinia at the beginning of November 1901.

When Smuts reorganised his troops in Cape Colony Bouwer became veggeneraal (fighting general). In January 1902, Bouwer's men found a British battle ship anchored at Doringbaai in Western Cape and chased it away by firing at it. Bouwer and van Deventer captured Windhoek at the end of February 1902. His operations in the North West included the siege of Okiep (April–May 1902) until after the Treaty of Vereeniging when he finally put his arms down near Vanrhynsdorp. In July 1902, he returned to Transvaal.

== First World War (1914–1918) and after ==
At the start of the First World War in 1914, Bouwer served in the new army of the Union of South Africa as a district officer at Graaff-Reinet. He opposed the Maritz rebellion of 1914 and tried in vain to persuade his former superior general Manie Maritz to desist. Afterwards he fought the Germans as a colonel in German South West Africa and conquered Keetmanshoop. At the end of the war Bouwer was appointed to the general army staff and had an army career in Potchefstroom, Pretoria, Oos-Londen and at the Castle of Good Hope in Cape Town. On 30 April 1931, he was pensioned with the rank of brigade general. Thereafter he was a member of the South African Filmsensorraad (Film Censor Board), responsible for the national classification and censorship of films. He received the South African Dekoratie voor Trouwe Dienst and Distinguished Service Order honours.

== Literature ==
- M. P. Bossenbroek, Yvette Rosenberg (Translator), The Boer War, Seven Stories Press, New York, NY, 2018. ISBN 9781609807474, 1609807472. Pages 365, 368–369, 374, 379, 381–382.
- J. E. H. Grobler, The War Reporter: the Anglo-Boer war through the eyes of the burghers, Johannesburg: Jonathan Ball Publishers, 2004. ISBN 978-1-86842-186-2. Pages 120, 126–127, 134, 140, 142, 150.
- Daniël Wilhelmus Krüger, in Krüger, prof. D.W. and Beyers, C.J. (eds.), Suid-Afrikaanse Biografiese Woordeboek, deel III. Kaapstad: Tafelberg-Uitgewers, 1977. In Afrikaans.
- Krüger DW (1977). "Bouwer, Barend Daniël". In De Kock WJ, Krüger DW, Beyers CJ, Basson JL (eds.). Dictionary of South African Biography Vol III (1st ed.). Cape Town: Tafelberg-Uitgewers. pp. 93–94. ISBN 0624008495. OCLC 1063845175.
- Potgieter, D.J. (ed.), Standard Encyclopaedia of Southern Africa, volume 2. Cape Town: Nasionale Opvoedkundige Uitgewery (Nasou), 1970.
- Reitz, Deneys, Commando: A Boer Journal of the Boer War, London, 1929.
- Pierre Jacques Le Riche, Barend Daniël Bouwer, O. J. O. Ferreira, Memoirs of General Ben Bouwer, Human Sciences Research Council, Pretoria, 1980.
