= Dorsland Trek =

Explorations of southern Africa by Boer settlers

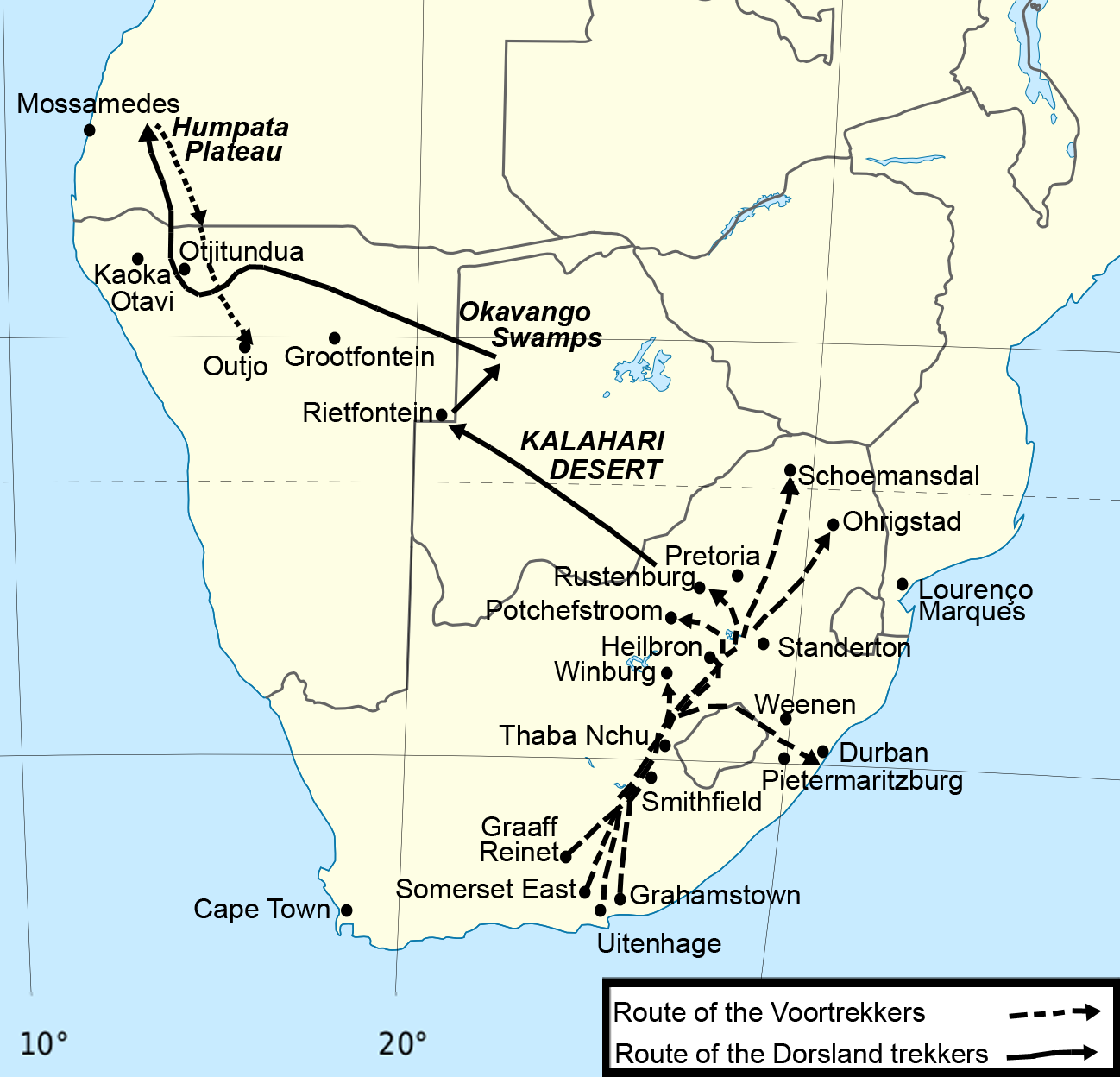
Map of the Route of the Dorslandtrekkers (solid line)

Dorsland Trek (Thirstland Trek) is the collective name of a series of explorations undertaken by Boer settlers from South Africa from 1874 to 1881, in search of political independence and better living conditions. The participants, Trekboers ("migrating farmers"; the singular is trekboer) from the Orange Free State and Transvaal, are called Dorslandtrekkers.

== Political background and previous treks ==
After the Great Trek a community arose that comprised a few Voortrekkers spread in different groups across a large geographical area in the Transvaal. However, there was no unity amongst them as there was no leader who could unite the different groups. Serious political and church disputes at some stage even led to a civil war.

After the Great Trek had initially impoverished the community, their geographic isolation resulted in further economic and intellectual isolation. Despite the lack of wealth or education, the average Transvaal Boer felt very independent. This easily escalated into stubbornness and the reluctance or inability to accept the authority of others. During the Great Trek and settlement afterwards, their education was completely neglected. As a result, the Transvaal Boers on the eve of the Thirstland Trek were a severely divided society, especially in terms of religion. They were therefore at a disadvantage in almost all aspects when compared to their peers in the rest of South Africa.

There was probably not one single reason for this, but rather a combination of reasons why a small group of aggrieved Boers decided to leave the Transvaal. The primary reasons for the Thirstland Trek were religious ones and expostulation against President Thomas Burgers’ progressive policy, specifically his new education legislation, the unpleasant circumstances in the Gereformeerde Kerk (Reformed Church) and the search for a New Jerusalem. Consequently, it was mainly the members of the Gereformeerde Kerk who participated in the Thirstland Trek. Political and economic reasons such as the fear of being regarded as equal to black people, uncertain political conditions, the fear of humanisation (in terms of opposition to new ideas), lack of land and population pressure, poverty and a fear of paying more tax could have played an additional, less important, role. It is clear that the so-called “trek spirit” played no role whatsoever during the trek. Opposition to British imperial expansion probably also did not play any significant part in the minds of most trekkers who left before April 1877. By far the majority of the Transvaal population and almost all the members of the other church denominations were not as unhappy as their compatriots with the circumstances and chose to remain in the Transvaal.

At spiritual level there were huge differences among the Thirstland Trekkers, who had a more conservative character, and their fellow citizens in the Transvaal. In a few instances the mental state of the Jerusalemgangers (a group of Voortrekkers in the Transvaal who wanted to trek overland to Jerusalem in Palestine) affected the Trekkers. Their conservative outlook on life also affected their level of education detrimentally. Almost all the people who met the Thirstland Trekkers commented on their low level of education.

The “mak volk” was a group of labourers who accompanied the Thirstland Trekkers and adapted the way of life and spiritual culture of the Trekkers. Despite the fact that an estimated 130–200 “mak volk” participated in the Thirstland Trek, they were mainly an “invisible” part of the Trek. Often their contribution to the Trek is ignored. In many reminiscences, narratives and statistics about the trek they are not even mentioned. They were descendants of the indigenous people of South Africa of which most of them were taken as children on the battlefield and were then raised by the trekkers. As a result of their shared experiences during the trek, a very close relationship arose between them and the white Thirstland trekkers.

== Routes of the trek ==
=== First Trek ===
The trekkers left the Transvaal in three different groups. After they trekked from the district Pretoria on 20 May 1874 and camped for a year next to the Limpopo, the first group of trekkers left the Transvaal in May 1875. This group of 10 families, altogether 60 persons besides the “mak volk” travelling with them, trekked with relatively little loss of cattle and people through the Thirstland and in September 1875 reached the Ngami lake. After a sojourn of two months at Ghanzi, they stayed for two years, from January 1876 to January 1878, at Rietfontein in the Sandveld. In the meantime, William Coates Palgrave, as representative of the Cape government, had discussions with the Herero and Nama-Oorlam captains about possible expansion of the British government's control in South Africa to Namaland and Hereroland. Palgrave's interference incited most of the Herero and Nama-Oorlam captains against the trekkers before the first trekker even set foot in the area. After the trekkers of the first trek group tried unsuccessfully for two years to obtain land in Namaland and Hereroland, they had to abandon this idea. By this time they were still unsure in which direction they should trek. Shortly after this they would merge with the trekkers of the second and third treks and continue their difficult sojourn through the unknown regions of southern Africa for a further three years.

Even before the first trek group had left the Transvaal, the first trekkers of the second trek began to trek from the districts Pretoria and Rustenburg in April 1875. After they reached Limpopo in May 1875, they aimlessly roamed around along the river while hunting to pass the time for two years until 1877. From time to time newcomers joined them. The Ngwato chief Khama, across whose land they had to trek at that stage, was still sympathetic towards them and gave them permission to trek through the Thirstland. In March 1876 they missed a golden opportunity to trek. It would seem as if this group of trekkers at that stage still did not know in which direction they wanted to trek.

By April 1876 the first cases of malaria broke out among them and in July 1876 the first of more than 160 persons who would perish of this disease, died. In the same period the region was drought-stricken while discord among the leaders surfaced. The relations between the trekkers and Khama also deteriorated. Khama withdrew his offer that they could trek across his region, presumably because of the grinding drought that made it impossible. It is estimated that at this stage the group comprised a total of 116 white families with 586 family members, apart from the unknown number of “mak volk”.

=== Second Trek ===
The second trek group eventually left the Limpopo on 10 April 1877 and trekked along the Mahalapye River without permission. A delegation from Khama, comprising the missionary Hepburn, the trader Alfred Musson as interpreter, and seven council members tried in vain to convince them not to take on this dangerous journey. There was suspicion about Khama's motives and his good advice that they should break up into smaller groups to trek across the Thirstland. The trekkers thought he wanted to divide them into smaller groups because it would then be easier for him to kill them in these groups.

Despite an agreement the trekkers reached the previous evening to trek in separate groups a few days apart, complete disorder prevailed when the first trekkers left Letloche on the morning of 7 May 1877 and the rest of the trek party followed them as one group. In the total absence of leadership there were no order and discipline and the stage was set for the disaster that followed.

During the next seven to ten days water spots such as Tlhabala, Inkowane and Lethlakane were the setting for shocking scenes: From the third day on these banks the terrified bellows of the cows and screams of other animals were indescribable. In their distress, some of the oxen stormed ahead and trampled a few watering holes to mush. Thereafter they completely lost control and ran off. Most were never found again or eventually died of thirst. The suffering of the trekkers was no less heart-breaking. At times water had to be rationed between them in spoons. Some were so desperate to take in any form of fluid to assuage their thirst that they slit the throats of sheep, goats or even dogs and drank their blood or intestinal fluids. Amazingly enough, none of the trekkers died of thirst, however malaria still caused deaths. In these dismal circumstances the leader of the trek, Commandant Louw du Plessis, took the blame for the disastrous trek and resigned.

=== Third Trek ===
After the Transvaal was annexed by Great Britain on 12 April 1877, a third group of trekkers, consisting of eight families of 40 people in addition to the “mak volk”, left that very same month, departing from the district of Rustenburg.

When the trekkers of the first two groups reached the Meers River, they remained there for two and a half months to recover from their disastrous journey and to take back the abandoned wagons to the Meers River. Since they only had 326 oxen left (about 20 teams) to pull roughly a hundred wagons, their progress was laborious. Ever so slowly they trekked further along the Meers River. At Sebetwane's Drift they established that 37 people had already died at that stage of the trek. But the worst was yet to come. Regulations for the trek were drawn up and a new leadership body was elected, with Jan Greyling as commandant. Meanwhile, help had arrived at Rietfontein in the form of some 184 draught oxen from the first trekker party and this speeded up the trek somewhat.

It took them 25 days to trek from Sebetwane's Drift to Lake Ngami, arriving there on 25 September 1877. Here the group split up. Ten to eleven families under Louw du Plessis trekked to Rietfontein to join the first trekker party, while the rest trekked northwestwards along the Okavango River.

Since October 1877, most of the group who had trekked along the Okavango River had died of malaria. Malaria once again took its toll on the trekkers and from October 1877, most of the group who trekked along the Okavango River, died of malaria. Here things took a turn for the worse as tsetse fly killed off their oxen and they had hardly any provisions left. Some of them lost hope and turned around, trekking back to the Transvaal. Most of the group trekked westward, directly into the desert to the Debraveld, to escape the double threat of malaria and the tsetse fly while another group continued on their trek along the Okavango because they feared being without water again. It was here that the Thirstland trek must have experienced its all-time low, since most deaths because of malaria and loss of livestock occurred during this time. Furthermore, a few people died after eating poisonous wild plants, and one person was murdered by Bushmen. When the first trek party, which had set off northwards from Rietfontein in January 1878, came across this group of trekkers, the indescribable wretchedness and dilapidated circumstances of these trekkers shocked them deeply. Because of the unhealthy conditions of the Debraveld, the trekkers had to continue their journey once again. The different trekker parties united, trekked further north, and then stayed over for a while at Leeupan and the Kaudum.

Of the group of ten families under Gert du Preez, comprising 65 individuals (the “mak volk” included), all of the men died and only three women and 19 children survived. When the other trekkers heard of their ordeal, an expedition was sent to rescue the survivors and bring them to the laager at Leeupan. Up until then, nothing had come of the trekker's main goal of finding a new and “better land to live in”, and on top of that, the trek had impoverished them even more. They were surrounded either by hostile black tribes or inhospitable areas and the trekkers eventually did not know where to go to from there. And still there was no end to their suffering.

=== Reunited Trek ===
After the three trek parties reunited at Leeupan in July 1878, new leadership was elected and regulations for a united trek were drawn up. Great confusion and differences of opinion still prevailed at this point. The majority continued trekking in the direction of the Okavango. Another group started hunting to sell to traders near the Okavango. Another group decided to turn back to the Transvaal, while a fourth group was scattered and fell behind. Even though the trekkers initially had good relations with the Kavango tribes, it eventually soured, and the trekkers had no choice but to move on. The Ovambo tribes further along the route were a threat to them, and so the trekkers were forced to deviate from the path and trek to a neutral area south of the Etosha Pan. They set up laager there for a while. It is unknown what the group who had trekked back to the Transvaal had thought of their failed trek, however, some members of this group still dared to cross through the Thirstland back to Angola again later.

=== Settlement in Angola ===
After an exploratory expedition identified a “resting place” in a largely uninhabited area – Kaokoland – the trekkers in May 1879 moved to Rusplaas (Otjitundua), Kaoko Otavi and a number of other scattered springs. Here they stayed for a period of 18 months until October 1880. At this location they built temporary houses, laid out gardens and lands for cultivation and hunted in the surrounding area. However, deaths from fever continued. While they were staying there, the first clash with an Ovambo tribe on Portuguese territory took place when seven men who were camped beside the Kunene were attacked by the OvaMbandja. In the course of the subsequent peace negotiations, the trekkers came into contact with the Portuguese. This interaction may well have planted the seed for their eventual trek to Angola a year later.

Reports about the disastrous trek and the trekkers’ predicaments eventually reached their compatriots in southern Africa and the Cape authorities. Following this, a number of relief committees were formed in the Cape Colony and the Orange Free State to collect money and supplies for the “destitute trekboers”. The Cape Relief Committee sent the collected goods to Damaraland aboard the schooner Christina. Richard Haybittel was contracted to deliver the consignment to the trekkers and, eventually, the provisions were handed over to the trekkers several months later. Some trekkers, who were so impoverished that they no longer had any draught animals to pull their wagons, availed themselves of the opportunity to return by ship from Walvis Bay to Cape Town and from there, with the help of charity organisations, returned to the Transvaal.

After negotiations, a Boer delegation and colonel Sebastião Nunes da Matta, the governor of Moçâmedes, concluded an agreement on 18 September 1880, in which the conditions were outlined under which the trekkers would be permitted to settle in Angola. Once the trekkers had set off on their trek from Kaokoland to Angola in November 1880, this was followed by a second agreement, signed on 28 December, in which the conditions of settlement were very similar to those in the earlier agreement.

Even though by 1880 the coast of Angola had been colonised by the Portuguese for 300 years already, one could hardly regard this as an occupation of the interior of Angola by them. The arrival of the Boers in Angola took place against the background of the juridical abolition of slavery and attempts by the Portuguese authorities to promote white colonisation of the interior of Angola. In light of the reputation of the Boers as good combatants, the Portuguese authorities believed that the trekkers could support them in fending off the double threat they faced: the indigenous tribes and the possible intervention of the British. They also hoped that the Boers could assist in stimulating trade and developing the country, and therefore the Boers were welcomed with open arms. On 4 January 1881 Humpata was identified as the site of the proposed Boer settlement and later that same month the Boers began to build a dam and an irrigation canal. Once town plots had been laid out and apportioned to the residents, the construction of dwellings began. Years of difficult acclimatisation followed. A group of Boers who had not immediately trekked to Humpata but had instead continued with their hunting endeavours along the Okavango and then trekked deeper into Angola, only joined the Boers at Humpata in 1883. The number of Boers in the settlement increased with the further arrival of individuals and small groups who were no longer able to make a satisfactory living in Damaraland after the outbreak of the Second Nama-Herero War. By 1 July 1883 the Boer settlement at Humpata comprised 325 Boers and 43 of their “mak volk”.

Eventually approximately 700 individuals (aside from an unknown number of black labourers) had left the Transvaal between 1874 and 1877 in three separate trek parties. During their epic journey, roughly 230 white trekkers had died and about the same number had returned to the Transvaal. Approximately 130 babies were born during the trek, but nevertheless only 370 individuals reached their promised land.

== Jerusalemgangers ==
The Jerusalemgangers or Enselin party were a group of Boers originating in Transvaal that held a set of beliefs that were a mix between politics and religion which were considered eccentric and fanatical by outsiders. Some of their more characteristic beliefs were: The idea of trekking by land all the way to Jerusalem, (an idea based on their belief that Jerusalem was about as far from Transvaal as the Kaap) and settling there, an extreme aversion to the cape church (because of their links to the British), their view of Britain as one of the horns of the beast in the Biblical Book of Revelation, and their general aversion to the British, even coming as far as to call them the antichrist.

There are records of them as far back as 1836 in the Black Mountains between the Great and Little Karoo. Their leader was Johan Adam Enslin (1800–1852), a former blacksmith in the Cape Colony, who was known as "the Prophet". They moved from the vicinity of present-day Tarkastad to Natal in 1837 to the Free State and finally the Transvaal after the British annexation in 1844.

Because they identified themselves with the chosen Israel on the journey to Jerusalem, they were given the name "Jerusalemites," but many scholars are convinced that the distinctive feature of the Enslin group was not religious in nature, but that it rather was their radical dislike of everything English.

The Jerusalemites were convinced the Promised land could not be too far since they had observed Arabian horses in the possession of Native tribes. In the South African Biographical Dictionary, J.P. Claasen said the Jerusalemites did make preparations for the trip to Jerusalem. They called the Dutch mediator between the Boer factions in Transvaal H.T. Bührmann (1822–1890) asked how far Jerusalem was from the Marico. They felt the trek would take no more than six weeks or two months with the oxcart if all went well. The Dutchman tried to make it clear to them that Jerusalem was about seven or eight times as far as Cape Town from Rustenburg, that there were insurmountable difficulties in the way, that they had no Moses, and that Palestine was at that time a semi-desert and a den of robbers.

== Great Trek from Angola ==
In 1928 many Boers decided to leave Angola and head south to South-West Africa (then under South African jurisdiction), where settlement was easier and not impeded on by the Portuguese authorities. The repatriation was conducted by the South African government under J. B. M. Hertzog. From August 1928 to February 1929, 1,922 Boers were repatriated to South Africa. 420 trek certificates were issued to families, though only 373 families left Angola at the time. The final Boer families to return to South Africa under this repatriation left Angola in 1931. The first "Great trek from Angola" child born on the South West African side was Dirk Hendrik Ackerman (11 December 1928)

== Historical impact ==
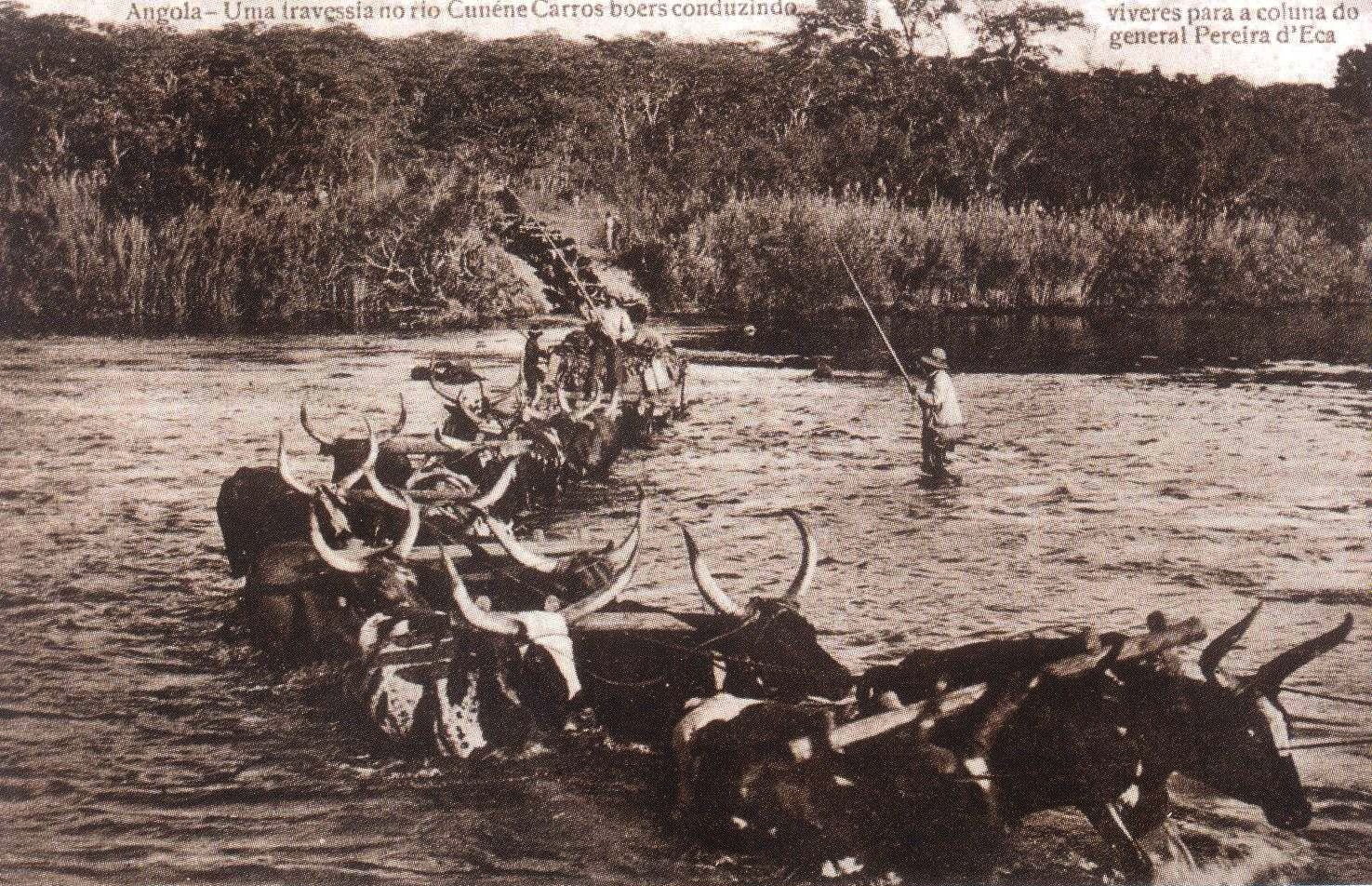
Boer wagons crossing the Cunene River

The Boers were not well received everywhere. As early as 1874, Herero chiefs Maharero, Kambazembi, and Christian Wilhelm Zeraua requested the Cape authorities to intervene with their settlement in Damaraland. As a result, a position of Special Commissioner for Damaraland was created. In the area around Gobabis, Kaiǀkhauan Kaptein Andreas Lambert on behalf of all leaders of Damaraland threatened to harm them if they did not leave.

== Remains and commemorations of the Dorsland Trek ==
- In Kaokoland, several ruins of temporary settlements are still visible, including a Dopper church (Dopper type of hairstyle that resembled a helmet, dop) is an informal name for the Gereformeerde Kerke) near Kaoko Otavi.
- Outside Swartbooisdrift the Dorsland Trekkers Monument has been erected to commemorate the journey.
- At Cassinga there is a memorial obelisk, erected in 2003, commemorating those who died during the trek.
- At Humpata there is a large obelisk, erected in 1958 commemorating the Trekkers, and there are several graves of the settlers, including that of their leader, Gert Alberts.
- The Dorsland tree in the remote east of Namibia bears a carving "1883", created when the tree was temporary shelter

== Notable Dorsland trekkers ==
- Gert Alberts
- Ben Bouwer, born during Dorsland Trek in 1875
- Jan H van der Merwe

== See also ==
- Voortrekkers
- History of South Africa
- History of Namibia
