= Lyman Gilmore =

Aviation pioneer

Lyman Wiswell Gilmore

Lyman Wiswell Gilmore Jr. (June 11, 1874 – February 18, 1951) was an American aviation pioneer. In Grass Valley, California, he built a steam-powered airplane and claimed that he flew it on May 15, 1902. Due to the requirement of a heavy boiler and the dependency on coal as a power source, the flights would have been unsustainable. Records and evidence relating to his claim were lost in a 1935 hangar fire.

== First flight ==
Gilmore, in a 1936 interview, reported a successful tethered glider flight in 1893 and a free glider flight in 1894. Gilmore further added that (although he had not reported it until 1927) he made a controlled steam-powered flight on May 15, 1902; however, all records and papers related to his aircraft were destroyed in a fire.

There are photographs from 1898 showing Gilmore's machine, but none showing it in the air. The claims of the aircraft achieving flight are unconfirmed, and given the weight evident by the grounded aircraft photos, the possibility of flight is highly unlikely. In 2012, a writer for the Smithsonian magazine concluded "there is no evidence of a Gilmore machine in the air".

== Work ==
Lyman Gilmore was in contact with other flight pioneers like Samuel Langley and, eventually, the Wright brothers.

In 1902, Gilmore was granted two patents on steam engines. He invented in other areas too: for example, a rotary snowplow. On March 15, 1907, Gilmore opened the first commercial airfield, Gilmore Airfield, in Grass Valley. There is now a middle school named in his honor on the site of the airfield.

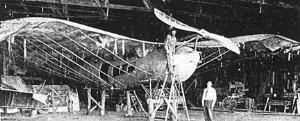
Gilmore's second, larger airplane

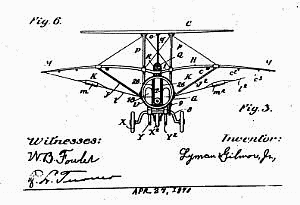
Drawing of the smaller first plane

In 1935, Lyman's airplane hangar and the two aging monoplanes were destroyed by fire. The fire cancelled plans to exhibit the larger monoplane at the World Fair in Chicago. Gilmore began mining for gold and died a poor man in Nevada City, California. His grave can be found in Pine Grove Cemetery, about a half mile outside of town.

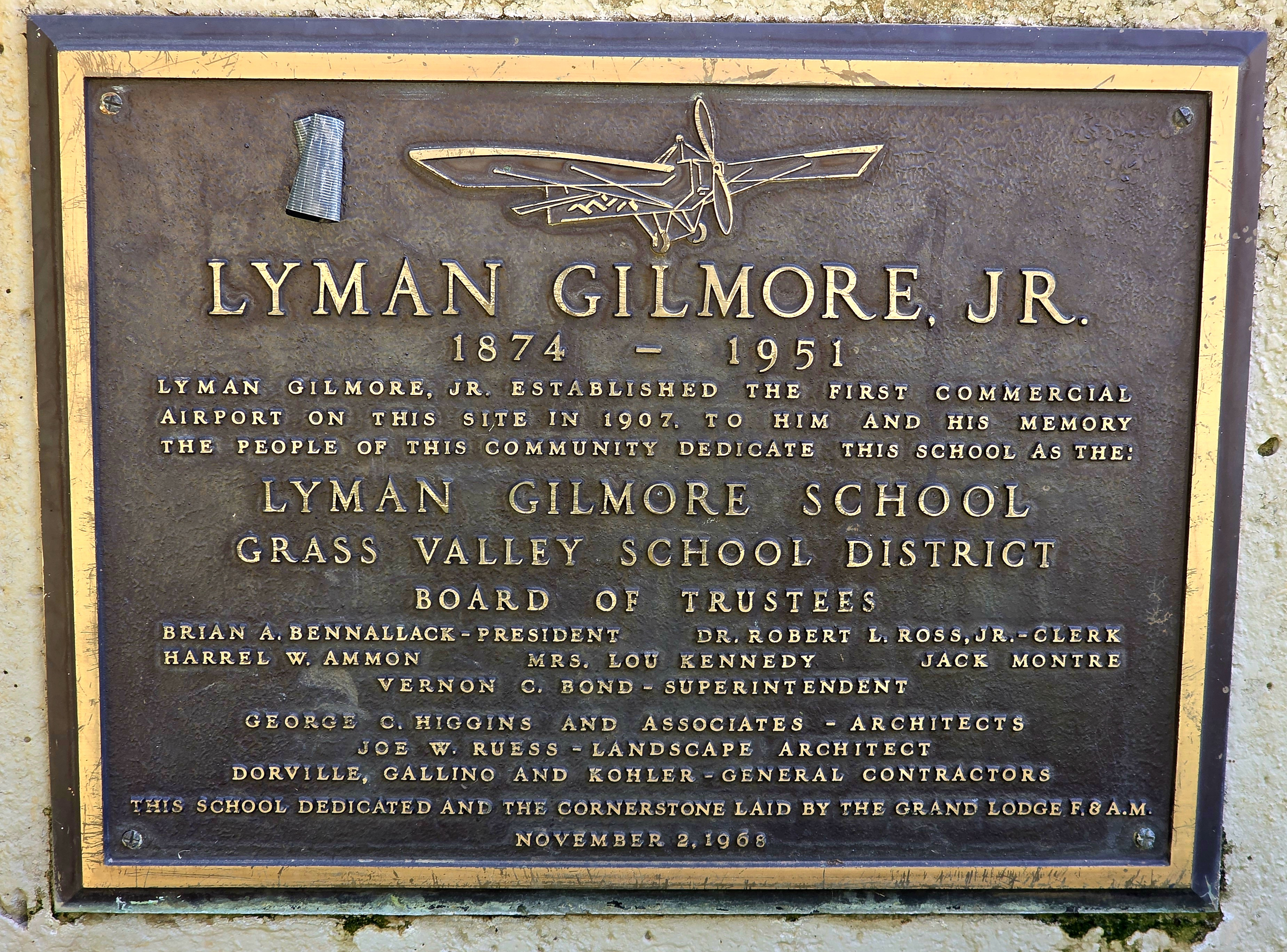
Lyman Gilmore School plaque

The Lyman Gilmore Middle School in Grass Valley has the motto, "Flying into the Future" and a mural depicting first flight. School children made a YouTube presentation about Gilmore including old video footage of Gilmore and an interview with people who knew him.

== See also ==
- Early flight - for other pre-Wright-brothers inventors.
- Mystery airship
