= Makunda =

Coordinates: 22°22′57″S 20°6′47″E

Location of Makunda

Makunda is a village in Ghanzi District of Botswana. It is located close to the Namibian border. The population was 331 in 2001 census.
