= Ncojane =

Coordinates: 23°08′02″S 20°17′42″E

Location of Ncojane

Ncojane or Nojane is a town in the Kalahari Desert of Ghanzi District, western Botswana. It is located 20 kilometres from the border with Namibia, and it has a primary School called Ncojane Primary School and secondary school called Marakanelo Community Junior Secondary School and a clinic. The population was 1,439 in 2001 census.
