= Ghanzi =

- Town
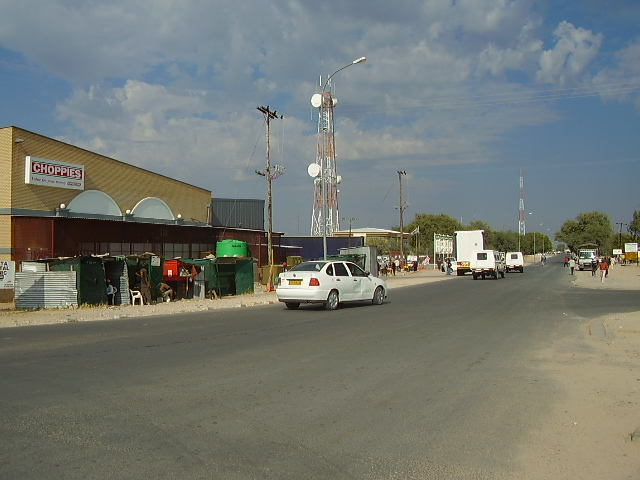
- A view of a Ghanzi street

- Location in Botswana
- Coordinates: 21°42′S 21°49′E
- Country: Botswana
- District: Ghanzi District

Area
  - Land: 1,800 km^{2} (690 sq mi)
- Elevation: 1,420 m (4,660 ft)

Population (2021)
  - Total: 21,420
  - Density: 12/km^{2} (31/sq mi)
- Climate: BSh

Ghanzi is a town in the middle of the Kalahari Desert the western part of the Republic of Botswana in southern Africa. The region is known within the country for its beef industry. In fact, Ghanzi farmers provide about 75% percent of national beef exports, according to the Botswana Meat Commission, primarily to the United Kingdom and the European Union.

At the time of the 2021 census, there are 21,420 people living in the town with another 6,900 nearby. Ghanzi is the administrative center of Ghanzi District and is considered the "capital" of the district, as it is the largest in terms of population and geographical measure. Ghanzi District measures 117,910 square kilometres (29,140,000 acres) and is bordered by Ngamiland to the north, Central District to the east, and Kgalagadi and Kweneg Districts to the south. Its western border is shared with Namibia.

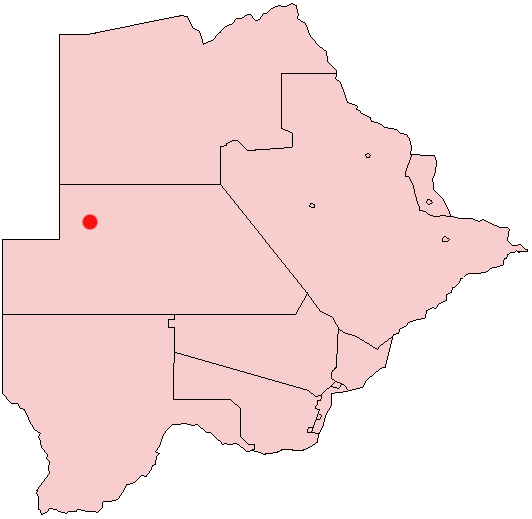
Location of Ghanzi in Botswana

== Name ==
Other spellings of Ghanzi include "Gantsi" - which is more consistent with Setswana, the national language of Botswana - "Ghansi"; and "Ghantsi". It has also been purported that the various renderings of Ghanzi actually stem from the Naro language word "Gaentsii", meaning "gigantic swollen buttocks", referring to the body part of an antelope, and later cattle that congregated around a pan in the area.

== History ==
The first Afrikaner to settle in Ghanzi was the flamboyant Hendrik van Zyl, who crossed the Kalahari and set up a small hunting and trading enterprise in the area around 1870 and gained extravagant wealth in the ivory trade. However, the first substantial Boer migration into Ghanzi began around 1897–1898.

The place known today as Ghanzi was first called "Kamp". The Kalahari Arms Hotel and the Barclays bank in Ghanzi were some of the first businesses established in Ghanzi.

The town of Ghanzi was the subject of a 1988 LA Times article which described the close-knit relationship between resident Afrikaners and Bushmen. At the time, there was no radio or television in Ghanzi, and the Kalahari Arms Hotel, which was surrounded by a 9 foot high fence to keep lions out, hosted the only bar and discotheque in the area.

== Residents ==
Ghanzi is a place of different ethnic groups such as Afrikaners, Basarwa, Bakgalagadi and Baherero, who all have a spirit of tolerance. Residents of this place speak different languages such as Afrikaans, English, Sesarwa, Setswana, Sekgalagadi and Seherero, but their standard language is Shekgalagari and Naro. Though there is no available information as to the current numbers of the Afrikaner population, in 1973, Kalahari Boer made up about 10% of the population in Ghanzi.

== Geology and climate ==
The district's land surface mainly consists of gently undulating sandveld which lies between 1,100 and 1,230 meters above sea level. The Kalahari is the largest continuous stretch of sand in the world, covering some 2,500 km^{2}. Karoo sediments, covered by younger basaltic lavas, underlie most of the Kalahari sands and about half of the country of Botswana. The sands of the Kalahari vary in depth from 5m to 200m.

The climate is semi-arid. Mean maximum daily temperatures are 33-45 °C in January and around 22 °C in July; mean minimum temperatures are 4 to -5 °C in the winter months. The long-term mean annual rainfall is around 375mm although this can vary by up to 50% year by year. Generally speaking, both the climate and the soils are unfavorable for arable farming. Small cultivation is spread over the district but is limited to subsistence crops of maize, sorghum, beans, peas, and melons. The record high temperature ever registered in Ghanzi was 42.2 °C (108.0 °F). The lowest temperature registered in Ghanzi was −8.5 °C (16.7 °F).

Climate data for Ghanzi (1971–2000)
Month	Jan	Feb	Mar	Apr	May	Jun	Jul	Aug	Sep	Oct	Nov	Dec	Year
Mean daily maximum °C (°F)	32.4 (90.3)	31.9 (89.4)	31.1 (88.0)	29.3 (84.7)	26.9 (80.4)	24.1 (75.4)	24.0 (75.2)	27.2 (81.0)	31.2 (88.2)	33.2 (91.8)	33.6 (92.5)	33.3 (91.9)	29.9 (85.7)
Mean daily minimum °C (°F)	19.3 (66.7)	18.7 (65.7)	17.0 (62.6)	13.2 (55.8)	8.2 (46.8)	4.5 (40.1)	4.1 (39.4)	7.0 (44.6)	11.8 (53.2)	15.9 (60.6)	17.8 (64.0)	18.9 (66.0)	13.0 (55.5)
Average rainfall mm (inches)	104.0 (4.09)	94.8 (3.73)	66.4 (2.61)	26.7 (1.05)	4.9 (0.19)	0.2 (0.01)	0.0 (0.0)	0.6 (0.02)	4.5 (0.18)	26.4 (1.04)	39.8 (1.57)	70.7 (2.78)	439 (17.27)
Average rainy days (≥ 10 mm)	3	3	2	1	0	0	0	0	0	1	1	3	14
Source: World Meteorological Organization

== Commercial developments ==
Ghanzi has three banks – Absa Bank, First National Bank, Stanbic Bank and Bank Gaborone, all of which have ATMs. Ghanzi now has three shopping centres: Ghanzi Spar, ShopRite, Fours, Trans, Shoppers and Choppies, another retailer in Botswana.

Ghanzi Airport serves the town. There is currently no scheduled service, only charter and private operations.

== Tourism and events ==
Ghanzi is well known countrywide for its annual agricultural show usually held in August each year. The show was first held in 1974 with initial aim to exhibit livestock breeds, for the longest time livestock breeds exhibition has dominated part of the activities of the show. However, in recent years crop production exhibition has gained a spot in the show as way of diversifying activities of the show and the agricultural aspect of the region. Stakeholders and government departments like Local Enterprise Authority also exhibits at the show. Actions are also held at the premises and BDF (Botswana Defense Force) usually comes to show their weaponry.

Ghanzi is a stop over point for travellers wishing to visit the Okavango Delta; there are many lodges in the area and three filling stations. It is the only available fill-up point between Kang and Maun, which is about 500 kilometres (311 mi), if one are travelling to the Okavango Delta. There is one hotel in Ghanzi town, the Kalahari Arms Hotel which offers accommodation and has a restaurant and bar open to non-residents. Tau Tona Lodge is another hotel approximately 6 kilometres (4 mi) from the centre of town it also has accommodation and a restaurant and bar open to non-residents. Less formal accommodation, food and drink is available at Thakadu Camp about 6 kilometres (4 mi) from the centre of town. There are other B&Bs and lodges scattered throughout the town.

There are some interesting things to see in Ghanzi. Kuru, which is a charity assisting the San / Bushmen has a small shop selling hand made Bushmen crafts. There are few sightseeing spots in Ghanzi - lions are kept in enclosures at the main gate of TauTona. "Ghanzi gat" is a hole that was made while the tar road was being made in Ghanzi, but while using dynamite to break the rock open, the people accidentally opened a water vein. This filled the 40 metres (130 ft) deep hole with water.

== Agriculture ==
Ghanzi is primarily dominant in cattle farming industry in Botswana. Today the town features a thriving Afrikaner cattle ranching industry.

== Mining ==
A large copper-silver deposit is being outlined at Ghanzi by Hana Mining.

== Timeline ==
- 1989: Telephone service installed in Ghanzi using solar powered towers
- 1990: Education center opened for teacher and government workers ongoing education
- 1993: First private school (Pioneer Academy) opened
- 1995: Senior secondary school opened in Ghanzi
- 1995: (November) Cosmos opened a branch in Ghanzi
- 1999: Paved road completed linking Ghanzi with Gaborone, the national capital
- 2000: Major flooding of Ghanzi and surrounding areas
- 2001: True Love Waits, an interdenominational abstinence education and support program, launched
- 2006: Broadband services are tested and introduced by GFS (Ghanzi Farmer Supplies) in conjunction with Winagain Holdings
- 2008: New shopping complex opened in February 2008 with superstores like Choppies, COSMOS, JB Sport and Pep
- 2010: (March) GFS sold interests in ISP business
- 2010: (April) Winagain Holdings gained licence to provide broadband services in Ghanzi, opening a hotspot at Kalahari Arms Hotel
- 2014: New mall scheduled for completion
- 2014: Winagain Holdings increased bandwidth with Ghanzi's first private fiber connection
- 2023: Major flooding of Ghanzi and surrounding areas
