= Ghanzi District =

Ghanzi Gantsi
- District
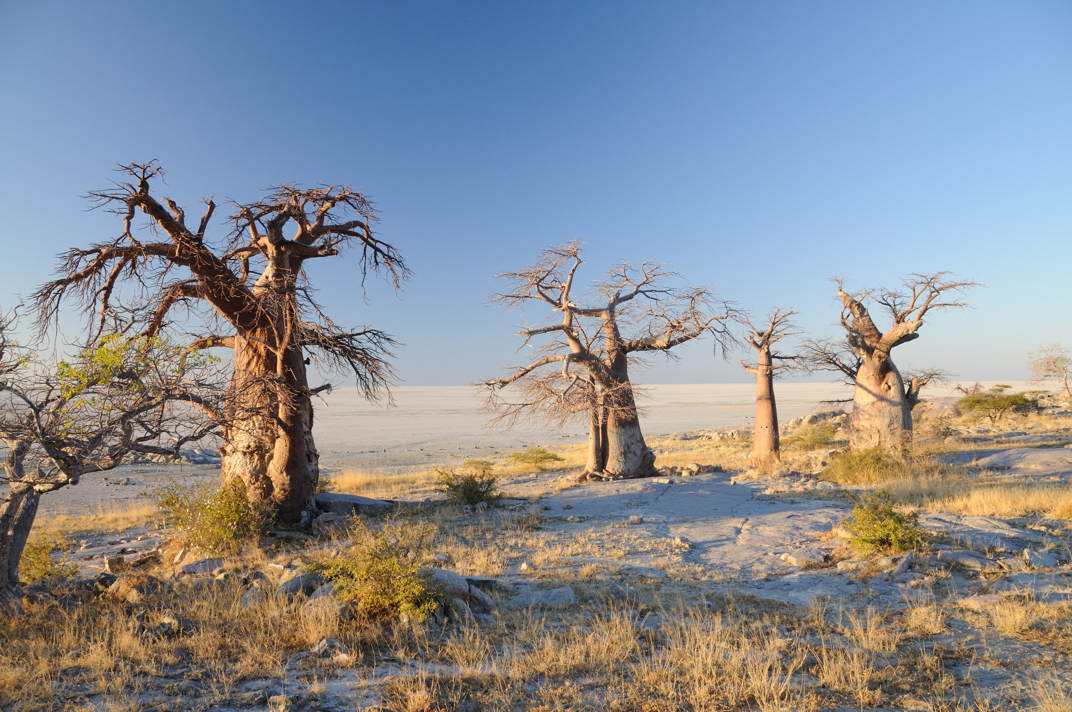

- Location within Botswana
- Coordinates: 22°00′S 22°00′E
- Country: Botswana
- Capital: Ghanzi

Area
  - Total: 117,910 km^{2} (45,530 sq mi)

Population (2022 census)
  - Total: 56,555
  - Density: 0.47965/km^{2} (1.2423/sq mi)
- Time zone: UTC+2 (Central Africa Time)
- HDI (2017): 0.666 medium · 10th

Ghanzi (sometimes Gantsi) is a district in western Botswana, bordering Namibia in the west and extending east into much of the interior of the country. The district's administrative centre is the town of Ghanzi. Most of the eastern half of Ghanzi makes up the Central Kalahari Game Reserve. The human population at the 2022 census was 56,555, less populous than that of any other district in Botswana. Ghanzi's area is 117,910 km².

In the west, Ghanzi borders the Omaheke Region of Namibia. Domestically, it borders the following districts: North-West on the north, Central on the east, Kweneng on the southeast, Kgalagadi on the south. Ghanzi, Central Kalahari Game Reserve, Deception Valley, Ghanzi Craft, Kgalagadi Transfrontier Park and Khutse Game Reserve are the major game areas in the district.

The district is administered by a district administration and district council which are responsible for local administration.

The contemporary San art movement originated in Ghanzi District. It was started in 1990 by a local NGO, Kuru Development Trust, that provided aid to the San people of the district.

== Geography ==
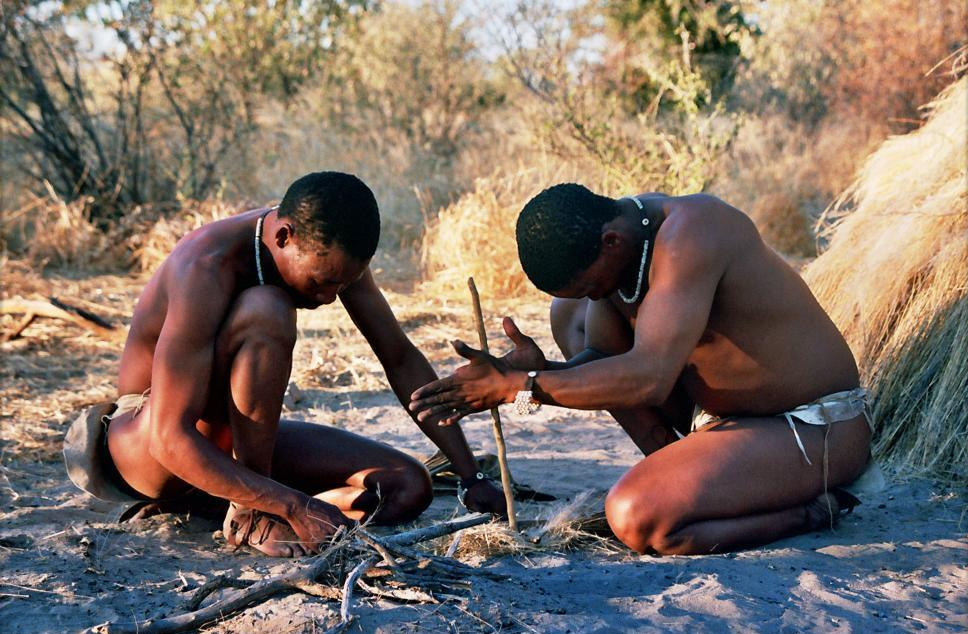
Bushman at Deception Valley in the District

In the west, Ghanzi borders the Omaheke Region of Namibia. Domestically, it borders the following districts: North-West on the north, Central on the east, Kweneng on the southeast, Kgalagadi on the south. Ghanzi is traversed by the northwesterly line of equal latitude and longitude. This region is largely covered by the Kalahari Desert, some of which is also covered by the Makgadikgadi Pans, a large seasonal wetland. The Makgadigadi was one of the Earth's largest lakes during the Pleistocene, but currently provides a vast summer wetland to support tens of thousands of migrating flamingos in the rainy summer season. The largest town in the district is the capital Ghanzi with a population of 21,420 according to the 2011 census, which is fifteen times more than the second-largest village Ncojane has. Most part of Botswana has tableland slopes sliding from east to west. The region has an average elevation of around 550 m (1,800 ft) above the mean sea level. The vegetation type is Savannah, with tall grasses, bushes and trees on the eastern sides, but it is arid in the Central and Western regions. The annual precipitation is around 25 cm (9.8 in), most of which is received during the summer season from November to May. Most of the rivers in the region are seasonal which are prone to flash floods, being the most prominent. The tourist and game reserves in the region are Ghanzi, Central Kalahari Game Reserve, Deception Valley, Ghanzi Craft, Kgalagadi Transfrontier Park, Khutse Game Reserve and Kuru Museum and Cultural Centre.

== Demographics ==
Historical population
Year	Pop.	±%
1981	19,096	—
1991	24,719	+29.4%
2001	33,170	+34.2%
2011	43,355	+30.7%
2022	56,555	+30.4%
Source: Census of Botswana

As of 2011, the total population of the district was 43,355 compared to 33,170 in 2001. The growth rate of population during the decade was 2.71. The population in the district was 2.14 per cent of the total population in the country. The sex ratio stood at 107.41 for every 100 males, compared to 104.07 in 2001. The average house hold size was 2.94 in 2011 compared to 4.21 in 2001. There were 1,424 craft and related workers, 615 clerks, 3,730 people working in elementary occupation 230 Legislators, Administrators & managers 534 Plant & machine operators and assemblers, 131 professionals, 1,043 service workers, shop & market sales workers, 771 skilled agricultural & related workers 509 technicians and associated professionals, making the total work force to 9,015.

== Economy and education ==
As of 2011, there were a total of 23 schools in the district, with 1.70 per cent private schools. The total number of students in the Council schools was 7,202 while it was 69 in private schools. The total number of students enrolled in the district was 7,271: 3,645 girls and 3,626 boys. The total number of qualified teachers was 305: 185 female and 120 male. There were around 17 temporary teachers, 17 male and 34 female. There were no untrained teachers in the district.

As of 2006, 3,507 were involved in agriculture, 323 in construction, 724 in education, 43 in electricity and water, 121 in finance, 264 in health, 83 in hotels and restaurants, 560 in manufacturing, 93 in other community services, 399 in private households, 1,849 in public administration, 355 in real estate, 185 in transport and communications, 1,788 in wholesale and retail trade. The total number of workers was 10,294: 5,959 male and 4,335 female.

== Administration ==
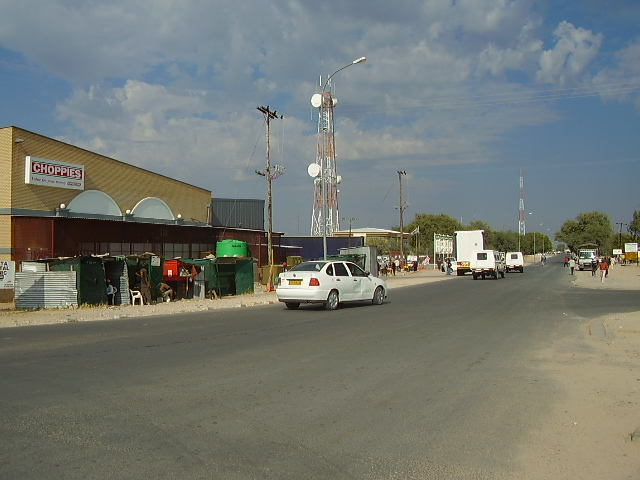
High Street in Ghanzi

Botswana gained independence from the British in 1966 and adapted the colonial administration framework to form its district administration. The policies were modified during 1970-74 to address some of the basic issues. The district is administered by a district administration and district council which are responsible for local administration. The policies for the administration are framed by the Ministry of Local Government. The major activities of the council are Tribal Administration, Remote Area Development and Local Governance. The executive powers of the council are vested on a commissioner appointed by the central government. Technical services wing of the Department of Local Government is responsible for developing roads, infrastructure in villages like water supply, schools and recreational facilities. All the staff of the local administration expect District Administration are selected via Unified Local Government Services (ULGS) and the Ministry of Local Government is responsible for their training, deployment and career development. Charles Hill Sub-District, Ghanzi Sub-District are the two sub districts of the district.

== See also ==
- Nwetwe Pan
- Sub-districts of Botswana
