= Alyn Ware =

Educator and campaigner

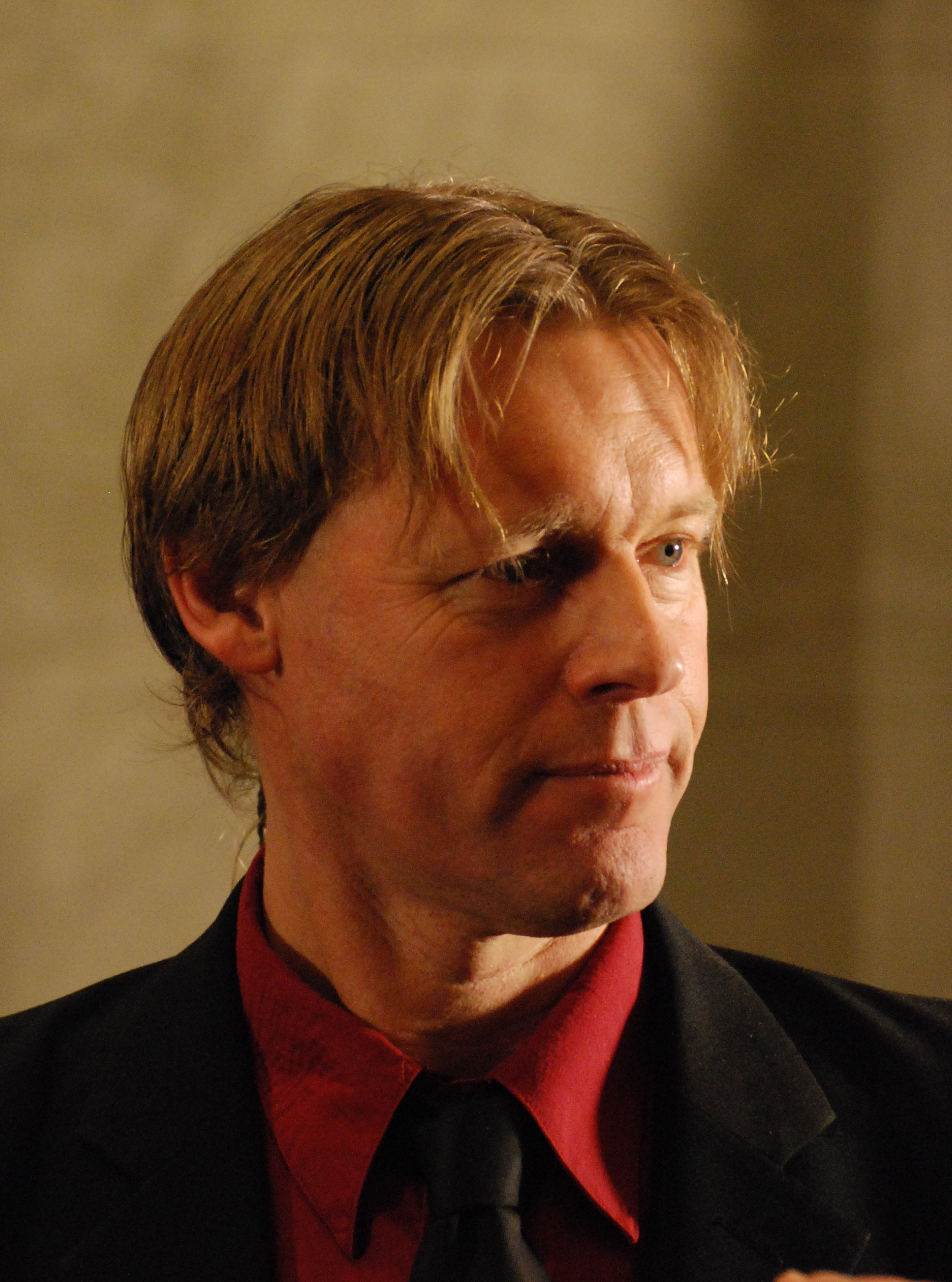
- Ware in 2009
- Born: 21 March 1962 (age 64)
- Education: University of Waikato
- Occupations: Peace educator and campaigner
- Organization: Parliamentarians for Nuclear Non-Proliferation and Disarmament
- Awards: Right Livelihood Award

Alyn (Alan) Ware (born 21 March 1962) is a New Zealand peace educator and campaigner in the areas of peace, non-violence, nuclear abolition, international law, women's rights, children's rights and the environment. He has served as the Global Coordinator for Parliamentarians for Nuclear Nonproliferation and Disarmament since it was founded in 2002.

His previous positions include Director of Aotearoa Lawyers for Peace, Executive Director of the Lawyers Committee on Nuclear Policy (USA), Director of the Peace Foundation Schools Outreach Programme for the UN Decade for a Culture of Peace, and Founding Director of the Mobile Peace Van.

Ware has won a number of awards, including the Right Livelihood Award (Sweden), United Nations International Year for Peace Award (New Zealand), Winston Churchill Memorial Trust Award (New Zealand), Alliance for Nuclear Accountability Award (USA) and Tom Perry Peace Award (Canada).

== Peace education ==
Ware trained in early childhood education at the University of Waikato (he received the university's Distinguished Alumni Award in 2010) and taught in kindergartens prior to establishing the Mobile Peace Van, which toured schools leading classes and training teachers in conflict resolution and other aspects of peace education. He co-founded Our Planet in Every Classroom (a peace and environmental education program that reached nearly 1,000 classrooms) and was a member of the government advisory body that developed the Peace Studies Guidelines that became part of the New Zealand school curriculum. He co-founded the Cool Schools Peer Mediation Programme which has been implemented in nearly 1/3 of New Zealand schools. For his early peace education work, Ware was awarded the United Nations International Year of Peace (New Zealand) Award in 1986.

== Nuclear abolition ==
Ware was active in the 1980s campaign to ban nuclear weapons from New Zealand. He was founder of the Hamilton Nuclear Weapon Free Zone Committee. In 1992 he moved to New York to coordinate an effort at the United Nations to achieve a ruling from the International Court of Justice on the illegality of nuclear weapons (achieved in 1996).

In 1995 he co-founded the Abolition 2000 Global Network to Eliminate Nuclear Weapons – which has grown to include more than 2,000 organizations in over 90 countries. He continues to serve on its international Coordinating Committee. Ware also serves on the coordinating board of the Middle Powers Initiative, which he helped found in 1998. A key focus for Ware has been the promotion of a nuclear weapons convention – a global treaty to prohibit and eliminate nuclear weapons.

Ware has been a leader in UN resolutions adopted on this issue, drafting a Model Nuclear Weapons Convention which has been circulated by the UN Secretary-General, and building support for this in parliaments and civil society.

In 2010 he founded the Nuclear Abolition Forum, a website and periodical to facilitate dialogue on the process to achieve and sustain a nuclear-weapons-free world. In 2012 he co-founded the Basel Peace Office.

== International law – prevention of war ==
Ware is an advocate for the use of legal and political mechanisms to resolve conflicts and prevent war. In 1990 he established the Gulf Peace Team office in New York and lobbied the UN Security Council on peaceful solutions to the Gulf Crisis.

In 1991 he worked for the World Federalist Movement monitoring developments at the UN on the proposed International Criminal Court in preparation for the launch of the Coalition for an International Criminal Court (CICC) - which was successful in establishing the ICC. Ware led the CICC Working Group on Weapons Systems during the ICC (Rome Statute) negotiations. Ware has served as Vice-President of International Peace Bureau, a Nobel Peace Laureate organisation working for peace, war prevention and disarmament for development.

== Non-violence – prevention of violence against women and children ==
Ware educates and campaigns in support of non-violence and the rights of women and children, including the right to be free from sexual, physical or emotional violence.

He was board member of Safety Inc: The Clothesline Project (New York) from 1994 to 1999, is active in White Ribbon Day and has served on the advisory board of Kids Rights International. He was New Zealand Coordinator for the World March for Peace and Nonviolence (2009) and has served on the International Board of Peace Brigades International, which uses non-violent accompaniment to protect human rights advocates in civil conflicts. He also helped establish the Global Nonviolent Peaceforce.

== Indigenous Rights and anti-racism ==
Ware is active in anti-racism and indigenous rights movements in New Zealand and internationally, including in the issues of nuclear weapons and energy issues.

He was a non-violence trainer for the anti-Springbok Tour protests (1981), was a member of Project Waitangi (an anti-racism education program), was active in the campaign to secure support from New Zealand for the Declaration on the Rights of Indigenous Peoples and has served as an adviser to the American Indian Law Alliance on international legal remedies for violation of treaties between States and Indigenous nations. Ware's daughter is indigenous.

== Environment and animal rights ==
Ware is a member of the World Future Council – a group of 50 eminent people advancing exemplary policy to protect the environment for future generations. Since 1980 he has been vegetarian, citing concerns for animal rights and the environment for his decision.

== Sports and peace ==
Ware was a member of the 2011 Peace and Sport New York marathon team, which also included Tegla Loroupe (the first African woman to win the NY marathon) and Wilson Kipketer (triple 800m world Champion). He runs a Peace and Sport program for the Basel Peace Office at the University of Basel.

== See also ==
- List of peace activists
