= Lemcke =

Lemcke is a German language surname from the personal name Lambrecht. Notable people with the name include:

- Andreas Lemcke (1959), German speed skater
- Carl von Lemcke (1831–1913), German aesthetician and art historian
- Christian Lemcke (1850–1894), German otolaryngologist
- Julius Augustus Lemcke (1832–1911), State Treasurer of Indiana
- Ludwig Lemcke (1816–1884), German Romance philologist and literary historian
- Walter Lemcke (1891–1955), German sculptor

== See also ==
- Lemke (surname)
