= Madres de Ituzaingó =

Argentinian environmental and human rights group

- Madres de Ituzaingó
- Formation: 2001
- Type: Environmental justice and human rights organization
- Headquarters: Córdoba, Argentina

Madres de Ituzaingó (lit. Mothers of Ituzaingo) is an environmental justice and human rights organization formed in the city of Córdoba, Argentina. The organization is known for questioning the health effects of agro-industrial production, particularly soybean cultivation in Argentina and the use of pesticides. The group takes its name from the Ituzaingó Anexo neighbourhood, where the environmental conflict developed.

== Origins ==
Ituzaingó Anexo is a peripheral neighbourhood of the city of Córdoba. It is located on the south-eastern edge of the city, in an industrial area near rural zones, outside the ring road (Avenida de Circunvalación), between National Route 9 and the Córdoba-Pilar motorway. It was initially conceived as a neighbourhood for industrial workers, following the establishment of a Fiat plant there in the 1950s.

In late 2001, a group of mothers from Ituzaingó Anexo began to notice an increase in the number of residents suffering from and dying of cancer or other illnesses. This prompted them to conduct a community mapping of diseases experienced by neighbourhood residents, including cancer, allergies, birth defects, miscarriages, among others. The community survey primarily recorded the various illnesses affecting residents. During this study, they discovered that most cases were located near the agricultural areas surrounding the neighbourhood.

However, the causes of these illnesses were initially unknown. At first, the group associated them with the lack of potable water, which formed part of longstanding demands to improve infrastructure and sanitation conditions in the neighbourhood. The group began organising protests and activities to attract the attention of residents and authorities, demanding intervention by the Ministry of Health. In the context of these protests, and needing to identify themselves to the media covering the demonstrations, they adopted the name “Madres de Ituzaingó”.

The members later established contact with Raúl Montenegro an Argentine biologist and founder of the Foundation for the Defence of the Environment (FUNAM), an environmental organisation based in Córdoba. Through this collaboration, it was determined that soils near the neighbourhood contained high concentrations of pesticides and herbicides, including substances such as endosulfan. The contamination levels detected were significantly above permitted limits, and in mid-2002 the health authorities declared Ituzaingó Anexo to be in a “health emergency”.

Relations with provincial and municipal authorities were consistently tense. Initially, authorities denied and challenged the evidence presented by the mothers and their allies, and subsequently sought to prevent further production of such evidence. Restrictions were enacted to prohibit aerial spraying of pesticides, but regulations continued to go unenforced. The lack of response from municipal, provincial and national authorities compelled the Madres to seek alliances beyond the neighbourhood, giving rise to the campaign “Paren de fumigar” (“Stop the Spraying”).

In addition to protests, the Madres pursued legal action. The first trial took place in 2012, resulting in a ruling in favour of the Madres, which recognised spraying as a criminal offence. However, those convicted received non-custodial sentences. In 2020, during a second trial, the sole defendant was acquitted, despite the evidence presented in the case.

=== Founders ===
Among the founders are Sofia Gatica, Marcela Ferreyra, Norma Herrera, Vita Ayllon, Julia Lindon and María Godoy.
