= Phuon Keoraksmey =

Cambodian activist

Phuon Keoraksmey (born 2001) is a Cambodian environmental activist and part of the youth-led environmental group Mother Nature Cambodia, who has campaigned against environmentally destructive infrastructure projects and alleged corruption in Cambodia. On July 2, 2024, she was sentenced to 6 years in prison on charges of plotting and insulting the king, in what Amnesty International described as a "crushing blow to Cambodia's civil society."

== Activism and legal issues ==
On September 3, 2020, Phuong Keoraksmey was arrested by Phnom Penh police after co-organising a one-woman walk to the residence of Cambodian Prime Minister Hun Sen as part of a campaign opposing the planned privatisation and reclamation of Phnom Penh's largest lake, Boeung Tamok. According to co-founder of Mother Nature, Alejandro Gonzales-Davidson, the arrest took place hours before the planned three kilometer walk of Long Kunthea towards the Prime Minister's residence, with Keoreaksmey joining to record and livestream the solo walk. Along with her co-organisers, she was sentenced to 18 months in jail and fined 4 million riels ($1,000) after being found guilty of "incitement to commit a felony or disturb social order."

In November 2023, a court in Cambodia ruled that Keoreaksmey would be denied permission to travel to Stockholm to accept Mother Nature Cambodia's Right Livelihood Award.

On July 2, 2024, Keoraksmey was sentenced to 6 years in jail along with nine other members of Mother Nature on charges of plotting and insulting the king, related to Mother Nature's activism between 2012 and 2021. In the hours prior to her arrest, she and three others led a peaceful march dressed in white clothing, choosing not to attend the verdict hearing itself.
