= Freda Huson =

Indigenous rights activist

Freda Huson (born May 24, 1964, Smithers, British Columbia), Chief Howilhkat of the Wet’suwet’en First Nation in Canada, is an Indigenous rights activist for the Wet'suwet'en people. She is wing-chief of the Wet’suwet’en's Dark House Clan. Huson established the Uni’stot’en healing camp on the land that became the federally recognized territory of the Wet’suwet’en Nation. She is a leader in the opposition against the construction of pipelines. Since 2010, she has lived on her ancestral lands in Talbeetskwa in British Columbia with her children.

== Personal life ==
Huson was born in Smithers, British Columbia in 1964.

She was married to Toghestiy (Warner Naziel), Chief Smogelgem, Hereditary Chief of the sovereign Likhts’amsyu people, whom she has children with.

== Activism ==
=== Unist’ot’en camp ===
In 2010, Huson became the coordinator of the Unist’ot’en camp, moving there to live full-time. The Unist’ot’en camp is a center aimed at helping Indigenous people to heal from trauma by reconnecting with the land. The center also hosts women's groups, cultural workshops and a language school. The camp has a main building with an industrial kitchen, bedrooms, game room, meeting rooms and an art space. There is also a smokehouse and other small houses

The camp was partly created to assert land rights and oppose seven proposed pipelines which were planned to cross through Wet’suwet’en territory and their main water source the Morice River. Out of the seven proposed pipelines, five have been defeated. As the Coastal Gaslink pipeline has begun construction, The Unist’ot’en camp has become a gathering place for opposition to this pipeline.

The famous Standing Rock standoff over the Dakota Access pipeline was partly inspired by the Unist’ot’en clan of Northern British Columbia who have been reoccupying their territory to reassert their land rights. Huson is a proponent that these action camps can be a place of healing, although she acknowledges that many Indigenous activists suffer from burnout due to the numerous proposed extractive projects in their region and many are already occupied with other Indigenous issues like dealing with intergenerational trauma.

=== Wet’suwet’en land defense ===
Freda Huson presented on April 24, 2019, to address human rights violations with the United Nations Permanent Forum on Indigenous Issues. Huson expressed the explicit and apparent depletion of natural resources including animals, salmon, and water. The Wet’suwet’en territory hereditary chiefs have not imparted consent to the pipeline and have since faced court injunctions from the Coastal GasLink pipeline. There has been continuous resistance of Canadian jurisdiction within the Wet’suwet’en territory led by Freda Huson.

=== Arrest and activism against Coastal Gaslink ===
Freda Huson was forcibly removed by a convoy of armed Royal Canadian Mounted Police on Monday February 10, 2020. Freda Huson (Chief Howihkat), Brenda Michell (Chief Geltiy), and Karla Tait were holding a ceremony for missing and murdered Indigenous women at the moment of the arrest. This ceremony was held in response to the coastal Gaslink project in British Columbia. Red dresses were hung as a sign of lost or murdered Indigenous women and girls, the dresses were taken down by the RCMP and several activists were arrested.

Freda was featured in the 2024 documentary Yintah.

== Awards and nominations ==
In 2021, Huson was awarded the Right Livelihood Award for her work in reclaiming the culture of her people and protecting their land against natural resource development projects such as gas pipelines. She was chosen among 209 nominations in 89 countries along with Marthe Wandou and Vladimir Slivyak. The Right Livelihood Award was established in 1980, it is often referred to as an alternative Nobel Prize.
