= Geneva Consensus Declaration =

Anti-abortion declaration

Geneva Consensus Declaration on Promoting Women’s Health and Strengthening the Family
- Signed: December 2, 2020
- Signatories: List: Algeria; Argentina; Bahrain; Belarus; Benin; Burkina Faso; Burundi; Cameroon; Central African Republic; Chad; Congo; Democratic Republic of the Congo; Djibouti; Dominican Republic; Egypt; Eswatini; Gambia; Georgia; Guatemala; Guinea; Haiti; Honduras; Hungary; Indonesia; Iraq; Kazakhstan; Kenya; Kuwait; Libya; Mauritania; Nauru; Niger; Oman; Pakistan; Paraguay; Qatar; Russia; Saudi Arabia; Senegal; South Sudan; Sudan; Trinidad and Tobago; Uganda; United Arab Emirates; United States; Zambia
- Depositaries: United States Department of Health and Human Services (Office on Women's Health)
- Language: English

The Geneva Consensus Declaration on Promoting Women's Health and Strengthening the Family is an anti-abortion, women's health and development, and family defense international document created in 2020 and signed at that time by about 30 governments. "The declaration’s four main principles are “to secure meaningful health and development gains for women; to protect life at all stages; to defend the family as the fundamental unit of society; and to work together across the UN system to realize these values.” There are 46 signatories as of October 2026.

It was initially cosponsored in 2020 by Brazil, Egypt, Hungary, Indonesia, Uganda, and the United States. Brazil eventually withdrew from the document and Guatemala was added as a cosponsor. Representatives from 34 countries signed the document on October 22, 2020. Burundi and Chad are among the most recent signatories. In 2021, Russia joined the Geneva Consensus. In August 2026, Argentina signed the declaration under President Javier Milei, becoming the first country to join after the United States assumed the secretariat from Hungary in June 2026.

== Document and history ==
Initiated by U.S. Secretary of State Mike Pompeo, the document is not related to the United Nations' Geneva Consensus Foundation or to other Geneva-based institutions and was not signed in Geneva due to COVID-19 restrictions. Described as "Pompeo's project", the declaration was submitted by U.S. ambassador Kelly Craft to the UN General Assembly under agenda item 131 for December 2020. While reaffirming the vital role women play in families and pregnancy, it also supports women’s rights and participation in political affairs and prioritizes “equal access to quality education, economic resources, and political participation as well as equal opportunities with men and boys for employment, leadership and decision-making at all levels.” Protection for the inherent value of every human life, the family unit, “complete physical, mental and social well-being,” and holistic, specialized healthcare key components of the document.

A commitment to prevent access to abortion, where that is the position of a nation's law, is central to the declaration. The persons signing the statement "[r]eaffirm [inter alia] that there is no international right to abortion, nor any international obligation on the part of States to finance or facilitate abortion, consistent with the long-standing international consensus that each nation has the sovereign right to implement programs and activities consistent with their laws and policies ... ." Rather, the Declaration specifies the United Nations should therefore respect national laws and policies on abortion.

== Withdrawals ==
On January 28, 2021, U.S. president Joe Biden removed the United States from the declaration. President Biden continued to encourage other states, such as Burkina Faso and Benin, to withdraw as well. These nations permit abortion only in certain circumstances.

On January 24, 2025, Marco Rubio announced the United States' intention under the second presidency of Donald Trump to rejoin the Geneva Consensus Declaration. On January 27, Dorothy Fink, Acting Secretary of the U.S. Department of Health and Human Services, announced that the U.S. had rejoined the declaration.

The declaration was signed by Iván Duque of Colombia, but was withdrawn by Gustavo Petro shortly after taking office as president. On January 17, 2023, Brazil president Lula da Silva removed Brazil from the declaration.

== Original signatories ==
The declaration was signed by unspecified "ministers and high representatives of Governments" from the Bahrain, Belarus, Benin, Brazil, Burkina Faso, Cameroon, Democratic Republic of the Congo, Republic of the Congo, Djibouti, Egypt, Eswatini, The Gambia, Georgia, Haiti, Hungary, Indonesia, Iraq, Kenya, Kuwait, Libya, Nauru, Niger, Oman, Pakistan, Paraguay, Poland, Saudi Arabia, Senegal, South Sudan, Sudan, Uganda, United Arab Emirates, United States, and Zambia. As the signatories were unspecified, there is no evidence that the signatories were empowered to bind any country.

Most of the signatories are among the 20 worst countries to be a woman according to Georgetown University's Women, Peace and Security Index. With the exception of the United Arab Emirates (ranked 20th), none of the top twenty countries on the index signed.

== Members ==
- Algeria
- Argentina
- Bahrain
- Belarus
- Benin
- Burkina Faso
- Burundi
- Cameroon
- Central African Republic
- Chad
- Congo
- Colombia
- Democratic Republic of the Congo
- Djibouti
- Dominican Republic
- Egypt
- Eswatini
- Gambia
- Georgia
- Guatemala
- Guinea
- Haiti
- Honduras
- Hungary
- Indonesia
- Iraq
- Kazakhstan
- Kenya
- Kuwait
- Libya
- Mauritania
- Nauru
- Niger
- Oman
- Pakistan
- Paraguay
- Qatar
- Russia
- Saudi Arabia
- Senegal
- South Sudan
- Sudan
- Trinidad and Tobago
- Uganda
- United Arab Emirates
- United States
- Zambia

=== Former Members ===
- Brazil
- Poland

== Criticism ==
Pro abortion rights groups were critical of the declaration. Egyptian NGO Nazra for Feminist Studies described the declaration as "an international attack on women, gender, and sexuality", and Amnesty International USA said the signatories were "willingly endangering people's health and lives". Critics have accused the signatories of being motivated by a desire to undermine established international institutions, though the document's stated purpose emphasizes the preservation of national sovereignty in deciding a state's own public health policies.

Many note that most of the signatories come from illiberal, authoritarian, or autocratic governments.

== See also ==
- Commission on Unalienable Rights
- Foreign policy of the first Donald Trump administration
- Foreign policy of the Joe Biden administration
- Foreign policy of the second Donald Trump administration
- Mexico City Policy
