= S. M. Mohamed Idris =

Malaysian activist (1926–2019)

S.M. Mohamed Idris (6 December 1926 – 17 May 2019) was a Malaysian advocate of consumer rights, environmental protection, and worker's rights. He was the longtime president of two grassroots organisations, Sahabat Alam Malaysia (SAM) and the Consumers Association of Penang (CAP). His death in May 2019 was observed by numerous NGO, governmental, and social leaders of Malaysia.

He was noted for being part of the pressure group that led to the establishment of the Department of Environment in 1975, the banning of toxic drugs, the printing of expiry dates on all food products, limiting cigarette advertisements, championing workers' benefits under the Social Security Organisation and Employees Provident Fund, and improving the legal standing for tenants and house buyers.

His work was guided by the principles of protecting consumers against bad business practices.
