= Mudhalvar Mahatma =

2012 Indian film by A. Balakrishnan

- DVD cover
- Directed by: A. Balakrishnan
- Written by: A. Balakrishnan
- Starring: A. Kanagaraj; Anupam Kher; Krishnammal Jagannathan; V. S. Raghavan
- Cinematography: J. Mohan; Subu
- Edited by: V. T. Vijayan
- Music by: Illayaraja
- Distributed by: Ramana Communications
- Release date: 30 January 2012
- Running time: 105 minutes
- Country: India
- Language: Tamil

Mudhalvar Mahatma is a 2012 Indian Tamil-language biographical film directed by A. Balakrishnan. The film, released on 30 January 2012 in India, stars S. Kanagaraj as Mohandas Gandhi. The movie's music was written by Ilaiyaraaja, with lyrics by Bharat Acharya, and the movie's plot explores how Gandhi might react if he was still alive and visited modern day India. The film was dubbed in Hindi as Welcome Back Gandhi.

Filming for Mudhalvar Mahatma took place over a 40-day period in Chennai during 2012, and was produced on a budget of ₹3 crore.

== Plot ==
After a 60-year absence, Gandhi (S. Kanagaraj) returns to India to resume his Satyagraha Movement. While there, he must deal with the various social, economical and political issues that exist within the country.

== Cast ==
- S. Kanagaraj as Mahatma Gandhi
- Anupam Kher as the Chief Minister of a State in India
  - Sundar as the younger version
- Manvi Gagroo
- V. S. Raghavan
- S. Sathyendra
- Deenadhayalan
- Krishnammal Jagannathan

== Soundtrack ==
The music was composed by Ilaiyaraaja and features a promotional song in Hindi titled "Ekla Chalo Re" by Vaikom Vijayalakshmi.

== Reception ==
The Hindu gave a positive review for Mudhalvar Mahatma, commenting that "It's a noble, valiant effort that needs to be seen and promoted just so that another filmmaker is encouraged to invest in a film as honest as this, one that will invoke and appeal to the patriot in you, despite its idealistic failings."

== See also ==
- List of artistic depictions of Mahatma Gandhi
