= Negussie =

Negussie (also Negusse, Negusie or Nigussie), meaning "King of", is a name of Ethiopian origin that may refer to:

- Hailu Negussie (born 1978), Ethiopian marathon runner and 2005 Boston Marathon winner
- Abebech Negussie (born 1983), Ethiopian middle-distance runner
- Andualem Negusse (born 1985), Ethiopian footballer
- Yetnebersh Nigussie (born 1982), Ethiopian lawyer and disability rights activist

== See also ==
- Negusie v. Holder, 2009 legal case at the United States Supreme Court regarding asylum
