= Meenakshi Raman =

Malaysian environmentalist

Meenakshi Raman (born 1958) is a Malaysian environmentalist and the current president of Sahabat Alam Malaysia.

Born in Seremban, Negeri Sembilan in 1958, she is also a public interest lawyer and was among those detained under Ops Lalang in 1987 where she spent 47 days in solitary confinement.

In her capacity as the Sahabat Alam President, she spoke about various environmentalist issues in Malaysia such as the Penang South Island, rare mining in Bukit Enggang Kedah, river pollution in Klang Valley and more.

In 2018, she was the Tanjung Bungah Residents Association chairperson where she urged the Attorney-General's Chambers (AGC) to review the fines implicated in the October 2017 landslide tragedy which led to the deaths of 11 lives.

Free Malaysia Today described her as the "Erin Brokovich of Malaysia" for her work in championing public issues.
