= Legesse =

Legesse is a male given name of Ethiopian origin. Notable people with the name include:

- Legesse Wolde-Yohannes, Ethiopian horticultural scientist
- Meskerem Legesse (1986–2013), Ethiopian female middle-distance runner at the 2004 Olympics
- Meskerem Assefa Legesse (born 1985), Ethiopian female middle-distance runner at the 2008 Olympics
