= Lottie Cunningham Wren =

Indigenous Nicaraguan lawyer

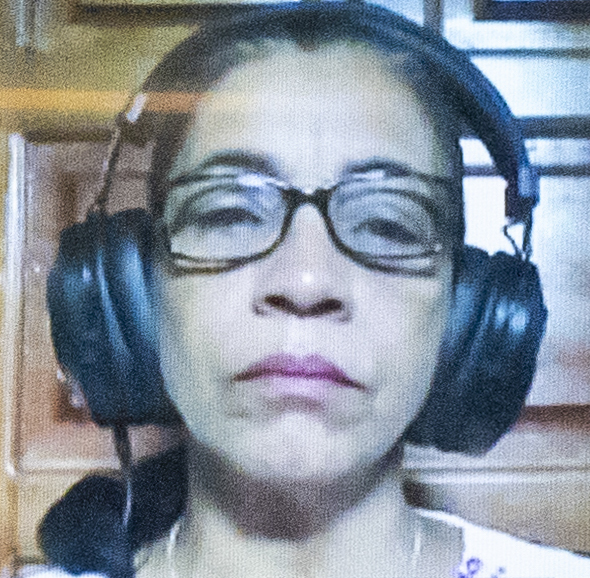
- Lottie Cunningham Wren in 2021
- Born: September 29, 1959 (age 65); Bilwaskarma, Nicaragua
- Occupation: Indigenous rights lawyer
- Organization(s): Center for Justice and Human Rights of the Atlantic Coast of Nicaragua
- Awards: Right Livelihood Award (2020)
- Website: cejudhcan.wixsite.com/cejudhcan

Lottie Cunningham Wren (born 1959) is a Miskito Nicaraguan lawyer, environmentalist, and Indigenous rights activist from Nicaragua.

Cunningham was born on September 29, 1959, in the village of Bilwaskarma, located on the Rio Coco, Nicaragua.

Cunningham founded the Center for Justice and Human Rights of the Atlantic Coast of Nicaragua. In 2019 she received the Paul K. Feyerabend Award, and in 2020 she received the Right Livelihood Award, also known as the "Alternative Nobel Prize," for her work defending the rights of Indigenous and Afro-descendant peoples to their land.
