= Aklilu Lemma =

Ethiopian pathologist (1935–1997)

- አክሊሉ ለማ
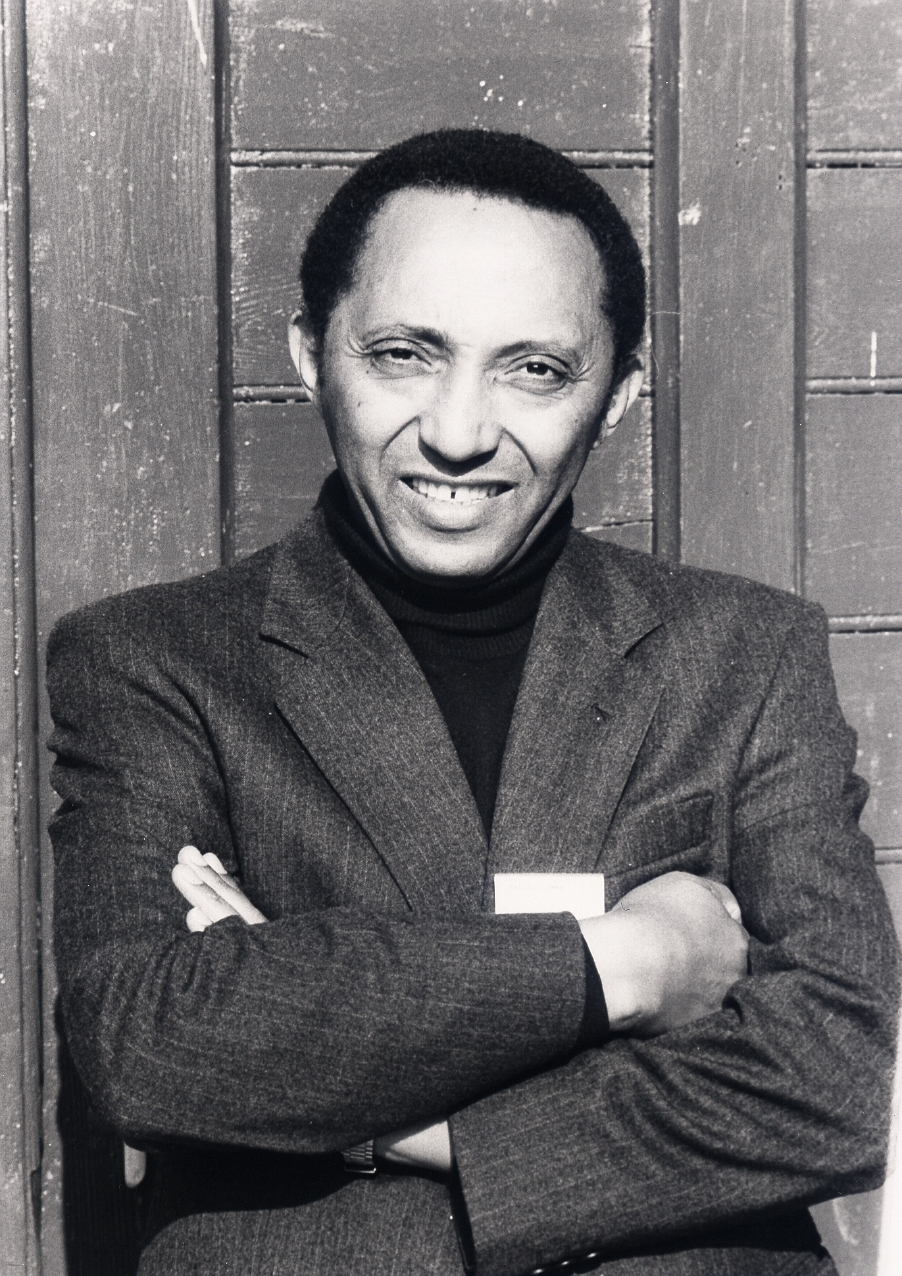
- Born: 18 September 1935; Jijiga, Hararghe Province, Ethiopian Empire (now Somali Region, Ethiopia)
- Died: 5 April 1997 (aged 61); United States
- Education: Addis Ababa National University; Johns Hopkins University
- Awards: Right Livelihood Award
- Scientific career
- Fields: Pathology
- Workplaces: Haile Selassie I University Institute of Pathobiology; United Nations; Johns Hopkins University

Aklilu Lemma (Amharic: አክሊሉ ለማ; 18 September 1935 – 5 April 1997) was an Ethiopian pathologist. In 1989, he was awarded the Right Livelihood Award "for discovering and campaigning relentlessly for an affordable preventative against bilharzia." He made his most important scientific discovery very early in his career in 1964 when he discovered a natural environmental control agent for schistosomiasis, also known as snail fever or bilharzia. He found that berries from the endod plant, which are commonly used to make soap and shampoos in many parts of Africa, are a potent, inexpensive and safe molluscicide, to prevent the spread of the parasitic worm via infected aquatic snails. This discovery made the plant an object of scientific research in many parts of the world.

== Education ==
Lemma was educated at Addis Ababa University College, Northwestern University, University of Wisconsin Madison and at Johns Hopkins University in the U.S. where he obtained his D.Sc. in 1964. His dissertation was on sandfly-borne leishmaniasis.

== Career ==
Following his doctorate, Lemma returned to his home country, Ethiopia, where he obtained a position at the then Haile Selassie I University. He founded the Institute of Pathobiology, now known as the Aklilu Lemma Institute of Pathobiology, and taught there until 1976, when he left it for a job in the United Nations. He served the UN in many capacities as a scientist, became the Deputy Director of UNICEF's International Child Development Centre, now known as UNICEF's Innocenti Research Centre and finally obtained a position in his alma mater, Johns Hopkins University.

He made his most important scientific discovery very early in his career, in 1964, when he discovered a natural environmental preventive agent against schistosomiasis, also known as snail fever disease or bilharzia, a debilitating disease caused by parasitic worms of genus Schistosoma spread by freshwater snails. He found that berries from the endod plant, which is commonly used to make soap and shampoos in many parts of Africa, is a potent, inexpensive and safe molluscicide, to prevent the spread of parasitic worms by reducing host snail populations. This discovery made the plant an object of scientific research in many parts of the world. Lemma himself was at the forefront of this research. His work acquired an international reputation, which in turn led to various awards, including honorary doctorate degrees. The most prestigious award was the one he won together with his research associate, Dr. Legesse Wolde-Yohannes in November 1989 – the Right Livelihood Award of Sweden, commonly referred to as the Alternative Nobel Prize.

He died in the United States on 5 April 1997 and was buried in Ethiopia, on 13 April.

== Awards and distinctions ==
- Right Livelihood Award (1989)
