= Serb Civic Council =

Nongovernmental organization

The Serb Civic Council (Serbian: Српско грађанско вијеће, romanized: Srpsko građansko vijeće, SGV) is a non-governmental organization based in Sarajevo, Bosnia and Herzegovina.

It was created in March 1994 during the Bosnian War by Bosnian Serbs loyal to the Republic of Bosnia and Herzegovina who thereby rejected Republika Srpska. The SGV grew to an estimated 50,000 members and 20 offices. Among its founding leaders were wartime Republic of Bosnia and Herzegovina Presidency member Mirko Pejanović, University of Sarajevo professor Ljubo Berberović, Oslobođenje journalist Rajko Živković, and lawyer Žarko Bulić.

== History ==
Following its establishment the SGV set out the following principles:

- preservation of a democratic, internationally-recognized, and sovereign Bosnia and Herzegovina;
- equality of all the citizens of Bosnia and Herzegovina, with full guarantee of civic freedoms and human rights in line with the highest international standards;
- full implementation of the right of all displaced and expelled citizens to return to their homes;
- punishment of all war criminals.

In 1995, the SGV was awarded the Right Livelihood Award "for maintaining their support for a humane, multi-ethnic, democratic Bosnia-Herzegovina."

=== 2000s ===
On 26 December 2002, the SGV received death threats from a Belgrade-based group calling itself "Gavrilo Princip" (assassin of Archduke Franz Ferdinand of Austria). The group is believed to be a branch of the Chetnik Ravna Gora Movement. Mirko Pejanović, President of the SCC later met with the High Representative, Wolfgang Petritsch, in Sarajevo. The discussion included the implementation of the Constitutional Court's decision on the constituency of Bosnia and Herzegovina's people, return, and the threats made against the SCC members and their families.

At some point during the 2000s, the SGV modified its full name to Srpsko građansko vijeće - Pokret za ravnopravnost (Serb Civic Council - Movement for Equality).

=== 2010s ===
In July 2011, four months following the arrest of the retired Army of the Republic of Bosnia and Herzegovina (ARBiH) general Jovan Divjak in Vienna by the Austrian Bundespolizei according to the Serbia-issued Interpol-wide war crimes warranted over Divjak's command responsibility for the deadly May 1992 Yugoslav People's Army column incident in the Dobrovoljačka Street in Sarajevo, the SGV along with three other Sarajevo-based NGOs, Croat National Council (HNV), Congress of Bosniak Intellectuals Council (VKBI), and Krug 99, put out a joint press release, calling for Divjak to be released because "the warrant from Serbia isn't based on legally norms, but only designed for propaganda effect", while SGV member Sretko Tomašević added: "We know they [Serbia] have no moral compass and we know they're a product of the activity of the Greater Serbia ideologues, so now even Jovan Dovjak, an ethnic Serb who served in the ARBiH, has found himself a target of that country [Serbia]".

The following day, SGV was criticized by Staša Košarac, the Republika Srpska Coordination Team for the Investigation of War Crimes and Missing Civilians chief, who said: "The SGV has absolutely no legitimacy to speak on the behalf of Serbs. Furthermore, it has no right to even call itself 'Serb' because SGV is a group of people gathered around Mirko Pejanović who spent the entire Bosnian War in the service of Alija Izetbegović as well as the Bosniak military and political leadership. Over the 16 years of their existence, they never uttered a single word about the crimes committed against the Sarajevo Serbs, let alone speak against those atrocities".
