= Lemke (surname) =

Lemke is a German surname.

== Geographical distribution ==
As of 2014, 59.6% of all known bearers of the surname Lemke were residents of Germany (frequency 1:2,598), 27.7% of the United States (1:3,061,452), 4.6% of Brazil (1:86,475), 2.1% of Canada (1:33,211) and 2.1% of Poland (1:34,335).

In Germany, the frequency of the surname was higher than national average (1:2,598) in the following states:

1. Mecklenburg-Vorpommern (1:599)
2. Brandenburg (1:837)
3. Schleswig-Holstein (1:969)
4. Berlin (1:1,102)
5. Bremen (1:1,445)
6. Hamburg (1:1,642)
7. Lower Saxony (1:1,716)
8. Saxony-Anhalt (1:1,977)

== People ==
- Anthony Lemke (born 1970), Canadian actor
- Birsel Lemke (born 1950), Turkish environmentalist
- Carlton E. Lemke (1920–2004), American mathematician
- Derek Lemke (born 1993), American racing driver
- Helmut Lemke (1907–1990), German politician
- James Lemke (born 1988), Australian professional tennis player
- James U Lemke (1929–2019), American physicist and entrepreneur
- Jay Lemke (born 1946), American education scientist
- Klaus Lemke (1940–2022), German film director
- LeRoy Lemke (1935–1991), American lawyer and politician
- Leslie Lemke (born 1952), American musical savant
- Lev Lemke (1931–1996), Russian actor
- Mark Lemke (born 1965), baseball player
- Peter Henry Lemke (1796–1882), German Benedictine
- Richard R. Lemke (1930–2016), American farmer and politician
- Siegfried Lemke (1921–1995), German World War II Luftwaffe ace
- Steffi Lemke (born 1968), German politician
- Steve Lemke, American guitar player
- Thorsten Lemke, developer of GraphicConverter for macOS, owner of LemkeSoft
- Wilfried Lemke (1946–2024), German football manager
- William Lemke (1878–1950), American politician
- Wolf Lemke (1938–2018), German aircraft designer
- Dave Lemke, original bass player of Imagine Dragons
- Egon Albrecht-Lemke, German-Brazilian Luftwaffe fighter
