= Parliamentarians for Nuclear Non-Proliferation and Disarmament =

Parliamentarians for Nuclear Non-Proliferation and Disarmament (PNND) is a non-profit, non-partisan global network of parliamentarians committed to eliminating nuclear threats and advancing disarmament worldwide. As an influential coalition spanning state, federal, and regional legislatures, PNND unites legislators from diverse political backgrounds to champion nuclear non-proliferation and disarmament policies. Through strategic advocacy, legislative action, and high-level diplomatic engagement, PNND works to make meaningful progress toward a safer, nuclear-free world.

PNND aims to serve as a bridge between national governments and global disarmament initiatives, fostering international cooperation and facilitating dialogue between policymakers, experts, and civil society. Its members introduce resolutions, shape legislative frameworks, and advocate for strong commitments to nuclear risk reduction.

With its headquarters in Geneva, Switzerland, and regional offices in key geopolitical areas, the PNND coordinates efforts across various legislative bodies. By collaborating with international organizations, think tanks, and grassroots movements, the PNND works to amplify its impact, equipping parliamentarians with the tools and knowledge necessary to advance nuclear disarmament within their respective governments and on the world stage.

== History ==
=== 2000 to 2002 ===
PNND was established in 2000 as a sub-committee of Parliamentarians for Global Action (PGA), supported by the Middle Powers Initiative (MPI). In its founding year, PNND members successfully introduced parliamentary resolutions supporting the Treaty on the Non-Proliferation of Nuclear Weapons (NPT) in Australia, Belgium, Canada, Germany, and New Zealand. They also actively participated in the NPT Review Conference, advocating for concrete disarmament measures in the final NPT document.

In 2001, PNND became an independent program under MPI, launching a website, briefing book, and promotional materials. During this period, PNND focused on raising awareness about the risks of nuclear terrorism, primarily through advocacy and policy recommendations rather than direct legislative action.

By 2002, both PNND and MPI transitioned into programs under the Global Security Institute (GSI), a US-based organization dedicated to fostering international cooperation through legal frameworks. As PNND expanded internationally, it established cross-party sections in Japan and New Zealand, increasing its membership to 100 parliamentarians from 30 countries. Members prioritized pressing security issues, including the South Asian nuclear crisis, urging India and Pakistan to exercise restraint following attacks in Kashmir. The organization's commitment to the rule of law was grounded in internationally recognized legal frameworks, such as the Geneva Conventions and UN disarmament agreements, rather than solely reflecting US policy perspectives.

=== 2003 to 2006 ===
In 2003, PNND actively advocated for diplomatic solutions to address concerns over Iraq’s suspected weapons of mass destruction, North Korea’s withdrawal from the NPT, and UNGA disarmament resolutions. To promote peaceful alternatives, PNND facilitated parliamentary discussions and international forums, including a roundtable for Indian Members of Parliament in New Delhi and the 2nd Nagasaki Global Citizens’ Assembly for the Elimination of Nuclear Weapons. The organization also hosted the “From Nuclear Dangers to Cooperative Security” forum in Vancouver, bringing together policymakers to explore diplomatic and cooperative security measures. Additionally, PNND participated in the NPT Preparatory Committee Meeting in Geneva, emphasizing parliamentary engagement in non-proliferation and disarmament efforts. These initiatives aimed to foster dialogue among lawmakers, experts, and civil society, advocating for negotiation-based approaches over military action.

PNND’s 2004 activities ranged from participating in the United Nations Security Council Resolution 1540 discussions to hosting a roundtable at the NPT Preparatory Committee. That year, PNND established cross-party sections in Canada, contributing to Canada’s decision to opt out of the US Missile Defense System. Additionally, PNND and Mayors for Peace co-launched the International Mayors’ and Parliamentarians’ Appeal for a Nuclear Weapons-Free World, hosted the “Parliamentarians, Mayors and Nuclear Non-Proliferation” roundtable at the NPT Preparatory Committee Conference, and held an international conference in Wellington.

By 2005, PNND had expanded its network, establishing cross-party sections in South Korea and Belgium. PNND cross-sections in NATO countries actively advocated for the withdrawal of tactical nuclear weapons from Europe, leading to resolutions in Belgium and an appeal signed by PNND members from all NATO nuclear-sharing countries. PNND also organized the Civil Society Forum at the First Conference of States Parties to NWFZs in Mexico and presented the Mayors’ and Parliamentarians’ Appeal at the United Nations. In Japan, PNND achieved the adoption of a parliamentary resolution on nuclear abolition.

In 2006, PNND coordinated an international parliamentary letter opposing the India-US nuclear deal and launched campaigns regarding the UK’s plans to replace its Trident nuclear weapons system. PNND also advocated for multilateral diplomacy in addressing the nuclear fuel dispute with Iran. Members participated in the Article VI Forum, promoting the NPT’s disarmament obligations, and joined the Nobel Peace Laureates Summit in South Korea, supporting disarmament appeals for Northeast Asia.

=== 2007 to 2011 ===
By 2007, PNND had reached 500 members from over 70 countries, with outreach materials available in 18 languages. A PNND cross-party section was formed in the European Parliament, leading to a call for a nuclear weapons-free world at the earliest possible date. In the United States, supermodel Christie Brinkley joined PNND at the United Nations to speak on nuclear abolition. In Israel, PNND members proposed curtailing nuclear fuel cycle facilities, including the closure of Dimona. PNND also promoted Securing Our Survival, a publication advocating for a Nuclear Weapons Convention.

In 2008, PNND continued expanding its international influence, particularly in southern Africa, where PNND members facilitated government ratification of the Pelindaba Treaty, aimed at establishing a nuclear weapon-free zone in Africa. PNND Co-Presidents also released a statement on International Women’s Day for Disarmament, calling for global action on peace, disarmament, and the reallocation of military budgets to social programs. Additionally, PNND organized a seminar at the NATO Parliamentary Assembly in Berlin, urging NATO to abandon nuclear deterrence and remove nuclear weapons from Europe.

That same year, PNND partnered with Pugwash Peace Exchange to host an international conference at Thinkers' Lodge in Pugwash, Nova Scotia, where parliamentarians and disarmament experts developed strategies to advance nuclear disarmament and the abolition of nuclear weapons.

In 2011, Zimbabwean politician and human rights lawyer David Coltart was appointed as a Co-President of PNND. His leadership in the organization aligned with his broader advocacy for peace, democracy, and responsible governance. As Co-President, Coltart highlighted the global economic burden of nuclear weapons, noting that approximately $100 billion is spent annually on nuclear arsenals. He has argued that these funds could be more effectively allocated toward critical sectors such as education, healthcare, and social development. His stance reflects PNND’s mission to redirect military expenditures toward initiatives that promote human well-being and sustainable global security.

== Mission and objectives ==
Central to PNND’s mission are several key focus areas, reflecting its commitment to non-proliferation and the elimination of nuclear arsenals. These priorities include ending nuclear testing, preventing the proliferation of nuclear technology and materials, and establishing new nuclear-weapon-free zones worldwide. PNND actively supports these objectives through various diplomatic efforts. For example, it co-hosted the 2009 UN Diplomatic Roundtable on a Nuclear Weapons Convention, which brought together policymakers to discuss pathways to global disarmament. It has also played a role in strengthening Nuclear-Weapon-Free Zones (NWFZs), such as by organizing the 2005 Nuclear Weapon Free Zone Conference in Mexico, where 108 states coordinated efforts to expand these zones.

Additionally, PNND has advocated for reallocating national nuclear budgets toward social and economic development. A key initiative was the 2006 PNND/Mayors for Peace Joint Statement on NPT, which called for redirecting military expenditures toward global development goals. At the parliamentary level, PNND has pushed for legislative actions, such as the European Parliament’s resolution on the NPT in 2005, reinforcing political commitments to disarmament.

These initiatives demonstrate PNND’s multi-level diplomatic engagement—bringing together parliamentarians, governments, and civil society to drive meaningful action toward nuclear disarmament.

To advance its goals, PNND members engage in legislative action, public advocacy, and diplomacy. They introduce resolutions, motions, and parliamentary debates, and organize events to build support for disarmament. In Australia, PNND members have been actively involved in advocating for the Comprehensive Nuclear-Test-Ban Treaty (CTBT). For instance, during the 2005 Conference on Facilitating the Entry into Force of the CTBT, Australia, led by Foreign Minister Alexander Downer, emphasized the importance of the treaty in constraining nuclear weapons development and promoting disarmament.

In Belgium, PNND members have influenced parliamentary actions toward nuclear disarmament. In January 2019, the Belgian Parliament voted on a resolution proposing the removal of U.S. nuclear weapons stationed in the country and called for Belgium to join the UN Treaty on the Prohibition of Nuclear Weapons (TPNW).

PNND members raise formal questions in parliament to ensure oversight of nuclear policies. For example, during the 2005 NPT Review Conference, they organized forums, submitted resolutions, and worked to advance key disarmament initiatives, such as the promotion of a Southern Hemisphere and Adjacent Areas Nuclear Weapon-Free Zone, which was a focus of PNND members in New Zealand.

Members also participate in international delegations and forums, strengthening connections between national legislatures and global disarmament institutions.

== Membership and structure ==
=== Membership eligibility ===
PNND is open to any parliamentarian who supports nuclear non-proliferation and disarmament. The membership eligibility is extended to individuals from state, federal, and regional legislatures worldwide who share this commitment. The organization’s membership has grown significantly over the years, with key reports charting this expansion. Within a decade from 2012 to 2022, the number of member states grew from 50 to 90. This growth reflects PNND’s increasing influence and reach in the global push for nuclear disarmament.

=== Governance structure ===
PNND is led by a Council, which consists of representatives from countries with active membership. The Council is chaired by two Co-Presidents and includes Special Members, Alumni Members, and ex-official members. The governance structure supports engagement through national sections in countries with strong cross-party support and active national initiatives. PNND holds annual assemblies (when resources allow) that feature a parliamentary forum and Council meetings to plan upcoming activities and confirm leadership.

=== Role of national section ===
PNND establishes national sections in countries with strong cross-party membership and active initiatives for nuclear disarmament. These sections work to build parliamentary support for nuclear non-proliferation and disarmament efforts within their respective countries.

=== Key leaders ===
PNND's leadership includes a diverse group of parliamentarians committed to nuclear disarmament. Some of the notable Co-Presidents include:

- Mani Shankar Aiyar (India – Rajya Sabha): A former diplomat and Cabinet Minister, Aiyar has been instrumental in drafting the Rajiv Gandhi Plan for Nuclear Disarmament.
- Saber Hossain Chowdhury (Bangladesh – National Assembly): Active in international parliamentary organizations and a strong advocate for nuclear disarmament.
- Sye-kyun Chung (South Korea – National Assembly): Former Speaker of Parliament and a key figure in South Korea’s political landscape.
- Salwa Damen-Masri (Jordan – Senate): A former Minister and long-time Jordanian Senator, Damen-Masri has also led efforts for women's representation in international peace forums.
- Phil Goff (New Zealand – House of Representatives): Former Minister for Defence, Foreign Affairs, and Disarmament & Arms Control, and Chair of PNND New Zealand.

Additional prominent parliamentarians associated with PNND include Bill Kidd (United Kingdom – Scottish Parliament), Edward Markey (United States – Senate), Sue Miller (United Kingdom – House of Lords), and Marit Nybakk (Norway – Stortinget), all of whom are strong advocates for nuclear disarmament.

== PNND members by country ==
PNND Members by Country
Country	Members	Country	Members
Albania	1	Argentina	3
Armenia	2	Australia	74
Austria	8	Azerbaijan	1
Bahrain	5	Bangladesh	16
Belarus	1	Belgium	16
Bhutan	1	Brazil	3
Cameroun	1	Canada	62
Chile	22	China	2
Congo DR	1	Costa Rica	13
Côte d'Ivoire	2	Cuba	2
Czech Republic	4	Denmark	9
East African Community	1	Ecuador	3
Egypt	3	Estonia	7
European Parliament	28	Micronesia	1
Finland	11	France	22
Gabon	1	Georgia	1
Germany	56	Ghana	3
Greece	1	Guyana	1
Hungary	3	Iceland	8
India	8	Iran	1
Ireland	8	Israel	3
Italy	79	Japan	55
Jordan	15	Kazakhstan	15
Kenya	2	Lebanon	6
Lesotho	1	Liberia	1
Libya	2	Liechtenstein	1
Luxembourg	2	Malawi	5
Malaysia	10	Maldives	1
Mali	1	Malta	1
Marshall Islands	3	Mexico	7
Monaco	1	Mongolia	1
Morocco	4	Mozambique	3
Nepal	1	Netherlands	8
New Zealand	52	Niger	1
Nigeria	8	Norway	22
Pakistan	6	Palestine	7
Paraguay	2	Philippines	4
Portugal	1	Russia	2
Samoa	2	San Marino	1
Saudi Arabia	1	Senegal	1
Sierra Leone	2	Slovakia	1
South Africa	6	South Korea	36
Spain	53	Sri Lanka	1
Sweden	15	Switzerland	13
Tanzania	3	Thailand	4
Trinidad and Tobago	1	Tunisia	1
Turkey	3	Uganda	5
Ukraine	1	UAE	1
UK	52	USA	10
Uruguay	8	Zambia	2
Zimbabwe	1		

== Activities and advocacy ==
The PNND has launched a range of initiatives focused on non-proliferation and nuclear disarmament. These initiatives include themes like Gender, Peace and Security, and International Humanitarian Law. Additionally, some of their efforts are geographically focused, with particular attention to North-East Asia and the Middle East. Primarily, the PNND serves as a lobbying entity within parliamentary bodies, advocating for the reduction of nuclear weapons and the establishment of a robust legal framework to address nuclear concerns. This global network of parliamentarians also draws on the active participation of citizens, encouraging them to engage with their representatives on the issue. PNND fosters debate within parliamentary assemblies worldwide, aiming to build international cooperation among legislators on nuclear disarmament. The organization works in partnership with various actors, including international bodies like the UN and advocacy groups such as ICAN.

PNND has played a significant role in various annual assemblies and parliamentary forums. Notably, at the 2010 Nuclear Non-Proliferation Treaty Review Conference, PNND was present and was praised by UN Secretary-General Ban Ki-moon, who highlighted the crucial role of parliamentarians in ensuring a consistent, global push for nuclear disarmament. Additionally, in 2015, PNND was included in the UN Office for Disarmament Affairs (UNODA) Civil Society and Disarmament publication, alongside other non-governmental organizations focused on nuclear proliferation, highlighting its participation in global disarmament efforts.

In 2016, PNND worked alongside the Organization for Security and Cooperation in Europe (OSCE) to advocate for a no-first-use (NFU) nuclear policy in the United States. This initiative sought to influence the Obama administration, urging it to adopt an official stance that the U.S. would not be the first to use nuclear weapons in a conflict. The push for an NFU policy was rooted in concerns about nuclear escalation, crisis stability, and global non-proliferation efforts. By collaborating with OSCE—a regional security organization that includes both NATO and non-NATO member states—PNND aimed to build international consensus and pressure the U.S. government to take steps toward reducing the risks of nuclear conflict. The debate over NFU gained traction in 2016, but opposition from U.S. allies and some domestic policymakers prevented its formal adoption.

That same year, PNND also played a key role in organizing an anti-nuclear protest in front of the Reichstag in Berlin, partnering with the International Peace Bureau and the World Future Council. The demonstration aimed to raise public awareness about nuclear disarmament and to challenge the continued presence of U.S. nuclear weapons in Germany under NATO’s nuclear sharing policy. The protest was part of a broader European movement against nuclear weapons, particularly targeting the deployment of B61 nuclear bombs at German airbases such as Büchel Air Base. By staging the protest in front of the Reichstag, PNND and its partners sought to influence German lawmakers and push for policies that would lead to the withdrawal of nuclear weapons from German territory. The event was also linked to larger discussions surrounding NATO’s nuclear posture, the Non-Proliferation Treaty (NPT), and the humanitarian consequences of nuclear weapons.

Both initiatives reflect PNND’s strategy of combining diplomatic engagement with grassroots activism to promote nuclear disarmament on a global scale.

Through its advocacy, partnerships, and direct engagement with policymakers, PNND continues to be a driving force in global efforts to advance nuclear disarmament and strengthen international security frameworks.

== Location of PNND assemblies ==
1. 2012 - Astana, Kazakhstan
2. 2014 - Washington, DC

== See also ==
- Anti-nuclear movement
- Anti-nuclear organizations
- Comprehensive Nuclear-Test-Ban Treaty Organization
- Treaty on the Non-Proliferation of Nuclear Weapons
