= Mozn Hassan =

Egyptian women's rights campaigner (born 1979)

- مزن حسن
- Born: 1979 (age 46–47); Saudi Arabia
- Known for: Women's rights campaigns
- Awards: Right Livelihood Award (2016); Charlotte Bunch Human Rights Award (2013)

Mozn Hassan (Arabic: مزن حسن; born 1979) is an Egyptian women's rights campaigner. The founder of Nazra for Feminist Studies, she took part in the protests of the Egyptian revolution of 2011 and worked to help those who were sexually assaulted at the time. Since then she successfully campaigned for changes to be made to the Constitution of Egypt and sexual crime laws to safeguard women. Hassan was awarded the Global Fund for Women’s inaugural Charlotte Bunch Human Rights Award in 2013. She also received the Right Livelihood Awards, known as the "alternative Nobel Peace Prize", in 2016. She is currently subject to a travel ban and asset freeze by the Egyptian government for allegedly violating foreign funding laws.

== Early life ==
Mozn Hassan was born in Saudi Arabia in 1979 to Egyptian parents. Her father worked at a university there and her mother was an academic. Hassan had to wear a veil in Saudi Arabia from the age of 10, against her wishes, until the family returned to Egypt when she was 14. She has a diploma in civil society and human rights from Cairo University and a master's degree in international human rights from the American University of Cairo. Hassan has said that her mother inspired her to become a feminist.

== Women's rights campaigner ==
Hassan founded Nazra for Feminist Studies, a women's rights organization, in 2007 and serves as its executive director. The organisation works to document human rights violations across the country. Nazra took an active part in the protests at Tahrir Square during the Egyptian revolution of 2011 and helped to provide a coordinated response to the sexual assaults that occurred there. Also in 2011 the organisation helped to establish a union for bread sellers in Suez. Since 2012 Nazra has helped to relocate 12 survivors of rape and threatened women's rights activists. It has also provided medical and psychological assistance to more than 60 victims of sexual assault and provided legal advice to more than 100 women who were subject to sexual harassment or were arrested due to participation in protests.

Nazra under Hassan successfully lobbied for the 2014 Constitution of Egypt to address women's rights, for the introduction of laws against sexual harassment, and the expansion of existing laws to cover more sexual crimes. The organisation runs an annual "feminist school" to introduce young people to gender-related issues and mentors young women from across the political spectrum in politics. It supported 16 female candidates in the 2011-12 parliamentary elections, of which one was elected, and five candidates in the 2015 elections, of which one was elected. The group has also produced a play, a comic book, and an all-girls music group. Nazra currently has 20 staff, working with 12 feminist groups across the country.

Hassan established the Women Human Rights Defenders in the Middle East and North Africa to provide a common response to women's rights breaches in the region. She also helped to set up the Caucus for Women Politicians in the Arab Region in 2016.

Hassan received the Global Fund for Women’s inaugural Charlotte Bunch Human Rights Award in 2013. Hassan and Nazra were awarded one of the Right Livelihood Awards, often called the "alternative Nobel Peace Prize", in 2016 "for asserting the equality and rights of women in circumstances where they are subject to ongoing violence, abuse and discrimination".

== 2016 charges ==
Hassan has been questioned on several occasions for her work as an activist. She received a summons from Egyptian police whilst speaking at the United Nations Commission on the Status of Women in New York City in March 2016. She was charged under a law banning the supply of foreign funding or aid (of any kind) to Egyptian non-governmental organisations and faces a life sentence. Her assets and those of Nazra were frozen on 11 January 2017 by the Cairo Criminal Court. Since her return to Egypt she has been prevented from leaving the country by a court-issued travel ban.

The actions of the Egyptian authorities were condemned in a joint-statement by 43 women's rights organisations which described Hassan as "a prominent feminist ... known for her extensive work on feminist movement-building and combating sexual violence in the public sphere". A separate statement signed by 130 academics stated that "we consider the investigation [against] Mozn Hassan a direct threat to the feminist and activist engagement of Nazra for Feminist Studies, whose work has focused on contributing to the continuity and development of the feminist movement in Egypt". The travel ban prevented her from travelling to Stockholm to claim her Right Livelihood prize.
