= Otto Körner =

German otorhinolaryngologist (1858–1935)

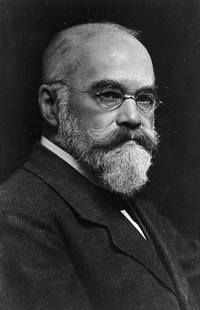
Otto Körner

Otto Körner (18 May 1858 in Frankfurt am Main – 9 October 1935 in Rostock) was a German otorhinolaryngologist.

From 1878 to 1882 he studied medicine at the universities of Marburg, Freiburg and Strasbourg, where he was a student of internist Adolf Kussmaul. In 1882 he received his doctorate with a dissertation on the comparative anatomy and physiology of the larynx in animals and humans. After graduation, he remained in Strasbourg as an assistant to Abraham Kuhn, then later on, returned to his hometown of Frankfurt, where from 1886 to 1894 he worked as a general practitioner.

In 1894 he was named as a successor to Christian Lemcke at the University of Rostock, where in 1899 he opened the first university clinic dedicated to ear, nose and throat diseases in Germany. From 1901 to 1929 he was a full professor of otorhinolaryngology at Rostock.

From 1895 to 1935 he was editor of the Zeitschrift für Ohren- und Kehlkopfheilkunde ("Journal of ear and throat medicine"). In 1913/14 he served as academic rector at the University of Rostock.

== Selected works ==
- Die otitischen Erkrankungen des Hirns, der Hirnhäute und der Blutleiter, 1894 – The otitic diseases of the brain, meninges and sinuses.
- Die Ohrenheilkunde des Hippokrates, 1896 – The otology of Hippocrates.
- Die hygiene des ohres, 1898 – Hygiene of the ear.
- Die eitrigen Erkrankungen des Schläfenbeins, 1899 – The purulent diseases of the temporal bone.
- Lehrbuch der Ohrenheilkunde und ihrer Grenzgebiete, 1906 – Textbook of otology and its periphery.
- Lehrbuch der Ohren-, Nasen- und Kehlkopf-Krankheiten, 1909 – Textbook of ear, nose and throat diseases.
- Geist und Methode der Natur- und Krankheitsbeobachtung im griechischen Altertume, 1914 – Spirit and method of nature and disease observation in ancient Greece.
- Das homerische Tiersystem und seine Bedeutung für die zoologische Systematik des Aristoteles, 1917 – The Homeric animal system and its importance for the zoological classification of Aristotle.
