= András Bíró =

Hungarian journalist (1925–2024)

- Born: 20 October 1925; Sofia, Bulgaria
- Died: 18 June 2024 (aged 98)
- Occupations: Journalist, journal editor
- Known for: Environment activist and human rights activist
- Awards: Right Livelihood Award (1995)

András Bíró (20 October 1925 – 18 June 2024) was a Hungarian journalist, journal editor, environment activist and human rights activist, noted for his support of the Romani people in Hungary.

== Life and career ==
Bíró was born to Hungarian and Serbian parents in Sofia on 20 October 1925. After returning to Hungary, he subsequently fled the country following the Hungarian Revolution of 1956, settling in France. He was a founding editor of the UN family journals Ceres and Mazingira.

In 1986, Bíró returned to Hungary. He founded the organization Hungarian Foundation for Self-Reliance (Hungarian: Autonómia Alapítvány) in 1990, which supported Hungary's Romani community by supporting small projects, such as purchasing land for farmers to rear livestock. In 1995, he and the organisation were awarded the Right Livelihood Award "for their resolute defence of Hungary's Roma minority and effective efforts to aid their self-development."

Bíró died on 18 June 2024, at the age of 98.
