= Cindy Duehring =

American activist and researcher

Cindy Duehring

Cindy Duehring (August 10, 1962 – June 29, 1999) was an American activist and researcher. Duehring was the daughter of Donald and Jan Froeschle. In 1985, while studying pre-med in Seattle, WA, Cindy was severely poisoned by a misapplication of pesticides in her apartment. As a result of this contamination or intoxication of an insecticide (against fleas) she eventually developed an autoimmune disease. She directed and founded the Environmental Access Research Network (EARN) which merged with the Chemical Injury Information Network (CIIN) in 1994. Duehring received the Resourceful Woman Leadership Award in 1994 and the Right Livelihood Award in 1997.

== See also ==
- Multiple chemical sensitivity
