= Citizens' Coalition for Economic Justice =

Citizens' Coalition for Economic Justice (CCEJ; Korean: 경제정의실천시민연합) is a citizens' movement in South Korea, which was founded in 1989. The movement works for economic justice, protection of the environment, for the reunification of Korea and for democratic and social development. The organisation has 35 branches with approximately 35,000 members.

In voicing the concerns of citizens, CCEJ has achieved improvements within education, developed policy alternatives, and lobbied for legal reforms. It organizes many public discussions and hearings and informs the press about the concerns of citizens. It has expanded its goal of economic justice on a global level.

In 2003, CCEJ received the Right Livelihood Award for its efforts in creating a "reform programme, based on social justice."
