= Legesse Wolde-Yohannes =

Ethiopian horticultural scientist

- Born: January 19, 1936 (age 90)
- Citizenship: Ethiopia
- Occupation: horticulturist Scientist
- Employer: Addis Ababa University
- Awards: Right Livelihood Award

Legesse Wolde-Yohannes (Amharic: ለገሠ ወልደዮሓንስ; born January 19, 1936) is an Ethiopian horticultural scientist. He cooperated with Aklilu Lemma on the discovery and research of how to use the plant endod as a means of preventing the parasitic disease bilharzia. He was awarded the Right Livelihood Award in 1989, jointly with Lemma, for discovering and campaigning relentlessly for an affordable preventative against bilharzia.

== Career ==
During Wolde-Yohannes' career, he provided an affordable solution to a fatal illness or schistosomiasis, which can be fatal, is often found in continents like Asia and Africa and affects more than 200 million people.

He worked with another Ethiopian doctor (Aklilu Lemma) to help produce more research on Schistosomiasis. He found that this disease was so common in Africa because it was found in Soapberry. This is a plant that is commonly used as soap in Africa, but it has a potent molluscicide. Although this was useful research, it only provided a cure to a small portion of people suffering from schistosomiasis. He yearned to help more people suffering from the disease, so he found other scientists and doctors to run more field and laboratory trials. He was later able to get this plant grown in multiple countries for control of Schistosomiasis.

Along with he persistent research, Legesse Wolde-Yohannes was also an associate professor of biology at Addis Ababa University in Addis Ababa Ethiopia. He also serves as a director of the National Endod Foundation.

In 1999 after a long career of research, Wolde-Yohannes become a senior advisor on endod and medicinal plants to the EthioAgri-CEFT Private Limited Company. He works to promote agrobotanical studies on endod, and makes other medicinal plants available for large scale production for local and international marketing.

== Awards and recognition ==
In recognition of his scientific achievements, Wolde-Yohannes was awarded the Golden Medal by the University of Oslo, Norway in 1989. He also received the Golden Medal and Certificate of Merit from Addis Ababa University in 2000.
