= Right Livelihood Award =

Award for solutions to challenges facing the world

- Awarded for: "Practical and exemplary solutions to the most urgent challenges facing the world today"
- Country: Sweden
- Presented by: Right Livelihood
- First award: 1980
- Website: rightlivelihood.org

The Right Livelihood Award is an international award to "honour and support those offering practical and exemplary answers to the most urgent challenges facing us today." The prize was established in 1980 by German-Swedish philanthropist Jakob von Uexküll, and is presented annually in early December. An international jury, invited by the five regular Right Livelihood Award board members, decides the awards in such fields as environmental protection, human rights, sustainable development, health, education, and peace. The prize money is shared among the winners, usually numbering four, and is €200,000. Very often one of the four laureates receives an honorary award, which means that the other three share the prize money.

Although it has been promoted as an "Alternative Nobel Prize", it does not have any organizational ties at all to the awarding institutions of the Nobel Prize or the Nobel Foundation.

The Right Livelihood Award committee arranged for awards to be made in the Riksdag of Sweden the day before the Nobel prizes and the economics prize are awarded in Stockholm. The Right Livelihood Awards are generally understood as a critique of the traditional Nobel prizes.

The establishment of this award followed a failed attempt to have the Nobel Foundation create new prizes in the areas of environmental protection, sustainable development and human rights. The prize has been awarded to a diverse group of people and organisations, including Wangari Maathai, Astrid Lindgren, Bianca Jagger, Mordechai Vanunu, Leopold Kohr, Arna Mer-Khamis, Felicia Langer, Petra Kelly, Survival International, Amy Goodman, Catherine Hamlin, Memorial, Edward Snowden, Daniel Ellsberg, and Greta Thunberg.

== Ceremony ==
Since 1985, the ceremony has taken place in Stockholm's old Parliament building, in the days before the traditional Nobel prizes are awarded in the same city. A group of Swedish Parliamentarians from different parties host the ceremony; in 2009 European Commissioner Margot Wallström co-hosted the ceremony. However, in 2014 when it became public that one of the recipients of the 2014 prize was whistleblower Edward Snowden, the ceremonial group was disinvited from the Ministry for Foreign Affairs building in Stockholm.

In 2019, marking the 40th anniversary of the foundation of the Award, the ceremony was held at Cirkus in front of a live audience of more than 1,200 people. World-renowned artists such as José González and Ane Brun were among the night's performers.

== Nature of the award ==
Some media refer to the prize as the Alternative Nobel Prize, and the prize is frequently understood as a critique of the traditional Nobel prizes. The prize differs significantly from the Nobel Prizes:

- It is not a fulfillment of Alfred Nobel's bequest and thus not one of Nobel's own prizes.
- It has an open nomination process (anyone can nominate anyone else, except close relatives or their own organizations).
- It is not limited to specific categories.
- The prize money is considerably lower than that of the Nobel Prize. Currently it is €200,000 compared to about €1,000,000 for a Nobel Prize.
- The funds for the prizes now come from donations. while the Nobel Prizes come from the revenue of Alfred Nobel's fortune. The Nobel Memorial Prize in Economic Sciences (which is technically not a Nobel Prize) is financed by the Sveriges Riksbank.

== History ==
Jakob von Uexküll, a philanthropist, sold his stamp collection worth US$1 million, which provided the initial funding for the award. Before establishing the award in 1980, von Uexkull had tried to persuade the Nobel Foundation to establish new prizes to be awarded together with the Nobel Prizes. He suggested new prize categories to be created: one in ecology and one in development. Like the Nobel Economics Prize, this would have been possible with an amendment to the Nobel Foundation statutes and funding of the prize amount completely separate from Nobel's fortune. The Nobel Prize amount was 880,000 Swedish kronor at that time, which corresponded to US$195,000. However, as a result of the debate that followed the establishment of the Sveriges Riksbank Prize in Economic Sciences in Memory of Alfred Nobel (first awarded in 1969), the Nobel Foundation had decided not to associate the Nobel Prize with any additional awards, so von Uexküll's proposal was rejected.

From 1980 to 2021, the foundation presented awards to 186 laureates from 73 countries. Its self-described purpose is to bestow prizes and thus publicize the work of recipients' local solutions to worldwide problems.

== Laureates ==
Year	Image	Laureates	Country	Citation
1980		Hassan Fathy	Egypt	"for developing an 'Architecture for the Poor'."
1980		Stephen Gaskin	United States; Guatemala; Lesotho	"for caring, sharing and acting with and on behalf of those in need at home and abroad."
1980		Plenty International	United States; Guatemala; Lesotho	"for caring, sharing and acting with and on behalf of those in need at home and abroad."
1981		Mike Cooley	United Kingdom	"for designing and promoting the theory and practice of human-centred, socially useful production."
1981		Bill Mollison	Australia	"for developing and promoting the theory and practice of permaculture."
1981		Patrick van Rensburg	Botswana; South Africa	"for developing replicable educational models for the third world majority."
1981		Foundation for Education with Production (FEP)	Botswana; South Africa	"for developing replicable educational models for the third world majority."
1982		Erik Dammann (1931-2025)	Norway	"for challenging Western values and lifestyles in order to promote a more responsible attitude to the environment and the third world."
1982		Anwar Fazal	Malaysia	"for fighting for the rights of consumers and helping them to do the same."
1982		Petra Kelly	Germany	"for forging and implementing a new vision uniting ecological concerns with disarmament, social justice and human rights."
1982		Participatory Institute for Development Alternatives (PIDA)	Sri Lanka	"for developing exemplary processes of self-reliant, participatory development among the poor in Asia."
1982		George Trevelyan	United Kingdom	"for educating the adult spirit to a new non-materialistic vision of human nature."
1983		Leopold Kohr	Austria	"for his early inspiration of the movement for a human scale."
1983		Amory Lovins (b 1947)	United States	"for pioneering soft energy paths for global security."
1983		Hunter Sheldon-Lovins	United States	"for pioneering soft energy paths for global security."
1983		Rocky Mountain Institute (RMI)	United States	"for pioneering soft energy paths for global security."
1983		Manfred Max-Neef	Chile	"for revitalising small and medium-sized communities through 'Barefoot Economics'."
1983		Centre for Development Alternatives (CEPAUR)	Chile	"for revitalising small and medium-sized communities through 'Barefoot Economics'."
1983		Yutaka Gibbons	Palau	"for upholding the democratic, constitutional right of their island to remain nuclear-free."
1983		The People of Belau	Palau	"for upholding the democratic, constitutional right of their island to remain nuclear-free."
1984		Imane Khalifeh	Lebanon	"for inspiring and organising the Beirut peace movement."
1984		Ela Bhatt	India	"for helping home-based producers to organise for their welfare and self-respect."
1984		Self-Employed Women's Association (SEWA)	India	"for helping home-based producers to organise for their welfare and self-respect."
1984		Winefreda Geonzon	Philippines	"for giving assistance to prisoners and aiding their rehabilitation."
1984		Free Legal Assistance Volunteers' Association (FREE LAVA)	Philippines	"for giving assistance to prisoners and aiding their rehabilitation."
1984		Wangari Maathai	Kenya	"for converting the Kenyan ecological debate into mass action for reforestation."
1984		Green Belt Movement (GBM)	Kenya	"for converting the Kenyan ecological debate into mass action for reforestation."
1985		Theo van Boven	Netherlands	"for speaking out on human rights abuse without fear or favour in the international community."
1985		Cary Fowler	United States	"for working to save the world's genetic plant heritage."
1985		Pat Mooney	Canada	"for working to save the world's genetic plant heritage."
1985		Rural Advancement Fund International (RAFI)	United States	"for working to save the world's genetic plant heritage."
1985		Rajni Kothari	India	"for linking and strengthening local groups working to protect civil liberties, women's rights and the environment."
1985		Dialogue of the People [Lokayan]	India	"for linking and strengthening local groups working to protect civil liberties, women's rights and the environment."
1985		János Vargha	Hungary	"for working under unusually difficult circumstances to preserve the river Danube, a vital part of Hungary's environment."
1985		Danube Circle [Duna Kör]	Hungary	"for working under unusually difficult circumstances to preserve the river Danube, a vital part of Hungary's environment."
1986		Robert Jungk	Austria	"for struggling indefatigably on behalf of peace, sane alternatives for the future and ecological awareness."
1986		Rosalie Bertell, S.G.M.	Canada	"for raising public awareness about the destruction of the biosphere and human gene pool, especially by low-level radiation."
1986		Alice Stewart	United Kingdom	"for bringing to light in the face of official opposition the real dangers of low-level radiation."
1986		Helena Norberg-Hodge	Sweden	"for preserving the traditional culture and values of Ladakh against the onslaught of tourism and development."
1986		Ladakh Ecological Development Group (LEDeG)	India	"for preserving the traditional culture and values of Ladakh against the onslaught of tourism and development."
1986		Evaristo Nugkuag Ikanan	Peru	"for organising to protect the rights of the Indians of the Amazon basin."
1986		Interethnic Association for the Development of the Peruvian Rainforest (AIDESEP)	Peru	"for organising to protect the rights of the Indians of the Amazon basin."
1987		Johan Galtung	Norway	"for his systematic and multidisciplinary study of the conditions which can lead to peace."
1987		The Chipko Movement	India	"for its dedication to the conservation, restoration and ecologically-sound use of India's natural resources."
1987		Hans-Peter Dürr	Germany	"for his profound critique of the strategic defence initiative (SDI) and his work to convert high technology to peaceful uses."
1987		Global Challenges Network	Germany	"for his profound critique of the strategic defence initiative (SDI) and his work to convert high technology to peaceful uses."
1987		Frances Moore Lappé	United States	"for revealing the political and economic causes of world hunger and how citizens can help to remedy them."
1987		Institute for Food and Development Policy	United States	"for revealing the political and economic causes of world hunger and how citizens can help to remedy them."
1987		Mordechai Vanunu	Israel	"for his courage and self-sacrifice in revealing the extent of Israel's nuclear weapons programme."
1988		Inge Genefke	Denmark	"for helping those whose lives have been shattered by torture to regain their health and personality."
1988		International Rehabilitation and Research Centre for Torture Victims (IRCT)	Denmark	"for helping those whose lives have been shattered by torture to regain their health and personality."
1988		José Lutzenberger	Brazil	"for his contribution to protecting the natural environment in Brazil and worldwide."
1988		John Charlewood Turner	United Kingdom	"for championing the rights of people to build, manage and sustain their own shelter and communities."
1988		Mohammed Idris	Malaysia	"for their exemplary struggle to save the tropical forests of Sarawak."
1988		Harrison Ngau Laing	Malaysia	"for their exemplary struggle to save the tropical forests of Sarawak."
1988		Friends of Nature Malaysia [Sahabat Alam Malaysia, SAM]	Malaysia	"for their exemplary struggle to save the tropical forests of Sarawak."
1988		the Penan people	Malaysia	"for their exemplary struggle to save the tropical forests of Sarawak."
1989		Seikatsu Club Consumers' Co-operative Union (SCCCU)	Japan	"for creating the most successful, sustainable model of production and consumption in the industrialised world."
1989		Melaku Worede	Ethiopia	"for preserving Ethiopia's genetic wealth by building one of the finest seed conservation centres in the world."
1989		Aklilu Lemma	Ethiopia	"for discovering and campaigning relentlessly for an affordable preventative against bilharzia."
1989		Legesse Wolde-Yohannes	Ethiopia	"for discovering and campaigning relentlessly for an affordable preventative against bilharzia."
1989		Survival International	United Kingdom	"for working with tribal peoples to secure their rights, livelihood and self-determination."
1990		Alice Tepper Marlin	United States	"for showing the direction in which the Western economy must develop to promote the well-being of humanity."
1990		Council on Economic Priorities (SA8000)	United States	"for showing the direction in which the Western economy must develop to promote the well-being of humanity."
1990		Bernard Lédéa Ouédraogo	Burkina Faso	"for strengthening peasant self-help movements all over West Africa."
1990		Felicia Langer	Poland; Israel	"for the exemplary courage of her advocacy for the basic rights of the Palestinian people."
1990		Association of Peasant Workers of the Carare (Asociación de Trabajadores Campesinos del Carare, ATCC)	Colombia	"for its outstanding commitment to peace, family and community in the midst of the most senseless violence."
1991		Edward Goldsmith	United Kingdom	"for his uncompromising critique of industrialism and promotion of environmentally sustainable and socially just alternatives to it."
1991		Baba Amte	India	"for their inspired opposition to the disastrous Narmada Valley dams project and their promotion of alternatives designed to benefit the poor and the environment."
1991		Medha Patkar	India	"for their inspired opposition to the disastrous Narmada Valley dams project and their promotion of alternatives designed to benefit the poor and the environment."
1991		Save the Narmada Movement [Narmada Bachao Andolan, NBA]	India	"for their inspired opposition to the disastrous Narmada Valley dams project and their promotion of alternatives designed to benefit the poor and the environment."
1991		Bengt Danielsson	Sweden; France	"for exposing the tragic results of, and advocating an end, to French nuclear colonialism."
1991		Marie-Thérèse Sailley-Danielsson	Sweden; France	"for exposing the tragic results of, and advocating an end, to French nuclear colonialism."
1991		Jeton Anjain	Marshall Islands	"for their steadfast struggle against United States nuclear policy in support of their right to live on an unpolluted Rongelap island."
1991		The People of Rongelap	Marshall Islands	"for their steadfast struggle against United States nuclear policy in support of their right to live on an unpolluted Rongelap island."
1991		Landless Workers' Movement [Movimento dos Trabalhadores Rurais Sem Terra, MST]	Brazil	"for winning land for landless families and helping them to farm it sustainably."
1992		Finnish Village Action Movement [Suomen Kylät, SK]	Finland	"for showing a dynamic path to rural regeneration decentralisation and popular empowerment."
1992		Zafrullah Chowdhury	Bangladesh	"for their outstanding record of promotion of health and human development."
1992		People's Health Centre [Gonoshasthaya Kendra]	Bangladesh	"for their outstanding record of promotion of health and human development."
1992		Helen Mack Chang	Guatemala	"for her personal courage and persistence in seeking justice and an end to the impunity of political murderers."
1992		John Gofman	United States	"for his pioneering work in exposing the health effects of low-level radiation."
1992		Alla Yaroshynska	Ukraine	"for revealing, against official opposition and persecution, the extent of the damaging effects of the Chernobyl disaster on local people."
1993		Arna Mer-Khamis	Israel	"for passionate commitment to the defence and education of the children of Palestine."
1993		Care and Learning	Israel	"for passionate commitment to the defence and education of the children of Palestine."
1993		Sithembiso Nyoni	Zimbabwe	"for building a remarkable grassroots movement and motivating its million members to follow their own path of human development."
1993		Organisation of Rural Associations for Progress (ORAP)	Zimbabwe	"for building a remarkable grassroots movement and motivating its million members to follow their own path of human development."
1993		Vandana Shiva	India	"for placing women and ecology at the heart of modern development discourse."
1993		Mary Dann	United States	"for exemplary courage and perseverance in asserting the rights of indigenous people to their land."
1993		Carrie Dann	United States	"for exemplary courage and perseverance in asserting the rights of indigenous people to their land."
1994		Astrid Lindgren	Sweden	"for her unique authorship dedicated to the rights of children and respect for their individuality."
1994		Service Volunteered for All (SERVOL)	Trinidad and Tobago	"for fostering spiritual values, cooperation and family responsibility in building society."
1994		Hanumappa Sudarshan	India	"for showing how tribal culture can contribute to a process that secures the basic rights and fundamental needs of indigenous people and conserves their environment."
1994		Vivekananda Girijana Kalyana Kendra (VGKK)	India	"for showing how tribal culture can contribute to a process that secures the basic rights and fundamental needs of indigenous people and conserves their environment."
1994		Ken Saro-Wiwa	Nigeria	"for their exemplary courage in striving non-violently for the civil, economic and environmental rights of their people."
1994		Movement for the Survival of the Ogoni People (MOSOP)	Nigeria	"for their exemplary courage in striving non-violently for the civil, economic and environmental rights of their people."
1995		András Bíró	Hungary	"for their resolute defence of Hungary's Roma minority and effective efforts to aid their self-development."
1995		Hungarian Foundation for Self-Reliance [Autonómia Alapítvány, HFSR]	Hungary	"for their resolute defence of Hungary's Roma minority and effective efforts to aid their self-development."
1995		Serb Civic Council [Srpsko Građansko Vijeće, SGV]	Bosnia and Herzegovina	"for maintaining their support for a humane, multi-ethnic, democratic Bosnia-Herzegovina."
1995		Carmel Budiardjo	IndonesiaUnited Kingdom	"for holding the Indonesian government accountable for its actions and upholding the universality of fundamental human rights."
1995		Political Prisoners [Tahanan Politik, TAPOL]	IndonesiaUnited Kingdom	"for holding the Indonesian government accountable for its actions and upholding the universality of fundamental human rights."
1995		Sulak Sivaraksa	Thailand	"for his vision, activism and spiritual commitment in the quest for a development process that is rooted in democracy, justice and cultural integrity."
1996		Herman Daly	United States	"for defining a path of ecological economics that integrates the key elements of ethics, quality of life, environment and community."
1996		Committee of Soldiers' Mothers of Russia [Союз Комитетов Солдатских Матерей России, CKCMP]	Russia	"for their courage in upholding the common humanity of Russians and Chechens and opposing the militarism and violence in Chechnya."
1996		People's Science Movement of Kerala [Kerala Sasthra Sahithya Parishad, KSSP]	India	"for its major contribution to a model of development rooted in social justice and popular participation."
1996		George Vithoulkas	Greece	"for his outstanding contribution to the revival of homeopathic knowledge and the training of homeopaths to the highest standards."
1997		Joseph Ki-Zerbo	Burkina Faso	"for a lifetime of scholarship and activism that has identified the key principles and processes by which Africans can create a better future."
1997		Jinzaburo Takagi	Japan	"for serving to alert the world to the unparalleled dangers of plutonium to human life."
1997		Mycle Schneider	France	"for serving to alert the world to the unparalleled dangers of plutonium to human life."
1997		Michael Succow	Germany	"for his commitment to safeguard natural eco-systems and areas of outstanding natural value for future generations."
1997		Cindy Duehring	United States	"for putting her personal tragedy at the service of humanity by helping others understand and combat the risks posed by toxic chemicals."
1998		International Baby Food Action Network		"for its committed and affective campaigning in support of breastfeeding."
1998		Samuel Epstein	United States	"for his exemplary life of scholarship wedded to activism on behalf of humanity."
1998		Juan Pablo Orrego	Chile	"for his personal courage, self-sacrifice and perseverance in working for sustainable development in Chile."
1998		Biobío Action Group [Grupo de Acción por el Biobío, GABB]	Chile	"for his personal courage, self-sacrifice and perseverance in working for sustainable development in Chile."
1998		Katarina Kruhonja	Croatia	"for their dedication to a long-term process of peace-building and reconciliation in the Balkans."
1998		Vesna Teršelič	Croatia	"for their dedication to a long-term process of peace-building and reconciliation in the Balkans."
1999		Hermann Scheer	Germany	"for his indefatigable work for the promotion of solar energy worldwide."
1999		Joan Garcés	Spain	"for his long-standing efforts to end the impunity of dictators."
1999		Consolidation of the Amazon Region (COAMA)	Colombia	"for showing how indigenous people can improve their livelihood, sustain their culture and conserve their rainforests."
1999		Organic Agriculture Group [Grupo de Agricultura Orgánica, GAO]	Cuba	"for showing that organic agriculture is a key to both environmental sustainability and food security."
2000		Tewolde Berhan Gebre Egziabher	Ethiopia	"for his exemplary work to safeguard biodiversity and the traditional rights of farmers and communities to their genetic resources."
2000		Munir Said Thalib	Indonesia	"for his courage and dedication in fighting for human rights and civilian control of the military in Indonesia."
2000		Birsel Lemke	Turkey	"for her long-standing struggle to protect her country from the devastation of cyanide-based gold mining."
2000		Wes Jackson	United States	"for his single-minded commitment to developing an agriculture that is both highly productive and truly ecologically sustainable."
2001		José Antonio Abreu	Venezuela	"for achieving a unique cultural renaissance, bringing the joys of music to countless disadvantaged children and communities."
2001		Uri Avnery	Israel	"for their unwavering conviction, in the midst of violence that peace can only be achieved through justice and reconciliation."
2001		Rachel Greenboim-Avnery	Israel	"for their unwavering conviction, in the midst of violence that peace can only be achieved through justice and reconciliation."
2001		Gush Shalom Movement	Israel	"for their unwavering conviction, in the midst of violence that peace can only be achieved through justice and reconciliation."
2001		Leonardo Boff	Brazil	"for his inspiring insights and practical work to help people realise the links between human spirituality, social justice and environmental stewardship."
2001		Trident Ploughshares	United Kingdom	"for providing a practical model of principled, transparent and non-violent direct action dedicated to ridding the world of nuclear weapons."
2002		Martin Green	Australia	"for his dedication and outstanding success in the harnessing of solar energy, the key technological challenge of our age."
2002		Kamenge Youth Centre (Centre Jeunes Kamenge, CJK)	Burundi	"for their exemplary courage and compassion in overcoming ethnic divisions during civil war so that young people can live and build a peaceful future together."
2002		Woman To Woman Foundation [Kvinna Till Kvinna]	Sweden	"for its successes in addressing ethnic hatred by helping war-torn women to be the major agents of peace-building and reconciliation."
2002		Martín Almada	Paraguay	"for his outstanding courage in bringing torturers to justice, and promoting democracy, human rights and sustainable development."
2003		David Lange	New Zealand	"for his steadfast work over many years for a world free of nuclear weapons."
2003		Nicanor Perlas	Philippines	"for his outstanding efforts in educating civil society about the effects of corporate globalisation, and how alternatives to it can be implemented."
2003		Walden Bello	Philippines	"for his outstanding efforts in educating civil society about the effects of corporate globalisation, and how alternatives to it can be implemented."
2003		Citizens' Coalition for Economic Justice (CCEJ)	South Korea	"for its rigorous wide-ranging reform programme, based on economic and social justice, accountability and reconciliation with North Korea."
2003		Ibrahim Abouleish	Egypt	"for a 21st century business model which combines commercial success with social and cultural development."
2003		SEKEM	Egypt	"for a 21st century business model which combines commercial success with social and cultural development."
2004		Swami Agnivesh	India	"for promoting over many years in South Asia the values of religious and communal co-existence, tolerance and mutual understanding."
2004		Asghar Ali Engineer	India	"for promoting over many years in South Asia the values of religious and communal co-existence, tolerance and mutual understanding."
2004		Memorial Society	Russia	"for showing, in traumatic times, the importance of understanding the historical roots of human rights abuse, to secure respect for them in the future."
2004		Bianca Jagger	Nicaragua	"for her dedicated commitment and campaigning for human rights, social justice and environmental protection."
2004		Raúl Montenegro	Argentina	"for his outstanding work with local communities and indigenous people to protect the environment and natural resources."
2005		Maude Barlow	Canada	"for their exemplary and longstanding worldwide work for trade justice and the recognition of the fundamental human right to water."
2005		Tony Clarke	Canada	"for their exemplary and longstanding worldwide work for trade justice and the recognition of the fundamental human right to water."
2005		Irene Fernandez	Malaysia	"for her outstanding and courageous work to stop violence against women and abuses of migrant and poor workers."
2005		Roy Sesana	Botswana	"for his resolute resistance against eviction from their ancestral lands, and for upholding the right to their traditional way of life."
2005		First People of the Kalahari (FPK)	Botswana	"for his resolute resistance against eviction from their ancestral lands, and for upholding the right to their traditional way of life."
2005		Francisco Toledo	Mexico	"for devoting himself and his art to the protection and enhancement of the heritage, environment and community life of his native Oaxaca."
2006		Daniel Ellsberg	United States	"for putting peace and truth first, at considerable personal risk, and dedicating his life to inspiring others to follow his example."
2006		Ruth Manorama	India	"for her commitment over decades to achieving equality for Dalit women, building effective and committed women's organisations and working for their rights at national and international levels."
2006		Chico Whitaker	Brazil	"for a lifetime's dedicated work for social justice that has strengthened democracy in Brazil and helped give birth to the World Social Forum, showing that 'another world is possible'."
2006		International Poetry Festival of Medellín [Festival Internacional de Poesía de Medellín]	Colombia	"for showing how creativity, beauty, free expression and community can flourish amongst and overcome even deeply entrenched fear and violence."
2007		Christopher Weeramantry	Sri Lanka	"for his lifetime of ground-breaking work to strengthen and expand the rule of international law."
2007		Dekha Ibrahim Abdi	Kenya	"for showing in diverse ethnic and cultural situations how religious and other differences can be reconciled, even after violent conflict, and knitted together through a cooperative process that leads to peace and development."
2007		Percy Schmeiser	Canada	"for their courage in defending biodiversity and farmers' rights, and challenging the environmental and moral perversity of current interpretations of patent laws."
2007		Louise Walken-Schmeiser	Canada	"for their courage in defending biodiversity and farmers' rights, and challenging the environmental and moral perversity of current interpretations of patent laws."
2007		Grameen Shakti (GS)	Bangladesh	"for bringing sustainable light and power to thousands of Bangladeshi villages, promoting health, education, and productivity."
2008		Krishnammal Jagannathan	India	"for two long lifetimes of work dedicated to realising in practice the Gandhian vision of social justice and sustainable human development, for which they have been referred to as 'India's soul'."
2008		Sankaralingam Jagannathan	India	"for two long lifetimes of work dedicated to realising in practice the Gandhian vision of social justice and sustainable human development, for which they have been referred to as 'India's soul'."
2008		Land for Tillers' Freedom (LAFTI)	India	"for two long lifetimes of work dedicated to realising in practice the Gandhian vision of social justice and sustainable human development, for which they have been referred to as 'India's soul'."
2008		Amy Goodman	United States	"for developing an innovative model of truly independent political journalism that brings to millions of people the alternative voices that are often excluded by mainstream media."
2008		Asha Haji Elmi	Somalia	"for continuing to lead at great personal risk the female participation in the peace and reconciliation process in her war-ravaged country."
2008		Monika Hauser	SwitzerlandItaly	"for her tireless commitment to working with women who have experienced the most horrific sexual violence in some of the most dangerous countries in the world, and campaigning for them to receive social recognition and compensation."
2009		Catherine Hamlin	AustraliaEthiopia	"for her fifty years dedicated to treating obstetric fistula patients, thereby restoring the health, hope and dignity of thousands of Africa's poorest women."
2009		René Ngongo	Democratic Republic of the Congo	"for his courage in confronting the forces that are destroying the Congo's rainforests and building political support for their conservation and sustainable use."
2009		David Suzuki	Canada	"for his lifetime advocacy of the socially responsible use of science, and for his massive contribution to raising awareness about the perils of climate change and building public support for policies to address it."
2009		Alyn Ware	New Zealand	"for his effective and creative advocacy and initiatives over two decades to further peace education and to rid the world of nuclear weapons."
2010		Nnimmo Bassey	Nigeria	"for revealing the full ecological and human horrors of oil production and for his inspired work to strengthen the environmental movement in Nigeria and globally."
2010		Erwin Kräutler, C.Pp.S.	AustriaBrazil	"for a lifetime of work for the human and environmental rights of indigenous peoples and for his tireless efforts to save the Amazon forest from destruction."
2010		Shrikrishna Upadhyay	Nepal	"for demonstrating over many years the power of community mobilisation to address the multiple causes of poverty even when threatened by political violence and instability."
2010		Support Activities for Poor Producers of Nepal (SAPPROS)	Nepal	"for demonstrating over many years the power of community mobilisation to address the multiple causes of poverty even when threatened by political violence and instability."
2010		Physicians for Human Rights–Israel (PHR-I)	Israel	"for their indomitable spirit in working for the right to health for all people in Israel and Palestine."
2011		Huang Ming	China	"for his outstanding success in the development and mass-deployment of cutting-edge technologies for harnessing solar energy, thereby showing how dynamic emerging economies can contribute to resolving the global crisis of anthropogenic climate change."
2011		Jacqueline Moudeina	Chad	"for her tireless efforts at great personal risk to win justice for the victims of the former dictatorship in Chad and to increase awareness and observance of human rights in Africa."
2011		GRAIN	Spain	"for their worldwide work to protect the livelihoods and rights of farming communities and to expose the massive purchases of farmland in developing countries by foreign financial interests."
2011		Ina May Gaskin	United States	"for her whole-life's work teaching and advocating safe, woman-centred childbirth methods that best promote the physical and mental health of mother and child."
2012		Campaign Against Arms Trade (CAAT)	United Kingdom	"for their innovative and effective campaigning against the global trade in arms."
2012		Gene Sharp	United States	"for developing and articulating the core principles and strategies of nonviolent resistance and supporting their practical implementation in conflict areas around the world."
2012		Hayrettin Karaca	Turkey	"for a lifetime and tireless advocacy and support for the protection and stewardship of our natural world, combining successful entrepreneurship with effective environmental activism."
2012		Sima Samar	Afghanistan	"for her longstanding and courageous dedication to human rights, especially the rights of women, in one of the most complex and dangerous regions in the world."
2013		Paul Walker	United States	"for working tirelessly to rid the world of chemical weapons."
2013		Hans Rudolf Herren	Switzerland	"for his expertise and pioneering work in promoting a safe, secure and sustainable global food supply."
2013		Biovision Foundation	Switzerland	"for his expertise and pioneering work in promoting a safe, secure and sustainable global food supply."
2013		Raji Sourani	Palestine	"for his unwavering dedication to the rule of law and human rights under exceptionally difficult circumstances."
2013		Denis Mukwege	Democratic Republic of the Congo	"for his courageous work healing women survivors of war-time sexual violence and speaking up about its root causes.
2014		Bill McKibben	United States	"for mobilising growing popular support in the USA and around the world for strong action to counter the threat of global climate change."
2014		350.org	United States	"for mobilising growing popular support in the USA and around the world for strong action to counter the threat of global climate change."
2014		Basil Fernando	Sri Lanka	"for his tireless and outstanding work to support and document the implementation of human rights in Asia."
2014		Asian Human Rights Commission (AHRC)	Hong Kong SAR, China	"for his tireless and outstanding work to support and document the implementation of human rights in Asia."
2014		Asma Jahangir	Pakistan	"for defending, protecting and promoting human rights in Pakistan and more widely, often in very difficult and complex situations and at great personal risk."
2014		Alan Rusbridger	United Kingdom	"for building a global media organisation dedicated to responsible journalism in the public interest, undaunted by the challenges of exposing corporate and government malpractices."
2014		Edward Snowden	United States	"for his courage and skill in revealing the unprecedented extent of state surveillance violating basic democratic processes and constitutional rights."
2015		Sheila Watt-Cloutier	Canada	"for her lifelong work to protect the Inuit of the Arctic and defend their right to maintain their livelihoods and culture, which are acutely threatened by climate change."
2015		Tony deBrum	Marshall Islands	"in recognition of their vision and courage to take legal action against the nuclear powers for failing to honour their disarmament obligations under the Nuclear Non-Proliferation Treaty and customary international law."
2015		The People of the Marshall Islands	Marshall Islands	"in recognition of their vision and courage to take legal action against the nuclear powers for failing to honour their disarmament obligations under the Nuclear Non-Proliferation Treaty and customary international law."
2015		Kasha Jacqueline Nabagesera	Uganda	"for her courage and persistence, despite violence and intimidation, in working for the right of LGBTI people to a life free from prejudice and persecution."
2015		Gino Strada	Italy	"for his great humanity and skill in providing outstanding medical and surgical services to the victims of conflict and injustice, while fearlessly addressing the causes of war."
2015		EMERGENCY	Italy	"for his great humanity and skill in providing outstanding medical and surgical services to the victims of conflict and injustice, while fearlessly addressing the causes of war."
2016		Cumhuriyet	Turkey	"for their fearless investigate journalism and commitment to freedom of expression in the face of oppression, censorship, imprisonment and death threats."
2016		Syrian Civil Defense (SCD)	Syria	"for their outstanding bravery, compassion and humanitarian engagement in rescuing civilians from the destruction of the Syrian civil war."
2016		Mozn Hassan	Egypt	"for asserting the equality and rights of women in circumstances where they are subject to ongoing violence, abuse and discrimination."
2016		Nazra for Feminist Studies	Egypt	"for asserting the equality and rights of women in circumstances where they are subject to ongoing violence, abuse and discrimination."
2016		Svetlana Gannushkina	Russia	"for her decades-long commitment to promoting human rights and justice for refugees and forced migrants, and tolerance among different ethnic groups."
2017		Robert Bilott	United States	"for exposing a decades-long history of chemical pollution, winning long-sought justice for the victims, and setting a precedent for effective regulation of hazardous substances."
2017		Colin Gonsalves	India	"for his tireless and innovative use of public interest litigation over three decades to secure fundamental human rights for India's most marginalised and vulnerable citizens."
2017		Khadija Ismayilova	Azerbaijan	"for her courage and tenacity in exposing corruption at the highest levels of government through outstanding investigative journalism in the name of transparency and accountability."
2017		Yetnebersh Nigussie	Ethiopia	"for her inspiring work promoting the rights and inclusion of people with disabilities, allowing them to realise their full potential and changing mind-sets in our societies."
2018		Thelma Aldana Hernández	Guatemala	"for their innovative work in exposing abuse of power and prosecuting corruption, thus rebuilding people's trust in public institutions."
2018		Iván Velásquez Gómez	Colombia	"for their innovative work in exposing abuse of power and prosecuting corruption, thus rebuilding people's trust in public institutions."
2018		Yacouba Sawadogo	Burkina Faso	"for turning barren land into forest and demonstrating how farmers can regenerate their soil with innovative use of indigenous and local knowledge."
2018		Abdullah al-Hamid	Saudi Arabia	"for their visionary and courageous efforts, guided by universal human rights principles, to reform the totalitarian political system in Saudi Arabia."
2018		Mohammad Fahad al-Qahtani	Saudi Arabia	"for their visionary and courageous efforts, guided by universal human rights principles, to reform the totalitarian political system in Saudi Arabia."
2018		Waleed Sami Abulkhair	Saudi Arabia	"for their visionary and courageous efforts, guided by universal human rights principles, to reform the totalitarian political system in Saudi Arabia."
2018		Tony Rinaudo	Australia	"for demonstrating on a large scale how drylands can be greened at minimal cost, improving the livelihoods of millions of people."
2019		Greta Thunberg	Sweden	"for inspiring and amplifying political demands for urgent climate action reflecting scientific facts."
2019		Aminatou Haidar	Western Sahara	"for her steadfast nonviolent action, despite imprisonment and torture, in pursuit of justice and self-determination for the people of Western Sahara."
2019		Davi Kopenawa Yanomami	Brazil	"for their courageous determination to protect the forests and biodiversity of the Amazon, and the lands and culture of its indigenous peoples."
2019		Hutukara Yanomami Association	Brazil	"for their courageous determination to protect the forests and biodiversity of the Amazon, and the lands and culture of its indigenous peoples."
2019		Guo Jianmei	China	"for her pioneering and persistent work in securing women's rights in China."
2020		Nasrin Sotoudeh	Iran	"for her fearless activism, at great personal risk, to promote political freedoms and human rights in Iran."
2020		Bryan Stevenson	United States	"for his inspiring endeavour to reform the US criminal justice system and advance racial reconciliation in the face of historic trauma."
2020		Lottie Cunningham Wren	Nicaragua	"for her ceaseless dedication to the protection of indigenous lands and communities from exploitation and plunder."
2020		Ales Bialiatski	Belarus	"for their resolute struggle for the realisation of democracy and human rights in Belarus."
2020		Viasna Human Rights Centre	Belarus	"for their resolute struggle for the realisation of democracy and human rights in Belarus."
2021		Marthe Wandou	Cameroon	"for building a model of community-based child protection in the face of terrorist insurgency and gender-based violence in the Lake Chad region of Cameroon."
2021		Vladimir Slivyak	Russia	"for his defence of the environment and for helping to ignite grassroots opposition to the coal and nuclear industries in Russia."
2021		Freda Huson	Canada	"for her fearless dedication to reclaiming her people's culture and defending their land against disastrous pipeline projects."
2021		Legal Initiative for Forest and Environment (LIFE)	India	"for their innovative legal work empowering communities to protect their resources in the pursuit of environmental democracy in India."
2022		Oleksandra Matwijtschuk	Ukraine	"for building sustainable democratic institutions in Ukraine and modelling a path to international accountability for war crimes."
2022		Centre for Civil Liberties (CCL)	Ukraine	"for building sustainable democratic institutions in Ukraine and modelling a path to international accountability for war crimes."
2022		Fartuun Adan (mother)	Somalia	"for promoting peace, demilitarisation and human rights in Somalia in the face of terrorism and gender-based violence."
2022		Ilwad Elman (daughter)	Somalia	"for promoting peace, demilitarisation and human rights in Somalia in the face of terrorism and gender-based violence."
2022		Africa Institute for Energy Governance (AFIEGO)	Uganda	"for their courageous work for climate justice and community rights violated by extractivist energy projects in Uganda."
2022		Cecosesola (Central Coperativa de Servicios Sociales del Estado Lara)	Venezuela	"for establishing an equitable and cooperative economic model as a robust alternative to profit-driven economies."
2023		Eunice Brookman-Amissah	Ghana	"for pioneering discussions on women's reproductive rights in Africa, paving the way for liberalised abortion laws and improved safe abortion access."
2023		Mother Nature Cambodia	Cambodia	"for their fearless and engaging activism to preserve Cambodia's natural environment in the context of a highly restricted democratic space."
2023		SOS Méditerranée	Europe	"for its life-saving humanitarian search and rescue operations in the Mediterranean Sea."
2023		Phyllis Omido	Kenya	"for her groundbreaking struggle to secure land and environmental rights for local communities while advancing the field of environmental law."
2024		Joan Carling	Philippines	"for raising Indigenous voices in the face of the global ecological breakdown and her leadership in defending people, lands and culture."
2024		Issa Amro	Palestine	"for their steadfast non-violent resistance to Israel’s illegal occupation, promoting Palestinian civic action through peaceful means."
2024		Youth Against Settlements	Palestine	"for their steadfast non-violent resistance to Israel’s illegal occupation, promoting Palestinian civic action through peaceful means."
2024		Anabela Lemos	Mozambique	"for empowering communities to stand up for their right to say no to exploitative mega-projects and demand environmental justice."
2024		Justiça Ambiental!	Mozambique	"for empowering communities to stand up for their right to say no to exploitative mega-projects and demand environmental justice."
2024		Forensic Architecture	United Kingdom	"for pioneering digital forensic methods to ensure justice and accountability for victims and survivors of human and environmental rights violations."
2025		Pacific Islands Students Fighting Climate Change	Pacific Islands	"For carrying the call for climate justice to the world’s highest court, turning survival into a matter of rights and climate action into a legal responsibility."
2025		Julian Aguon	Guam	"For carrying the call for climate justice to the world’s highest court, turning survival into a matter of rights and climate action into a legal responsibility."
2025		Justice for Myanmar	Myanmar	"For their courage and their pioneering investigative methods in exposing and eroding the international support to Myanmar’s corrupt military."
2025		Audrey Tang	Taiwan	"For advancing the social use of digital technology to empower citizens, renew democracy and heal divides."
2025		Emergency Response Rooms	Sudan	“For building a resilient model of mutual aid amid war and state collapse that sustains millions of people with dignity.”
2026		Jalila Haider	Pakistan	"For breaking barriers, as the first female lawyer from her Hazara community, to challenge ethnic, state and patriarchal persecution, guided by the conviction that no human being is illegal."
2026		Rural Women’s Assembly	South Africa and Southern Africa	"For organising rural women across Southern Africa into a united force defending land, seed and bodily autonomy against corporate and patriarchal dispossession."
2026		Georgian Young Lawyers' Association	Georgia	“For building and safeguarding Georgian democracy and sustaining civic power in the face of an autocratic crackdown.”
2026		Timnit Gebru	USA	"For challenging concentrated power in artificial intelligence and pioneering digital technology rooted in justice, lived experience and human agency."

== See also ==
- Right livelihood
- List of awards for contributions to society
- List of environmental awards
- List of human rights awards
- List of humanitarian and service awards
- List of civil awards and decorations

== Bibliography ==
- Pathiravitana, S. (2007-11-08). A Great Son of Lanka. Sri Lanka Daily News, 8 November 2007. A history of the award. Retrieved on 2008-06-03.
