= Kamenge Youth Centre =

Youth centre in Bujumbura, Burundi

Kamenge Youth Centre (French: Centre Jeunes Kamenge) is a youth centre located in Bujumbura, Burundi. Founded in 1991, the Italian immigrants Claudio Marano, Victor Ghirardi and Marino Bettinsoli had the idea of establishing a place where teenagers could meet in order to live peacefully together in surroundings in which war dominates and in which alcoholism, prostitution, unemployment, and crime are very prevalent. Kamenge Youth Centre is not only a centre where youngsters of the two tribes at enmity Hutu and Tutsi meet, but it is also an educational institution. People have the possibility attend courses, such as languages, mathematics, theatre, natural sciences, physical education and others.

The Youth Centre has been previously funded by the United Nations Population Fund.

In 2001, Kamenge Youth Centre counted around 20,000 members and organised around 30 activities every day. In 2002, the Centre received the Right Livelihood Award for "their exemplary courage and compassion in overcoming ethnic divisions during civil war so that young people can live and build a peaceful future together."
