= Raúl Montenegro =

Argentine biologist (born 1949)

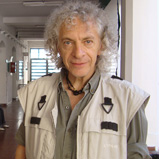
Raúl Montenegro

Raúl Montenegro (born 1949) is an Argentine biologist, environmentalist and activist. He has worked as a professor at the University of Córdoba (Argentina), and at several other educational institutions. In 1982, he founded FUNAM, a grassroots environmental organization, and became its president in 1995. At present, he is FUNAM's representative at the Economic and Social Council at the United Nations.

== Biography ==
Raúl Montenegro has acted as an educator of ecological knowledge and mechanisms throughout Latin America and has taken part in more than one hundred projects to protect the environment. In Guatemala, for example, he stopped a plan to develop a Canadian-backed nuclear power plant. In Argentina, he publicly criticised the leaking of toxic and radioactive materials into the environment.

In addition to his actions, Montenegro has come up with theoretical concepts in order to increase the knowledge and understanding of balanced ecosystems, and has held numerous conferences on this topic. He has managed to bridge the gaps between the environment, development, universities, citizens and NGOs. He is a supporter of the Campaign for the Establishment of a United Nations Parliamentary Assembly, an organisation which campaigns for democratic reformation of the United Nations.

In 1998, he received the Nuclear-Free Future Award and in 2004, the Right Livelihood Award. In 1999, he became honorary president of the grassroots group Salus Terrae.
