= Krishnammal Jagannathan =

Indian activist

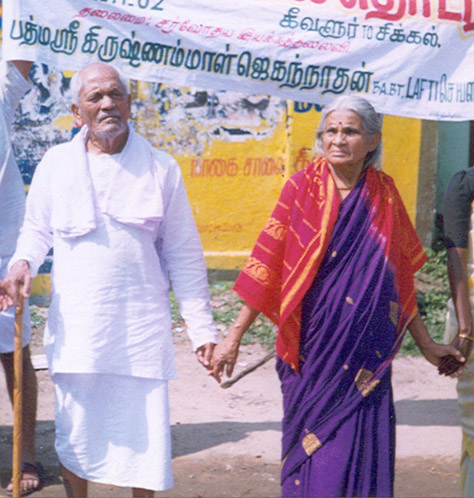
- Krishnammal Jagannathan (right) and Sankaralingam Jagannathan (left)
- Born: 16 June 1926 (age 100)
- Occupation: social activist
- Spouse: Sankaralingam Jagannathan (m. 1950; died 2013)
- Awards: Right Livelihood Award

Krishnammal Jagannathan (born 16 June 1926) is an Indian social activist from the state of Tamil Nadu. She and her husband, Sankaralingam Jagannathan (1912 – 12 February 2013), protested against social injustice and they are Gandhian activists. Her work includes upliftment of the landless, and the poor; she has sometimes fought against governments as well as big industries. She was earlier involved in the Indian independence movement, along with her husband, and was also a close associate of Vinoba Bhave. In 2008 she received the Right Livelihood Award, which she shared with her husband. She was given the Padma Bhushan; India's third highest civilian award; in 2020.

== Early life ==
Jagannathan was born into a Dalit family in 1926. She encountered social injustice and poverty in her daily life as she observed her mother Nagammal who toiled hard and had to continue working even as she was in the advanced stages of pregnancy. Despite being from a poor family, she managed to get a university education and was soon involved with the Gandhian Sarvodaya Movement. It was through Sarvodaya that she met Sankaralingam, who would later become her husband. Sankaralingam hailed from a wealthy family, but discontinued his college education in 1930 in response to Gandhi's call for non-co-operation movement and civil disobedience. Krishnammal shared a stage with Mahatma Gandhi and met with Martin Luther King Jr. Sankaralinga later joined the Quit India Movement in 1942 and spent years in jail before India gained its independence in 1947. Having decided only to marry in independent India Sankaralingam and Krishnammal married in 1950. She would later lead the Salt Satyagraha march in Vedaranyam, this time not in protest, but to commemorate the platinum jubilee of the event in 2006.

== Land to the landless ==
Sankaralingam and Krishnammal believed that one of the key requirements for achieving a Gandhian society is by empowering the rural poor through redistribution of land to the landless. For two years between 1950 and 1952 Sankaralingam was with Vinoba Bhave in Northern India on his Bhoodan (land-gift) Padayatra (pilgrimage on foot), the march appealing to landlords to give one sixth of their land to the landless. Meanwhile, Krishnammal completed her teacher-training course in Madras (now renamed Chennai). When Sankaralingam returned to Tamil Nadu to start the Bhoodhan movement the couple, until 1968, worked for land redistribution through Vinoba Bhave's Gramdan movement (Village Gift, the next phase of the land-gift movement), and through Satyagraha (non-violent resistance). Sankaralingam was imprisoned many times for this work. Between 1953 and 1967, the couple played an active role in the Bhoodhan movement spearheaded by Vinoba Bhave, through which about 4 million acres (16,000 km^{2}) of land were distributed to thousands of landless poor across several Indian states. After the burning of 42 Dalits including women and children in the Kilvenmani massacre in Nagapattinam district following a wage-dispute with the landlord in 1968, the couple started to work in Thanjavur District in Tamil Nadu to concentrate on land reform issues. It was this incident that would inspire the couple, Krishnammal and Sankaralaingam to start the organisation LAFTI.

== Land for Tillers' Freedom (LAFTI) ==
Jagannathan founded Land for Tillers' Freedom in 1981 with her husband. The purpose of the organisation was to bring "the landlords and landless poor to the negotiating table, obtain loans to enable the landless to buy land at reasonable price and then to help them work it cooperatively, so that the loans could be repaid". Although the initial response was lukewarm with banks unwilling to lend and the high rates of stamp duty, Jagannathan managed to go on with the cause. By 2007, through LAFTI, she had transferred 13,000 acres (53 km^{2}) to about 13,000 families. Through LAFTI, she also conducted workshops to allow people, during the nonagricultural season, to support themselves through entrepreneurial efforts like mat weaving, tailoring, plumbing, carpentry, masonry, computer education and electronics. LAFTI would gain such popularity that later even the Government of India would implement LAFTI's approach to increase the peaceful transfer of land.

== Protecting the coastal ecosystem ==
In 1992 Jagannathan started working on issues concerned with prawn farms along the coast of Tamil Nadu. This time the problems were not from the local landlords, but from large industries from cities such as Chennai, Mumbai, Kolkata, Delhi and Hyderabad which occupied large areas of land for aquaculture along the coast, which not only threw the landless labourers out of employment but also converted fertile and cultivable land into salty deserts after a few years when the prawn companies moved on. The prawn farms also caused heavy seepage of seawater into the groundwater in the neighbourhood, thus the local people were deprived of clean drinking water resources. The result is that even more small farmers sell their meagre land-holdings to multinational prawn companies and move to the cities, filling urban slums.

To address prawn farm issue the Jagannathans organised the whole of LAFTI's village movement to raise awareness among the people to oppose the prawn farms. Since 1993, the villagers have offered Satygraha (non-violent resistance), through rallies, fasts, and demonstrations in protest of establishing the prawn farms. They have been beaten up by hired goons, their houses have been burnt, and LAFTI workers have been imprisoned, because of false accusations of looting and arson. Undeterred by this, Jagannathan filed a 'public interest petition' in the Indian Supreme Court, which in turn asked NEERI (National Environmental Engineering Institute of India) to investigate the matter. NEERI's investigation report highlighted the environmental cost of the prawn farms to the nation and recommended all prawn farms within 500 meters of the coast to be banned. In December 1996 the Supreme Court issued a ruling against intensive shrimp farming in cultivable lands within 500 meters of the coastal area. It is said that because of the prawn farmers' local political influence, the Supreme Court judgement was not implemented on the ground. The legal battle around the prawn farms is still not resolved and the Jagannathans continue their struggle to establish non-exploitative, eco-friendly communities in the coastal areas of Tamil Nadu.

Jagannathan also works towards upliftment of women in Dalits and poor. She believes in mobilising women's cause by peaceful means.

== Further achievements and honours ==
Jagannathan, either independently or together with her husband, has established a total of seven non-governmental institutions for the poor. In addition to this she has also played an active role in wider public life. She has been a Senate member of the Gandhigram Trust and University and of Madurai University. She was also a member of a number of local and state social welfare committees and a member of the National Committee on Education, the Land Reform Committee and the Planning Committee.

These activities have gained for the Jagannathans a high profile in India and they have won many awards: the Swami Pranavananda Peace Award (1987); the Jamnalal Bajaj Award (1988) and Padma Shri in 1989. In 1996 the couple received the Bhagavan Mahaveer Award "for propagating non-violence." In 1999 Krishnammal was awarded a Summit Foundation Award (Switzerland), and in 2008 she was awarded 'Opus Prize' by the University of Seattle. She also received the Right Livelihood Award along with her husband "for two long lifetimes of work dedicated to realising in practice the Gandhian vision of social justice and sustainable human development, for which they have been referred to as 'India's soul'". She is lovingly called as Amma (Mother in Tamil) by her followers. She plans to use the award money for her projects rather than for herself. Inspired by Amma's contribution of enabling more than 11000 poor and landless women to become landowners, a M.Phil research dissertation is dedicated to Amma. The dissertation is titled as Aspects of Agrarian History of Tamilakam:Region, Women and Technology during 16th and 17th centuries AD, submitted to Department of History, University of Hyderabad in 2009.
