= Phytolacca dodecandra =

Scientific classification
- Kingdom: Plantae
- Clade: Tracheophytes
- Clade: Angiosperms
- Clade: Eudicots
- Order: Caryophyllales
- Family: Phytolaccaceae
- Genus: Phytolacca
- Species: P. dodecandra

Binomial name
- Phytolacca dodecandra L'Hér.

Synonyms
- Sarcoca dodecandra (L'Hér.) Skalický; Phytolacca abyssinica Hoffm., Comm. Gotting. Phytolacca elongata Salisb., Prodr. Phytolacca lutea Marsigl. ex Steud. Pircunia abyssinica (Hoffm.) Moq.

Species of shrub

Phytolacca dodecandra, commonly known as endod, gopo berry, or African soapberry, is a trailing shrub or climber native to Tropical Africa, Southern Africa, and Madagascar. It is dioecious, with male and female flowers on separate plants. Morphologically, it is highly variable.

Endod (as it is known in Amharic or shibti in Tigrigna ) has been selected and cultivated by Africans for centuries, particularly in Ethiopia and Eritrea. It is used as a soap and shampoo as well as a poison to stun fish. Endod is lethal to snails - a fact discovered by Ethiopian scientists - and may be effective controlling schistosomiasis. After Aklilu Lemma, an Ethiopian scientist, demonstrated endod's potency to American scientists, they took out a patent, hoping to sell endod as a biological control for the Zebra mussel, a pest in the Great Lakes of the US and Canada.

In Ethiopia, two types of "endod" (Phytolacca dodecandra) are known to grow and, while the tree's bark and roots are very poisonous if eaten, the leaves and berries of the tree have been traditionally used by villagers in laundering clothes. The two principal varieties are the Arabe variety, with pinkish to red berries; and the Ahiyo variety, with yellow-green to green berries. The Arabe type has a higher saponin content and better molluscicidal activity than the Ahiyo type (Lugt, 1977). Five species of "endod" are endemic to Ethiopia, but the efficacy of the saponins found in the berries of four of the trees are best when used in their fresh state. One tree produces berries that are efficacious in either their fresh or dry state and are sold in the local marketplaces. The leaves and berries of the endod were first crushed to a powder before being applied to laundry. When mixed with water, they produce a rich lather. Clothes washed in the solution are made supple and scented by its fragrance.

== Bibliography ==
- Lugt (1977), "De zeepbesplant als onderdrukker van bilharzia" ("The soap berry plant as a suppressor of bilharzia"), in: Landbk. Tijdschr. 89 (6), pp. 165–169
