= Marthe Wandou =

Cameroonian women's rights activist (born 1963)

- Born: October 15, 1963 (age 62); Kaélé, Cameroon
- Education: University of Yaoundé
- Known for: Women's rights activism

Marthe Wandou (born 15 October 1963) is a Cameroonian lawyer and women's rights activist.

== Early life and education ==
Wandou was born in Kaélé, Cameroon on 15 October 1963. Her parents were supportive of female education, and she was one of the first women from Kaélé to enroll in university. She received a license in private law at the University of Yaoundé and a master's in project management at the Catholic University of Central Africa. She also studied gender studies at the University of Antwerp.

== Career ==
In 1998, Wandou founded Action Locale pour un Développement Participatif et Autogéré (ALDEPA) to provide female education for young girls in Cameroon and prevent violence against women. She is an advocate of psychosocial support for victims of sexual violence and kidnapping. Wandou provides legal support for victims of gender-based violence. She also provides support for children that are victimised by Boko Haram.

Wandou was a laureate of the Right Livelihood Award in 2021, becoming the first Cameroonian to receive the award. The organisation described her as "one of the leading voices for the protection of girls and women in the region".
