= Yetnebersh Nigussie =

Ethiopian lawyer and disabled rights activist

- የትነበርሽ ንጉሴ
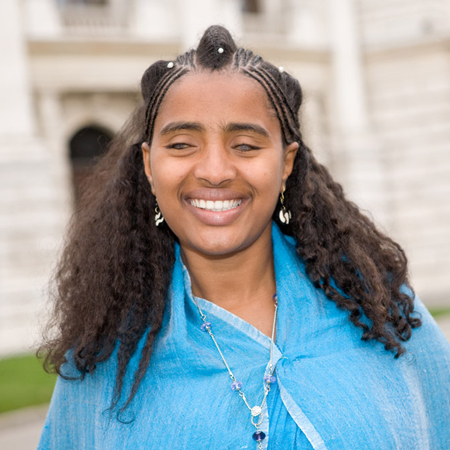
- Nigussie in Vienna, Austria, 2011
- Born: 24 January 1982 (age 44); Sayint, Wollo Province, Socialist Ethiopia
- Education: Addis Ababa University
- Occupations: Lawyer, disability rights activist
- Board member of: Ethiopian Centre for Disability and Development
- Spouse: Besrat Shewsngizaw
- Awards: Right Livelihood Award
- Website: Ethiopian Centre for Disability and Development

Yetnebersh Nigussie (Amharic: የትነበርሽ ንጉሴ; born 24 January 1982) is an Ethiopian lawyer and disability rights activist. In 2017, she was awarded the Right Livelihood Award for "her inspiring work promoting the rights and inclusion of people with disabilities, allowing them to realise their full potential and changing mindsets in our societies."

== Early life and education ==
Yetnebersh Nigussie lost her eyesight at the age of 5 due to a meningitis infection. She describes this instance as an opportunity as it helped her to escape from the early marriage which was widely exercised in Amhara region, at the place where Yetnebersh was born. She attended her primary classes at Shashemane Catholic School for the Blind, then joined Menelik II Senior Secondary School (an inclusive school) and studied there until 12th grade. In addition to her academic involvement in the school, she has chaired more than 6 students' clubs including the students' counsel. She attended Addis Ababa University, where she attained her undergraduate degree in law and her master's in social work. Continuously involved in extracurricular activities, she chaired the AAU Anti-AIDS movement 2004–05 and founded the Addis Ababa University (AAU) Female Students Association in 2006 as well as served as the first president of the association.

== Activism ==
During her service for the Anti-AIDS movement, she has received a number of national and international awards including the AMANITARE award (African Partnership for Sexual and Reproductive Health and Rights of Women and Girls) which she received in 2003 in South Africa for her strong advocacy work for girls' education. Besides her academic life, Yetnebersh served in more than 20 organizations voluntarily out of which the Ethiopian National Association of the Blind Women's Wing happened to be the one she chaired for 4 years (2003–07). Out of that exposure, she decided to found a local organization called Ethiopian Center for Disability and Development (ECDD) along with other prominent Ethiopians to promote the inclusion of persons with disabilities in different development programmes including economic empowerment. As of 2016, Yetnebersh is working with disability and development NGO Light for the World, which she had previously represented as a member of their International Board of Ambassadors.

In September 2017, Yetnebersh was named a joint winner of the Right Livelihood Award, the "Alternative Nobel Prize", "for her inspiring work promoting the rights and inclusion of people with disabilities, allowing them to realise their full potential and changing mindsets in our societies", Sharing the honour with Khadija Ismayilova, Colin Gonsalves, and American environmental lawyer Robert Bilott.

== Personal life ==
Yetnebersh is a convert to Ethiopian Eastern Catholicism, which is a minority in her home country.

== Publications ==
- Nigussie, Yetnebersh (2006). The need for Legal Reform on the rights of Persons with Disabilities in Ethiopia, Addis Ababa University, Faculty of Law, Addis Ababa Ethiopia.
- Nigussie, Yetnebersh & Ransom, Bob (2008). UN Convention on the Rights of Persons with Disabilities: a Call for Action on Poverty, Lack of Access and Discrimination, ECDD, Addis Ababa, Ethiopia.
- Nigussie, Yetnebersh (2009). Psychosocial Dimensions and Employability of Persons with Disabilities, Addis Ababa University, School of Social Work, Addis Ababa, Ethiopia.

== Awards ==
- AMANITARE award for sexual and reproductive health advocates, 2003, Johannesburg, South Africa.
- Individual award for excellent HIV/AIDS prevention and control activities coordination, awarded by the Addis Ababa City Administration in collaboration with the Addis Abeba HIV/AIDS Prevention and Control Office (HAPCO). 7 October 2005, Addis Ababa, Ethiopia.
- Best HIV/AIDS National Activist, awarded by General Medical Practitioners Association, 2005, Addis Ababa, Ethiopia.
- World of Difference 100 Award, awarded by International Alliance for Women (TIAW), 2011.
- Right Livelihood Award 2017
- Spirit of Helen Keller Award 2018
