= Mother Nature Cambodia =

Cambodian environmental activist group

Mother Nature (Khmer: ចលនាមាតាធម្មជាតិ, romanized: chalnea meatea thommocheate) is a Cambodian environmental activist group and former non-governmental organization. The group was founded by Spanish activist Alejandro Gonzalez-Davidson in 2013. The group successfully campaigned and protested to overturn a planned hydropower dam in the Areng Valley in 2014. They have also protested against sand mining and deforestation in Cambodia. The group's advocacy and criticism of the Cambodian government has led to the prosecution and imprisonment of several of its members and Mother Nature having its official NGO status revoked by the Ministry of Interior in 2017.

Gonzalez-Davidson was expelled from the country and sentenced to 20 months in jail in 2015 in absentia. Although he was acquitted in 2019, several Cambodian activists were convicted and imprisoned. A Mother Nature activist was imprisoned in early 2021 for "incitement" for a one-woman protest against the filling of a lake in Phnom Penh. Three activists were arrested charged in June 2021 for various crimes including insulting the King, in a move that was criticised by international human rights groups and the embassies of the United States and Sweden.

Mother Nature Cambodia was selected as one of three laureates for the 2023 Right Livelihood Award, in recognition of their "fearless and engaging activism to preserve Cambodia's natural environment in the context of a highly restricted democratic space".

In July 2024, ten members of the group were found guilty on charges of plotting against the government and sentenced to six years in jail, with three members of the group additionally convicted of insulting Cambodian King Norodom Sihamoni and sentenced to an additional two years in prison. Five of the members attended the trial wearing traditional white clothing worn at funerals, and four of the five activists who were present were reportedly violently arrested after the trial. Their convictions were widely condemned by international human rights organisations with Human Rights Watch describing the case as "politically motivated charges to muzzle criticism of governmental policies.
