= Vladimir Slivyak =

Russian environmentalist (born 1973)

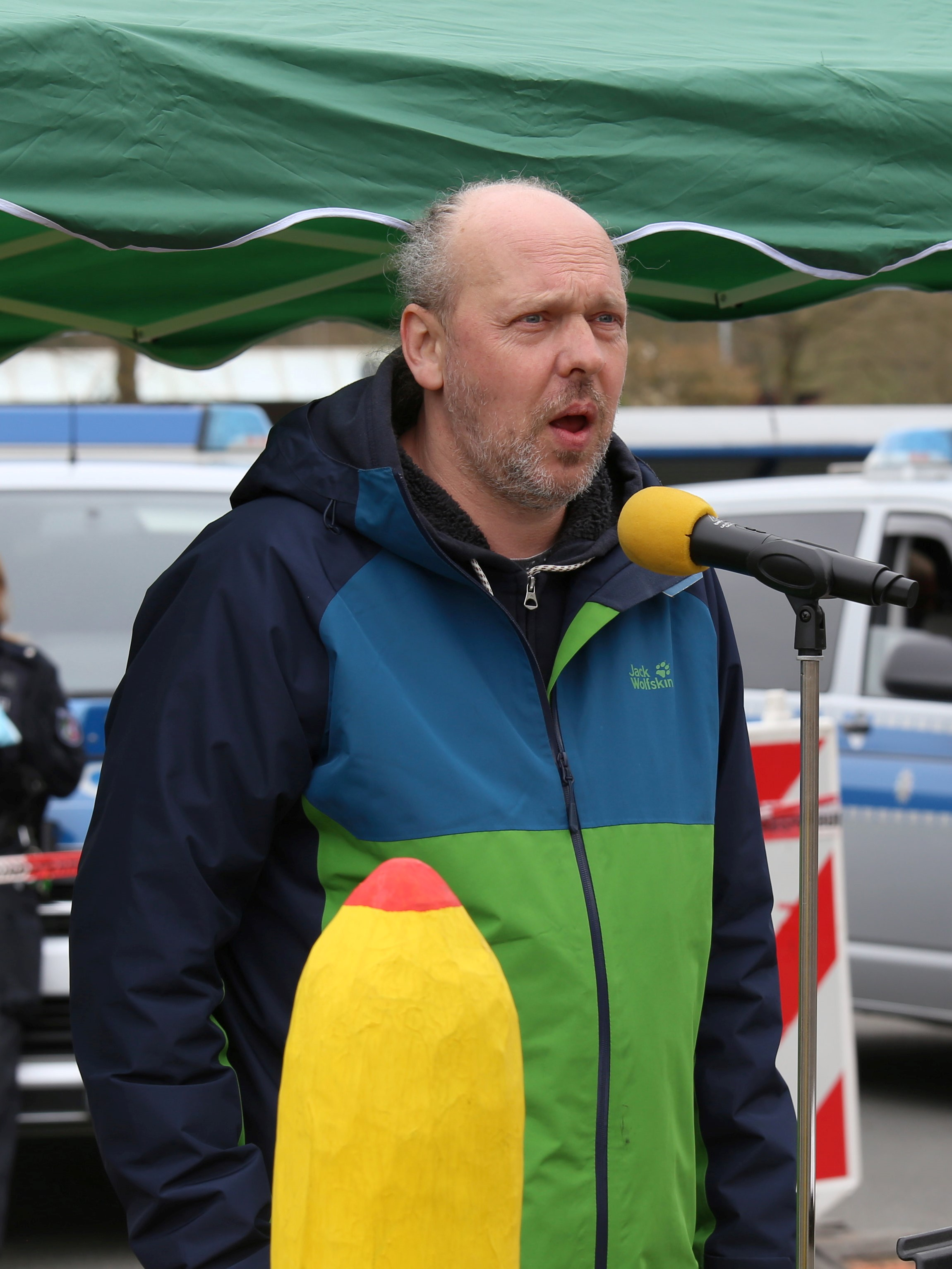
Vladimir Slyviak Hochformat

Vladimir Slivyak is a Russian environmental activist.

== Biography ==
Vladimir Slivyak was born in Kaliningrad in 1973.

In 1989, Slivjak was one of the co-founders of the environmental organization Ecodefense! in Kaliningrad. In 1994, he achieved the decommissioning of a nuclear power plant in Lithuania. He was the first to draw attention to the dangers of transporting depleted uranium from Germany to Russia.

From 2011 to 2015, he taught environmental policy at the Moscow School of Economics.

In 2014, Ecodefense! was the first environmental organization to be classified as a foreign agent in Russia. Slivjak sued and defended himself against the associated restrictions, as did other members of the organization. He emigrated to Germany after the case proved unsuccessful.

In 2019, he and others made a documentary about the destruction of the landscape and threats to health in the Kuzbass coal region.

In 2021, Vladimir Slivyak received the Right Livelihood Award.

In 2022, Schönau Electricity Works was chosen as Stromrebel 2022.
