= Consumers' Association of Penang =

Malaysian NGO

- Formation: 7 November 1969; 56 years ago
- Founder: Mohammed Anwar Fazal
- Type: NGO
- Legal status: Active
- Purpose: Consumer advocacy
- Headquarters: No. 10, Jalan Masjid Negeri, 11600 Jelutong, Pulau Pinang, Malaysia.
- Region served: Malaysia
- President: Mohideen Abdul Kader
- Website: consumer.org.my

Consumers' Association of Penang (CAP) is a Malaysian non-governmental consumer organization. Based on the Penang Island, the organization is focused on the promotion of consumer awareness and consumer rights in Malaysia. It was founded in 1969.

== See also ==
- Sahabat Alam Malaysia
