= Birsel Lemke =

Turkish environmentalist

Birsel Lemke (born 1950) is a Turkish environmentalist.

Between 1975 and 1985 she lived in Germany, but then returned to Turkey, where she became a member of the Green Party. In 1990, she founded the citizens' initiative HAYIR ("no") that works against projects of gold mining near the Turkish Aegean coast in order to preserve this ancient cultural landscape.

In 2000, she received the Right Livelihood Award for her long commitment to protect her country from gold-mining procedures.
