= Sofia Gatica =

Argentine environmentalist

Sofía Gatica
- Born: Sofía Gatica; 1967 (age 58–59); Argentina
- Occupation: environmentalist
- Awards: Goldman Environmental Prize (2012)

Sofía Gatica (born 1967) is an Argentine environmentalist, whose infant daughter Sofia, died just three days after her birth of kidney failure, which is likely caused by pesticide exposure. She was awarded the Goldman Environmental Prize in 2012, for her fight against the use of toxic pesticides used in agriculture in Argentina, in particular agents containing glyphosate and endosulfan. In November 2013 she was threatened with death at gunpoint and beaten by unidentified men.

== Commitment to herbicide spraying ==
The trigger for Gatica's commitment was the death of her daughter, who died of kidney failure three days after birth in the late 1990s. She researched the causes of the disease and in conversation with neighbors came across worrying and inexplicable health problems. Gatica attributed this to spraying campaigns with the herbicides Roundup and Endosulfan in the immediate vicinity of residential areas. The place where Gaticas lives is surrounded by genetically modified soybean plantations that have been regularly sprayed with appropriate herbicides.

Gatica subsequently founded the group the Mothers of Ituzaingó, which set itself the goal of stopping the ruthless use of agrochemicals. They conducted a door-to-door survey, the first epidemiology survey in the region on the effects of pesticide spraying on human health. The results showed that cancer was 41 times higher than the national average, and the incidence of neurological diseases, respiratory diseases, birth defects and child mortality were also noticeable.

Based on this knowledge, the Mothers of Ituzaingó contacted Argentine environmental organizations and initiated a stop spraying campaign. Press conferences and demonstrations on the subject were organized, and brochures were issued to educate the population about the dangers of pesticides. Gatica contacted scientific institutions and asked for studies that supported her observations.

The activities of the Gatica group were made more difficult by the fact that there was no direct way to demand accountability from Monsanto DuPont and other global agrochemical groups. Pressure was also exerted on the group by police officers and local business people. In 2007 Gatica was threatened by a person who had broken her house while using weapons and asked to drop her involvement.

== Results ==
In 2008, the then Argentine President Cristina Kirchner commissioned the Ministry of Health to conduct an investigation into the effects of pesticide use in Itzuingó. The Department of Medicine at the University of Buenos Aires was entrusted with a corresponding study. The results of this confirmed the theses of the Mothers of Ituzaingó regarding the connection between herbicide spraying and the health of the population. Gatica subsequently succeeded in getting a municipal ordinance banning spraying at a distance of fewer than 2,500 meters from dwellings. In 2010, the Supreme Court reversed the burden of proof, according to which the residents no longer have to prove the harmfulness of spraying, but the government and soybean growers must provide proof of safety.

== Further activities ==
In September 2012, a meeting between the Rhineland-Palatinate Agriculture Minister, Ulrike Höfken, and Gatica took place. It was jointly advocated that the pesticide glyphosate should be re-examined worldwide and that a scientific reassessment of the substance should be requested by independent researchers.

In 2013 Gatica campaigned in the central Argentine province of Córdoba against the construction of a large corn seed processing plant for the Monsanto Group. In September 2013, for example, they organized a blockade of the access road to the planned seed factory, whereupon construction work was stopped. On February 10, 2014, this action, which lasted more than five months, resulted in the Environmental impact assessment submitted by Monsanto for the new factory not being approved by the technical committee of the Ministry of the Environment. In August 2016, a Monsanto employee told the newspaper iProfessional that the company was withdrawing from this project. The reasons he cited were economic developments and the effects of long-term protests by residents. Gatica commented: "If the resistance stirs from below, it will bring down those above".
