= Christian Lemcke =

German otolaryngologist (1850–1894)

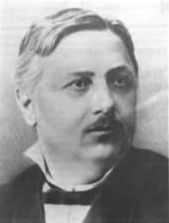
Christian Lemcke

Christian Lemcke (8 December 1850, in Bergrade – 12 September 1894, in Rostock) was a German otolaryngologist, known for his efforts in the development of otolaryngology as a single specialty at the University of Rostock.

From 1875 he studied medicine at the universities of Rostock, Würzburg and Berlin, receiving his doctorate at Rostock in 1880. After graduation, he remained in Rostock as an assistant to internist Theodor Thierfelder. In 1885 he obtained his habilitation, and in 1893 was named an associate professor of ear and throat diseases at the university. He died during the following year at the age of 43, his successor at Rostock being Otto Körner.

In 1892 he published Die Taubstummheit in Grossherzogthum Mecklenburg-Schwein, ihre urschen und ihre Verhütung. Eine statistisch-otologische Studie, 1892 ("Deaf-muteness in the Grand Duchy of Mecklenburg-Schwerin, its causes and prevention").
