= Nazra for Feminist Studies =

- Founded: 2007
- Founder: Mozn Hassan
- Purpose: Women's rights
- Location: Cairo, Egypt
- Region served: Middle East and North Africa
- Website: www.nazra.org/en

Nazra for Feminist Studies is a women's rights organisation based in Egypt. This group contributes to the continuity and development of the Egyptian and regional feminist movement in the Middle East and North Africa. The group believes that feminism and gender are political and social issues affecting freedom and development in all societies. The group provides support in relation to gender-based violence and discrimination as well as gender equality and women's presence in the public sphere. Nazra has a particular focus on youth groups seeking support for gender-related causes.

Women human rights defenders (WHRDs) working in Nazra face strong traditional and patriarchal structures which make campaigning against gender violence and inequality difficult. The group has documented many cases of violations against women in which members of the police and medical personnel engaged in victim-blaming or caused further discrimination or harm when the original rights violations were reported.

== Founder ==
The group was founded by Egyptian feminist activist Mozn Hassan in Cairo in December 2007. Having received the Charlotte Bunch Award for her work on Women's Human Rights in 2013, a travel ban order was imposed on her in 2016, which prevented her from leaving Egypt. She has received the Right Livelihood Award, known as the Alternative Nobel Prize, for her work on women's human rights and is a board member of the Global Fund for Women.

== Interrogation ==
In March 2018, the assets of the group and of Mozn Hassan were frozen by the Egyptian government at Cairo Elementary Court, in a case referred to in the Egyptian media as the "foreign funding" case 173/2011. This asset freeze was unprecedented, with Nazra being the only NGO targeted and some staff received a summons for interrogation.

Volunteers work on behalf of the group, despite the lack of a stable office space. The Nazra worker's case is part of a wider movement of human rights groups who are making public their fear of a #aShutteredPublicSphere.
