= Sahabat Alam Malaysia =

Malaysian environment NGO

Sahabat Alam Malaysia-Friends of the Earth Malaysia", abbreviated as SAM, is a Malaysian NGO established in 1977 to fight for causes related to the Malaysian environment. SAM joined Friends of the Earth International (FoEI) in 1983, and also publishes books and news magazines. SAM's role includes campaigns on pollution, land use, deforestation, fisheries, energy, water, hydroelectric dams, agriculture, indigenous rights and tourism. Its current President is Meenakshi Raman. It is based in Penang and Sarawak.

History

The organization was founded in 1977 in Malaysia in response to worsening environmental deterioration. It has now expanded to include issues such as fisheries, energy, water, dams, agriculture, Indigenous Peoples’ rights, and tourism. It was founded under the Societies Act of 1966 in Malaysia. The organization operates two offices, one from Penang in Peninsular Malaysia and the other in the state of Sarawak, Borneo. The Penang office, the organization’s headquarters, is focused on issues in Peninsular Malaysia, while the Marudi office is responsible for issues and activities in Sarawak. In 1983, the organization joined Friends of the Earth International and has been an active member since. The organization has been active in environmental concerns within Malaysia but also aboard including discouragement to not promote carbon capture technology in Japan and Malaysia.

Objectives

Sahabat Alam Malyasia’s objectives include promoting to ensure that future and current development decisions and the management of natural resources are sustainable and ecologically sound. They believe that the protection of natural resources can only be effectively done when there is equity in society, where the rights of indigenous peoples, farmers, fishermen and the local communities to natural resources are respected, and gender justice is protected. They heavily promote environmental concerns, fisheries and marine, tourism, sustainable agriculture, and indigenous rights. The organization says that environmental justice, social justice, human dignity and human rights to sustainable resources have to be protected. They promote creating a more peaceful and sustainable future where societies live in harmony with nature and have more independence and dignity.

Accomplishments

In 1988, the organization received the Right Livelihood Award for its actions to protect a rainforest in Sarawak, Malaysia. Then, in 1991, the organization received recognition for bringing global attention to the deforestation of Sarawak's forests. They have also trained local farmers, fishers, and indigenous communities to protect their resources and communities. Sahabat Alam Malaysia conducted a survey that found possible evidence of encroachments in the Samunsam Wildlife Sanctuary, Maludam National Park, and Similajau National Park, which is one of the most diverse tropical forests in Lambir National Park, where illegal logging is being done.

Education

SAM focuses heavy in environmental education to empower communities to make safer, more sustainable choices. Some of the ways the organization achieves this include public awareness campaigns, publishing publications, and lobbying for policy changes. They have also had collaborations with other NGOs in Malaysia. Such recent examples are working with “ Save Rivers” when the two NGOs expressed their solidarity with indigenous communities from Logan Entasan, Lobang Kompeni, and Sungai Brit who are affected by the Marudi Forest Conservation and Restoration Project. SAM opposes the project as they believe the project needs to strengthen respect for Native customary rights. In collaboration with other NGOs, they lobby and use media to educate the public and the government on the matters at hand.

Criticism and Controversy

Sahabat Alam Malaysia has seen controversies and criticisms, especially from state government and developers, which often clash over differences in opinions, especially in development projects such as the Pan Island Link, a highway project, and the Penang South Islands project, criticizing the Environmental Impact Assessment (EIA) processes. On the other hand, developers often claim that, in fact, such opposition ignores the need for development and infrastructure, while SAM maintains that they protect sustainability and local communities. Some critics argue that economic growth takes priority over environmental concerns, such as palm oil, an important industry that many rural areas rely on. E-waste import has sparked controversy and conversation regarding the issue in Malaysia, with groups such as Greenpeace seeking to ban it. Regardless of the criticisms, however, Sahabat Alam Malaysia remains an important watchdog in the country. They often fight for the people most affected by these projects and decisions and make sure environmental regulations are not only protected but also potentially expanded, especially in Malaysia, where the country is more at risk from climate change related disasters, which have a bigger impact on indigenous communities than others.

== See also ==
- FoEI
- Third World Network
- Consumers Association of Penang
