= Middle Powers Initiative =

The Middle Powers Initiative (MPI) is a network of international civil society organizations that advocates for the global elimination of nuclear weapons. The program is hosted by the Global Security Institute, a non-governmental organization. MPI works to advance nuclear non-proliferation and disarmament by encouraging governments and policymakers to adopt practical measures toward the reduction and eventual elimination of nuclear weapons. Through MPI, eight international non-governmental organizations are able to work primarily with "middle power" governments to encourage and educate the nuclear weapons states to take immediate practical steps that reduce nuclear dangers and commence negotiations to eliminate nuclear weapons.

Middle power countries are politically and economically significant, internationally respected countries that have renounced the nuclear arms race, a standing that gives them significant political credibility.

The campaign is guided by an International Steering Committee, chaired by Senator Douglas Roche, O.C., former Canadian Disarmament Ambassador.

Currently, the efforts of the Middle Powers Initiative are focused through the Article VI Forum, a new and creative initiative intended to stimulate and shape effective responses to the crisis of the non-proliferation / disarmament regime manifested by the breakdown of the 2005 NPT Review Conference. The Article VI Forum takes its name from the article of the NPT in which the nuclear states commit themselves to the elimination of their nuclear weapons.

The Forum has conducted high-level meetings with key diplomats and leaders to examine the political, legal, and technical elements required for a nuclear weapons-free world.

The Forum has asserted to continue its work of advancing the imperative to uphold the core bargain of the Nuclear Non-Proliferation Treaty relating to the proliferation of nuclear weapons and ensuring steady progress toward their global elimination.
