= Ancestral land conflict in Botswana =

Conflict between Botswana government and bushmen

Ancestral land conflict over the Central Kalahari Game Reserve (CKGR) arose in the 1970s between the government of Botswana and the San people (Bushmen) and is ongoing, resulting in one of the most expensive court cases in the history of Botswana.

In the 1970s, conflict began over the relocation efforts by the government of Botswana (GOB), which ultimately led to some resettlement outside of the reserve in the 1990s. Due to the ongoing struggle between the San people and the GOB over land rights, the "First People of the Kalahari," an organization advocating for the rights of the San people was founded. Debates revolve around whether diamond discovery in reserve, could be the motivation for relocation efforts taken by the government of Botswana. In 2002, the government cut off all services to CKGR residents. A legal battle began, and in 2006 the High Court of Botswana ruled that the residents had been forcibly and unconstitutionally removed. The policy of relocation continued, however, and in 2012 the San people appealed to the United Nations to compel the government to recognize their land and resource rights.

In 2024 Duma Boko, a human rights lawyer that had personally been involved in the legal conflict, became the newly elected president of Botswana, and in March 2025 the new government announced an interministerial committee on the issue, beginning consultations with affected communities. In September 2026, the government approved a land restitution roadmap.

== Background ==
=== San people ===
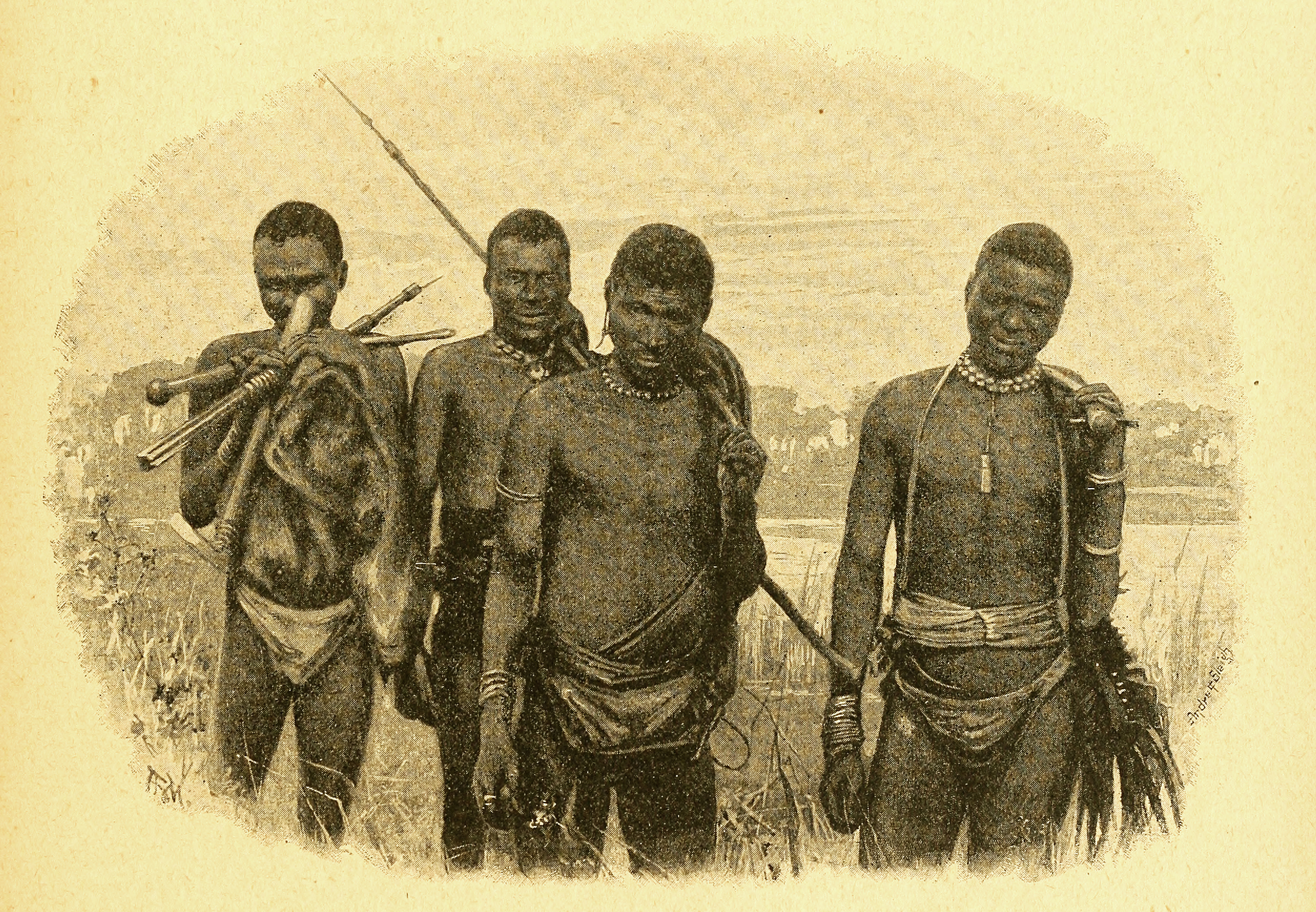
Wandering hunters (Basarwa Bushmen), North Kalahari desert, c. 1892, from a photograph by Henry Anderson Bryden

The San people (or Basarwa, formerly known as "Bushmen"), are one of the oldest cultures on Earth; they have lived in the area around the Kalahari Desert much longer than neighboring tribal groups. Much tribal land in Botswana, including land occupied by the San, was lost during European colonization, and the pattern of loss of land and access to natural resources continued after Botswana's independence. The San have been particularly affected over time by encroachment on the part of majority tribes and non-indigenous farmers onto lands traditionally used by the San. Government policies beginning in the 1970s transferred a significant area of traditionally San land to White settlers and majority agro-pastoralist tribes. Much of the government's policy regarding land tended to favor the dominant Tswana tribe over the minority San and Bakgalagadi peoples. James Anaya, as the Special Rapporteur on the situation of human rights and fundamental freedoms of indigenous people for the United Nations, describes loss of land as a major contributor to many of the problems facing Botswana's indigenous people, citing the San's eviction from the Central Kalahari Game Reserve (CKGR) as an especial example.

=== Central Kalahari Game Reserve ===
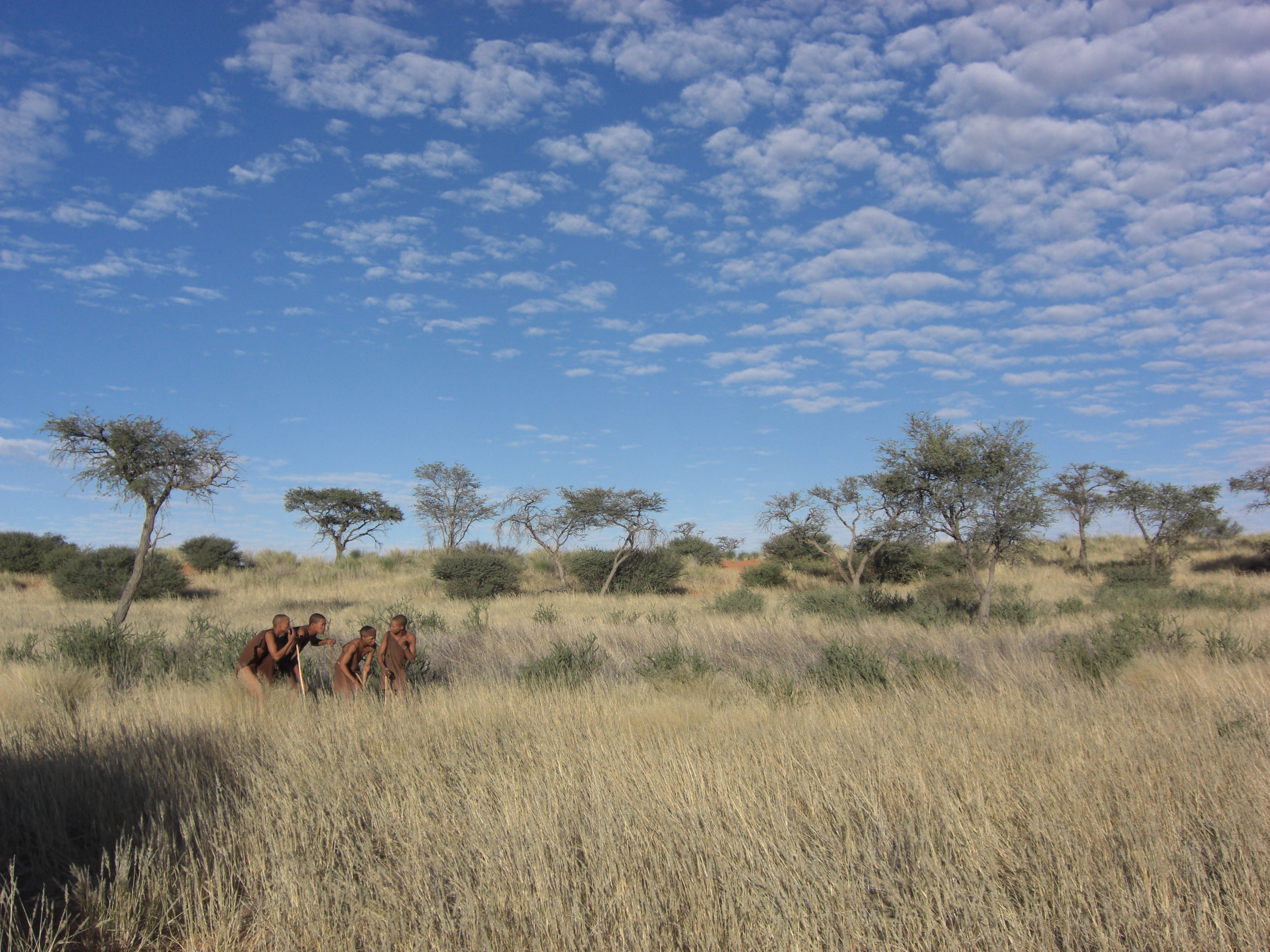
Bushmen in the Kalahari

In the 1950s, there was an increased concern on minority populations in Africa by the United States, South Africa, and Great Britain. They launched investigations and research campaigns to have a more extensive understanding of the problems faced by minority populations in Africa. In Botswana, "there was pressure from some sources for changes in the way the San were treated, with some academics suggesting that the San be given a place of their own." In 1958, the Bechuanaland Protectorate government designated George Silberbauer to perform research and find resolutions to the issues facing the San people. As a result of his investigation, in 1961, the Central Kalahari Game Reserve (CKGR) was established to give the San a place of their own and to protect the surrounding flora and fauna. Although Silberbauer wanted the establishment of a "people reserve", at the time, no law permitted it. However, the CKGR is "unique in that it was created not only as a nature reserve but also to protect the rights of around 5000 people, mostly San, living within its borders, who wanted to maintain their hunter-gatherer lifestyles."

== First People of the Kalahari ==
As an organization to represent and advocate for the San people during its early conflicts, the "First People of the Kalahari," also known as "Kgeikani Kweni," was founded in October 1993 by John Hardbattle, Roy Sesana, and Aron Johannes. The creation of this advocacy organization was the result of the ongoing struggle for minorities' land and resource rights. The San people felt like they needed a representative to voice out their needs and assist with their fight for equal rights in Botswana. Between 1986 and 1989, the San and other minority groups in the CKGR were politically active and founded the Kuru Development Fund, a multipurpose organization with the goal of community development.The Kuru Development Fund critical in the founding of the "First People of the Kalahari," because it provided funding and because it encouraged its founder, John Hardbattle, to represent and advocate for the San.

The "First People of the Kalahari" represented the San people in the First International San Conference in Windhoek and in the Second International San Conference in Gaborone in October 1993. At these conferences, the San spokespersons identified the problems faced by the San, such as "poverty, alienation from land and resources, lack of political representation at the national level, labour exploitation, discrimination, lack of attention paid specifically to San but rather a focus on a bureaucratically defined group known as Remote Area Dwellers, and the Botswana government failure to support land rights, cultural rights and development rights of San peoples." Ultimately, these conferences led to the registration of the "First People of the Kalahari" as a recognized organization with the government of Botswana and the inauguration of their own office in Gaborone in 1994.

"The First People of Kalahari." would ultimately lead the San people to "the largest historical and active resistance" against the government's efforts to relocate them. In 2002, the San People, alongside their representatives, took the government of Botswana to court to fight for their right to remain in the CKGR and access the natural resources within it. Ultimately in 2006, the Botswana High Court acknowledged the right of the San people to reside in the reserve.

== Diamonds and land conflict ==
Today, the economy of Botswana is heavily reliant on diamond exports. With the discovery of diamonds in 1967, they came to account for fifty percent of Botswana's GDP. However, before the discovery of diamonds, Botswana was heavily dependent on agriculture. Botswana was one of the poorest countries in the world, with a GDP per capita of 80 dollars per year. There are claims that the GOB attempts to relocate the San people are motivated by the discovery of diamonds in the Central Kalahari Game Reserve in the late 1980s. Survival International explains that "The reserve's rich diamond deposits have been widely blamed for the government's expulsion of the Bushmen." Others emphasize that GOB arguments for relocating the San people, like development and animal conservation, are contradicted by the government's actions like cutting off the water supply, which prevents their development. In 2002, the president of Botswana, Festus Mogae, argued that the efforts to relocate people from the CKGR had nothing to do with any future mining plans or mining inside the reserve. However, others explain that "diamond mining is now the core of Botswana’s economy...nearly all of Botswana’s advancements in infrastructure, healthcare, and education are the result of diamond revenues.” Additionally, the CKGR is considered to be “the richest diamond-producing area in the world.”

Although the government of Botswana denies the relocation policy to be influenced by the discovery of diamonds in the Central Kalahari Game Reserve, they have also publicly mentioned that "mining rights in Botswana, according to the Constitution, belong to the State regardless of who owns the land." While some believe that diamond discovery could be the reason why the GOB has placed so much efforts for relocating the San people, some argue that discovery of diamonds are not to blame. The claim is that if diamonds were discovered and a mine would have to be established, the amount of land it would need would be minimal, and would not interfere with the lives of the San people.

== Early conflict ==
Although the establishment of the Central Kalahari Game Reserve (CKGR) was intended to protect the rights of minorities, between the 1970s and 1980s, an urge to relocate the San people started. The government of Botswana (GOB) claimed that there was a decline of animals due to overhunting by the San people for their subsistence. There was also the argument that the status of "game reserve" blocked the possibilities of an expansion of services, such as hospitals, schools, and police, available to the populations within the reserve. Although calls for relocation began, no concrete actions were taken.

By the late 1980s, debates on what to do with the San people continued, and tensions rose between the San people and the government, bringing international attention over the rights of the San people. In August 1985, Minister of Commerce and Industry, M.P.K. Nwako, was sent by the GOB to the CKGR to provide a report on the situation and present a solution. With his statement, on July 15, 1986, a White paper was issued stating that the new GOB policy noted that those living within the reserve were to be relocated somewhere else. On October 12, 1986, "the GOB announced that the settlements of its “Remote Area Dweller” (RAD) program, which provided services to the San, among others, would from that point forward be established only outside of the CKGR." The GOB claimed that the relocations would be beneficial for the San because services could be better distributed outside of the reserve since it is difficult to do so inside the reserve. Additionally, the government stated that the San people had to be relocated because they posed a threat to wildlife. However, occupants of the reserve attended what are known as "Kgotla," local council meetings at the Ghanzi township, where they expressed their concerns and, ultimately, were saved from relocating.

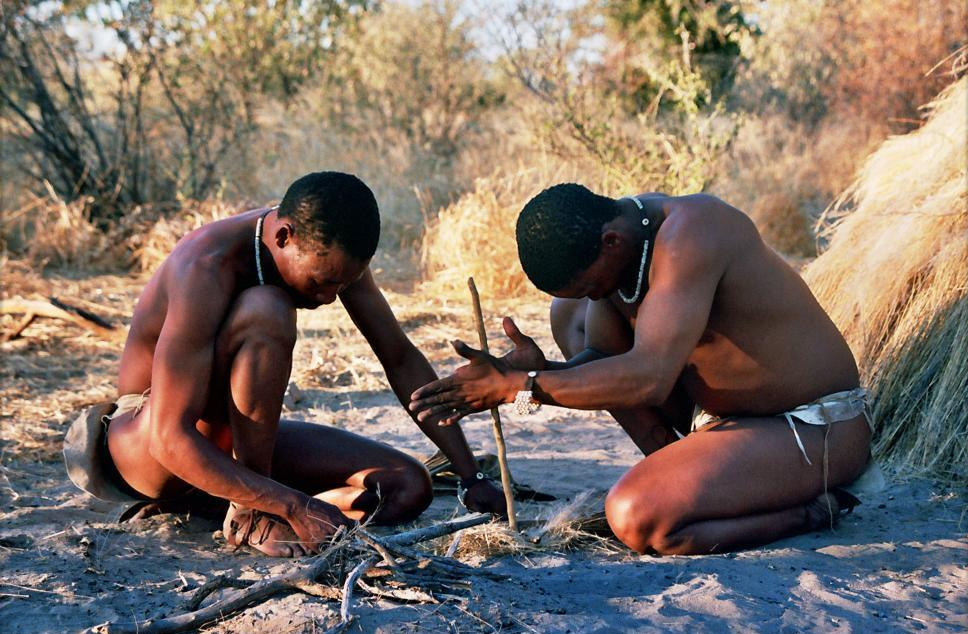
Bushmen (San)

As the GOB continued to find ways to remove the residents of the Central Kalahari Game Reserve, the residents and its foreign supporters, like Survival International and anti-apartheid leaders, found ways to evade the government's relocation efforts. In April 1989, the human rights group, Survival International, took action on behalf of the San people and released an "Urgent Action Bulletin on the issue of the forced relocation of people out of the reserve."Additionally, Survival International and other human rights organizations wrote letters to the GOB, particularly the President's Office and the Ministry of Local Government, Lands and Housing, over their efforts for the San people's resettlement.

In the early 1990s, relocation efforts intensified. The government slowed down the delivery of services to people inside the Central Kalahari Game Reserve, in efforts to push people out on their own. The government would claim that these services would once again be available when they resettled outside the reserve. However, the San were concerned that they would be pushed to resettle in crowded areas where they would continue to struggle over access to services.Some residents did eventually relocate on their own; however, after some time, they returned to the reserve because they claimed that there was not enough land in the new settlement and that there was ongoing competition for the limited resources.

In 1992, a meeting and a workshop, where the San, alongside their representatives, expressed their concerns and the problems they faced over relocation, led to world attention on the issue. The workshop "Sustainable Rural Development hosted on April 13, 1992, in Gaborone, allowed the San to express the problems they faced in Botswana. Additionally, a meeting was organized between the San and the Office and the Ministry of Local Government, Lands and Housing on May 18, 1992, where the San demanded the creation of political structures where they would be represented and have a vote over decisions that would impact them. In response to San demands, the government of Botswana claimed that the San, with foreign support, wished to secede from Botswana.

== Central Kalahari Game Reserve relocations ==
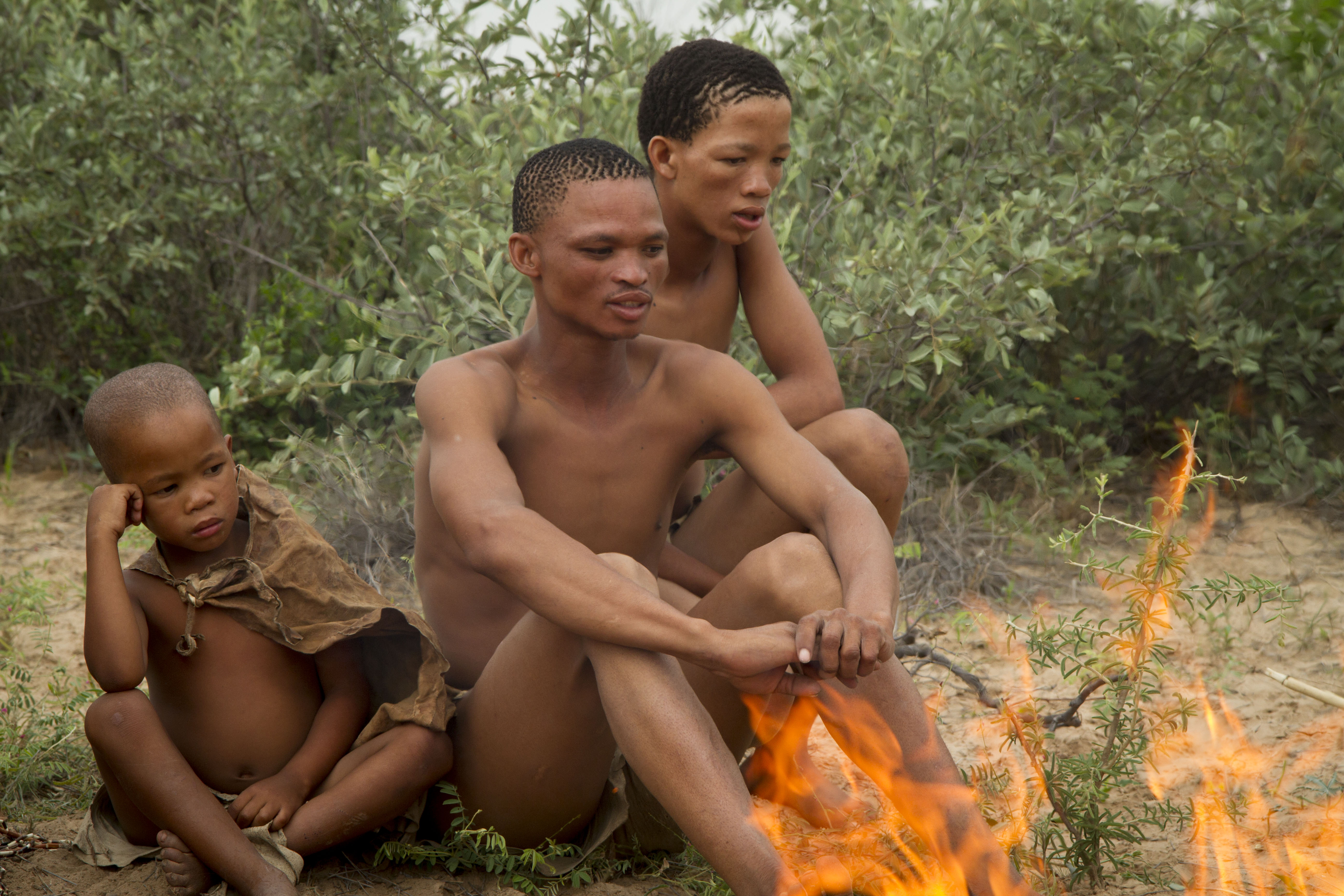
San men in Botswana

The lifestyles of the San and Bakgalagadi residents of the CKGR changed as wells were drilled and a school and health post were established there, which encouraged an agro-pastoralist lifestyle and led to the keeping of some livestock within the reserve. The government determined that the lifestyles of communities within the CKGR were no longer consistent with the aims of the reserve and that providing services within the reserve was too costly to continue. The government therefore decided to relocate all of those living within the CKGR to settlements outside the reserve.

While the government maintains that the relocations were voluntary, Anaya describes the consultation process as "inadequate" and notes "serious concerns" about whether consent to relocate was freely given. In particular, harassment of residents, dismantling of infrastructure, and bans on hunting appear to have been used to induce residents to leave the reserve. A countrywide ban on hunting, announced in January 2014, "effectively ends thousands of years of San culture", according to The Guardian. The government's hunting ban does not apply to private game ranches catering to tourists. In 2002, the government ceased all services to residents of the CKGR, and capped the borehole that had provided water to inhabitants of the reserve.

Since the mid-1990s, the central government of Botswana has implemented a relocation policy aimed at moving the San out of XamKhomani Heartland, their ancestral land on and near the CKGR into newly created settlements such as New Xade. The government's official reason for adopting the policy states:

Over time it has become clear that many residents of the CKGR already were or wished to become settled agriculturists, raising crops and tending livestock as opposed to hunting-gathering when the reserve was established in 1961. In fact, hunting-gathering had become obsolete to sustain their living conditions. These agricultural land uses are not compatible with preserving wildlife resources and not sustainable to be practiced in the Game Reserve. This is the fundamental reason for government to relocate the CKGR residents.

Anaya writes that while some former residents of the CKGR chose not return to the reserve due to a lack of services, including water, those living in the reserve have stated a desire to be able to hunt and gather, since these activities are an important part of their culture. A sense of a deep personal connection to the land in the reserve was evident among both those San living in the CKGR as well as those San and Bakgalagadi who had been resettled outside the CKGR. These latter groups expressed a desire to return to the reserve despite the challenges of living there. Jumanda Gakelebone, a spokesman for the San in Botswana, told The Guardian:

We have survived for millennia in one of the world's driest areas but they treat us as stupid. We are hunter-gatherers yet we get arrested. We cannot damage the wildlife. If we kill one animal we eat it for a month. We are not allowed to hunt but others can.

The human-rights group Survival International quotes Gakelebone as saying:

We are still hunter-gatherers. We want to be recognized as hunter-gatherers. If you say don’t hunt, it means don’t eat. If you are going to ban hunting, you have to consult us. You’re going to turn us into poachers. But hunting for us has never been about poaching. We hunt for food.

The government has denied that any of the relocation was forced. A 2006 ruling by the High Court of Botswana confirmed, however, that residents had been forcibly and unconstitutionally removed. The court held in Roy Sesana and Others v. The Attorney General that the San plaintiffs were, "forcibly or wrongly and without their consent", deprived of possession of land that they lawfully occupied. The judgement noted conflicting and confusing statements and actions by the government. According to Anaya, the case "highlights the failure of the government to adequately consult with indigenous peoples in significant decisions affecting them and to respect their rights to traditional lands and resources".

Opponents of the relocation policy claim that the government's intent is to clear the area—an area the size of Denmark—for the lucrative tourist trade and diamond mining. Government representatives have stated that allowing even small communities to live within the game reserve is incompatible with the reserve's aims of wildlife conservation. Anaya, however, writes that the government's position on this issue appears to conflict with its decision to permit diamond mining by Gem Diamonds within the reserve. The mining operation is planned to last several decades and could involve an influx of 500 to 1200 workers into the reserve, according to the mining company. The government stated that although exploration had taken place, it concluded that diamond mining would not be viable and that the relocation policy had nothing to do with mining. However, in 2014 the Ghaghoo mine, operated by Gem Diamonds, began extracting ore in the Central Kalahari Game Reserve. As stated by the news division of the Rapaport Diamond Report, a diamond-industry pricing guide, "Ghaghoo's launch was not without controversy [...] given its location on the ancestral land of the Bushmen". Survival International director Stephen Corry said that with the mine's opening:

Botswana’s commitment to conservation is window dressing. The government falsely claims that the Bushmen’s presence in the reserve is incompatible with wildlife conservation, while allowing a diamond mine and fracking (hydraulic fracturing) exploration to go ahead on their land.

In 2005, John Simpson of BBC News described the people of New Xade as suffering from drunkenness and sexually transmitted diseases, saying, "When the Botswana government takes foreign guests to New Xade on fact-finding trips, it shows them the showcase schools and clinics which have been built for the Bushmen. The VIP buses take a detour in order to miss the shebeens [bars]." Simpson said he suspected the relocations were partly motivated by plans for diamond mining.

In a 2005 embassy communication released in 2011, United States Ambassador to Botswana Joseph Huggins condemned the forced evictions, saying: "While it is probably the case that two-three years on since the move, the greatest trauma is past, it is also clear that people have been dumped in economically absolutely unviable situations without forethought, and without follow-up support. The lack of imagination displayed on the part of the GOB [Government of Botswana] is breathtaking. The GOB views New Xade as similar to many sites of rural poverty, deserving no special treatment. But the special tragedy of New Xade's dependent population is that it could have been avoided."

== 2006 High Court decision ==
On 13 December 2006, the San won a historic ruling in their long-running court case against the government. According to the San's lawyer Gordon Bennett, "Nobody thought the Bushmen had any rights" before their court victory. "Nobody even cared." The case was decided shortly before the United Nations' Declaration on the Rights of Indigenous Peoples was adopted. Legal scholars Donald K. Anton and Dinah L. Shelton write that the case "exemplfies what some consider a potential conflict between environmental protection and human rights".

By a 2–1 majority, the court ruled the refusal to allow the Basarwa into the CKGR without a permit, and the refusal to issue special game licences to allow the San to hunt, was "unlawful and unconstitutional". It also found that the San were "forcibly and wrongly deprived of their possessions" by the government. Two of the three justices referred to the relative powerlessness of the San, partly as a result of discrimination, that had resulted in low literacy and little to no political or economic power relative to majority tribes. The justices concluded that even voluntary decisions to relocate on the part of the San were not based on informed consent, in light of evidence that the government had not adequately informed the San about compensation or their right to return to the reserve after relocation. The court did not compel the government to provide services, such as water, to any San who returned to the reserve. As of 2006, more than 1,000 San intended to return to the Central Kalahari Game Reserve, one of Africa's largest protected nature reserves.

The government interpreted the ruling narrowly, however, and only limited numbers of San have been allowed to return to this land. The government further required the children and other relatives of the original applicants in the case to obtain permits in order to return to their ancestral land. In April 2008, the United Nations Human Rights Council (UNHRC) criticised Botswana's government for not allowing certain San to return, as well as for denying Bushmen the right to hunt in the reserve, despite their having used the land for hunting for thousands of years.

== High Court appeal ==
A number of San brought a new legal action to reopen the water borehole in the reserve, which was capped in 2002. In 2011 the Court of Appeals awarded the Basarwa (San) the right to reopen or drill new boreholes to gain access to water for domestic use. Prior to the ruling, the government banned the Basarwa from accessing wells, which prevented them from returning home to the CKGR. Following the ruling, the government granted the appropriate permits for workers and machinery to enter the CKGR to drill boreholes. Barrister Gordon Bennett represented the San in court as the judges declared the Botswana government guilty of ‘degrading treatment’ and described the case as ‘a harrowing story of human suffering and despair’. Furthermore, the Government was ordered to pay the costs of the San's appeal. As of 2013, however, the government was still blocking San people's access to water in the CKGR. According to a case study published in June 2012 by Minority Rights Group International, Gope mine owner Gem Diamonds was to work with CKGR residents in order that they would benefit from the mine: the company was to drill four new boreholes, hire residents, and establish a community trust, but only one waterhole had been drilled by year's end.

== 2012–2013 conflict ==
In May 2012 the Basarwa appealed to the UN Permanent Forum on Indigenous Issues, asking the United Nations to force the government to recognize their land and resource rights. The forum approved a set of nine draft recommendations addressing the impact of land seizures and government disenfranchisement of indigenous people. Government relocations continued during the year in the western settlement of Ranyane. In May 2013, the High Court ruled the government must stop the relocation of families from the Ranyane settlement. NGOs reported that the government relocated several families from Ranyane after the High Court ruling and alleged that government officials installed themselves in Ranyane in order to conduct a campaign to induce residents to move from their village, in part by blocking access to the settlement's only water supply.

Survival International reported that some San in Ranyane were slated to be evicted from their ancestral land in order to create a wildlife corridor, known as the Western Kgalagadi Conservation Corridor. Botswana government representative Jeff Ramsay denied any forced eviction plans. A Survival International campaigner said, "I don’t know how the government can say [...] that they are not planning to evict them when the Ranyane Bushmen are taking the government to court to stop from being removed." A new case was filed on behalf of the residents. In response to a complaint filed on behalf of residents, the court issued a restraining order in June 2013 prohibiting the government from relocating residents from Ranyane and from blocking access to the water pipe, entering any household without occupants’ permission, and removing residents without first notifying the community's lawyers.

In August 2013 attorneys for the Basarwa people filed a High Court case in which the original complainants from the 2006 CKGR case appealed to government for unrestricted access to the CKGR for their children and relatives (i.e. without permits). The case was dismissed for technical reasons, with permission given by the court to refile with a new application. In a move criticized by civil society and local media, the government added the Basarwa applicants’ lawyer, a United Kingdom citizen affiliated with Survival International, to a list of individuals who must apply for visas to enter the country. While the government denied allegations that it planned to bar the lawyer from the country, it did not grant his visa in time for him to participate in the August High Court hearing. The lawyer, Gordon Bennett, said, "The right to a fair trial normally includes the right to be represented by counsel of your choice. Not in Botswana, apparently – or at least not if you sue the Government." A Botswana government Facebook post stated that the Department of Immigration had turned down Bennett's request for a visa, describing it as "submitted on short notice" A follow-up Facebook post said that the Minister of Labour and Home Affairs, the Honourable Edwin Batshu, defended this move as being "in the interest of national security." The trial began on 29 July.

== After the 2024 election ==
In 2024, the general election in Botswana led to a victory for the opposition left-wing alliance Umbrella for Democratic Change, unseating the Botswana Democratic Party which had ruled the country with no interruption since independence in 1966.

Its leader, Duma Boko, was elected president. He had previously worked as human rights lawyer and represented the Basarwa in court, and upon taking office, reversed a government decision to implement a decision by the Court of Appeals after which the late Pitseng Gaoberekwe was denied a burial in his ancestral homeland in the Central Kalahari Game Reserve..

In March 2025, Minister of Justice and Correctional Services, Mr Nelson Ramaotwana announced on behalf of Duma Boko's administration an Inter-Ministerial Committee to "comprehensively examine the situation of Basarwa in Botswana, including those in the Central Kalahari Game Reserve (CKGR)" in order "to move the country towards respecting the rights, culture and dignity of Basarwa while fostering national cohesion", reviewing the National Settlement Policy that had been the cause of the relocation of the Basarwa, and its impact on their livelihood, cultural preservation, their land rights and possible return to the reserve. In April, the committee began consultations with affected communities, where many people shared the various economic and social hardships they had experienced since.

He was praised by the UN Special Rapporteur on the Rights of Indigenous People, Albert Barume, for his efforts, and promised Barume government support while his team was operating in Botswana.

In March 2026, Botswana’s Minister of Justice and Correctional Services, Nelson Ramaotwana, said the government was committed to recognizing the right of return of the Basarwa and strengthening their participation in national development. This was followed in September 2026 by the approval of a land restitution roadmap by the government, under which indigenous people of the reserve would gain legally recognized rights and participate in its conservation and management. Mongabay writes that it doesn't answer the question of whether land rights will be collective or tied to individual persons, what laws will change, what shared reserve management will look like for local communities and whether they will get a meaningful part of the revenues generated from tourism and conservation. However, legal protections are promised to enter into force before the next elections in 2029.

== See also ==
- First People of the Kalahari
- San religion
- Kalahari Debate
- Negro of Banyoles
