= Mining industry of Lesotho =

The mining industry of Lesotho is mostly concentrated on diamond mining and as such the mining sector in the country has not played any significant role in furthering its economy. Apart from diamonds, the country's main mineral resources have been identified as base metals, clays, dimension stone, sand, gravel and uranium. The lack of initiative to extract other minerals commercially is mainly attributed to the inadequacy of infrastructure and finances. Between 2000 and 2011, the percentage of GDP contributed by diamond mining to Lesotho's economy rose from "virtually zero" to about 4%.

== History ==
The mining of diamonds started in the country only in the later part of the 1950s. Mining licenses for diamonds from Kao and Liqhobong pipes were operated for a short period from 1959 till Lesotho's independence. Following the independence of the country, the mines were closed due to poor production. In Lesotho's mining history, skilled artisans (known as Basotho diggers) have been extracting diamonds to a large extent under licenses issued in 1961 for the Letseng diamond mine, as well as Kolo, Nqechane and Hololo areas, with a positive impact to the economy of the country. Extraction from the Letšeng diamond pipe, which started in 1968, was not productive and closed in the 1970s. However, these mines were restarted in 2000 and have proved to be productive.

== Production and impact ==
The production of minerals reported is mostly of diamonds, carried out on a commercial basis with international firms. Gem Diamonds of the UK has been an owner of the Letšeng Mine, situated in the Maluti Mountains (about 3,100 metres (10,200 ft) elevation) is said to be the highest mine in the world. Firestone Diamonds Plc and Kopane Diamond Development Plc, both of the UK, have worked the Liqhobong mine. Lucara Diamond of Canada has worked the Mothae mine, while Namakwa Diamonds Ltd. of Bermuda started mining production at Kao mine.

The Department of Mines and Geology has discovered large bodies of Kimberlite intrusion in northern Lesotho. These are reported as 405 kimberline bodies constituted by 30 pipes, 343 dykes, and 23 blows (dyke enlargements), which amounts to one Kimberlite body per 21 square kilometres (8.1 sq mi) area of the country. There are also smaller kimberlite bodies which are found in 1–2 ha areas.

== Legal framework ==
The country has enacted many regulatory laws related to the mining sector, specifically to exploration and issuing of licenses and exports. These laws are; the Mines and Minerals Act 2005; the Precious stones order 1970 on regulations of export, extraction, and all commercial rules related to rough diamonds; the Explosives Proclamation of 1958 (amended) and Mine Safety Act 1981. The country has accepted the Kimberley Process Certification Scheme.

== Commodities ==
Known mineral deposits in Lesotho include base metals, clay, diamond, dimension stone, sand, gravel, and uranium. Artisanal mining concerns of agate, clay, sand, gravel, and stone have occurred to a limited extent for internal consumption. Reserves of bituminous shale and coal have also been identified.

== Bibliography ==
- Survey, Geological (October 2011). Minerals Yearbook, 2009, V. 3, Area Reports, International, Africa and the Middle East. Government Printing Office. ISBN 978-1-4113-2975-1.
