= James Suzman =

Sourh African anthropologist

- Born: Johannesburg, South Africa
- Education: Michaelhouse
- Alma mater: University of St Andrews; University of Edinburgh
- Occupation: Anthropologist
- Notable work: Affluence Without Abundance: The Disappearing World of the Bushmen (2017)
- Relatives: Janet Suzman (aunt); Helen Suzman (great-aunt)

James Suzman is an anthropologist and the author of Affluence Without Abundance: The Disappearing World of the Bushmen published by Bloomsbury in 2017. He is the nephew of Janet Suzman and great-nephew of Helen Suzman. He is based in Cambridge, UK.

== Early life and education ==
Suzman was born in Johannesburg, South Africa, and educated at Michaelhouse. He graduated with an MA (Hons) in social anthropology from the University of St Andrews in 1993. He was awarded a PhD in social anthropology from the University of Edinburgh in 1996.

== Career ==
Suzman was the first social anthropologist to work in Namibia's eastern Omaheke among Southern Ju/'hoansi, where he exposed the brutal marginalisation of San people who had lost their lands to white cattle ranchers and pastoralist Herero people.

In 1998, Suzman was appointed to lead the landmark study "The Regional Assessment of the Status of the San in Southern Africa", based on an ACP/EU resolution.

Suzman later led an assessment by Minority Rights Group International to assess how Namibia's ethnic minorities had fared in the first ten years of Namibian Independence. The subsequent report was published in 2002. Emerging during period of political upheaval in Namibia, it led to calls for the better protection of ethnic minorities in Namibia. The Namibian Government rejected the report's findings and the President, Sam Nujoma, accused Suzman of amplifying "ethnic tensions".

In 2001, Suzman was awarded the Smuts Commonwealth Fellowship in African Studies at the University of Cambridge.

Suzman later established a programme to establish opportunities for Hai//om San to benefit from tourism revenues in Etosha National Park. He was also involved in the dispute that arose as a result of the illegal relocation of Gwi and Gana San from Botswana's Central Kalahari Game Reserve. He was highly critical of the Botswana Government's actions and, later, Survival International's campaign, which he claimed undermined ongoing negotiations between the Botswana Government and a coalition of organisations supporting the evicted San. Survival International, in turn, criticised Suzman and members of the negotiating team led by Ditshwanelo, The Botswana Centre for Human Rights of complicity with the Botswana Government.

In 2007, Suzman joined De Beers, where, as global head of public affairs, he developed the company's award-winning sustainability functions. He resigned in 2013.

In 2013, Suzman and Jimmy Wales teamed up with Lily Cole to launch Impossible.com at the Cambridge Union. In the same year, Suzman was invited to deliver the second Protimos Lecture at the Parliament Chamber of London's Inner Temple.

== Publications ==
Suzman has published widely on San and other issues in academic journals, magazines and newspapers, including The New York Times.

- In 2017, he published Affluence Without Abundance: The Disappearing World of the Bushmen.
- In September 2020, Work: A History of How We Spend Our Time, was published.
- In 2022, Work: A Deep History, from the Stone Age to the Age of Robots was published.
