= Chico Whitaker =

Brazilian architect, politician and theologian (born 1931)

Chico Ferreira
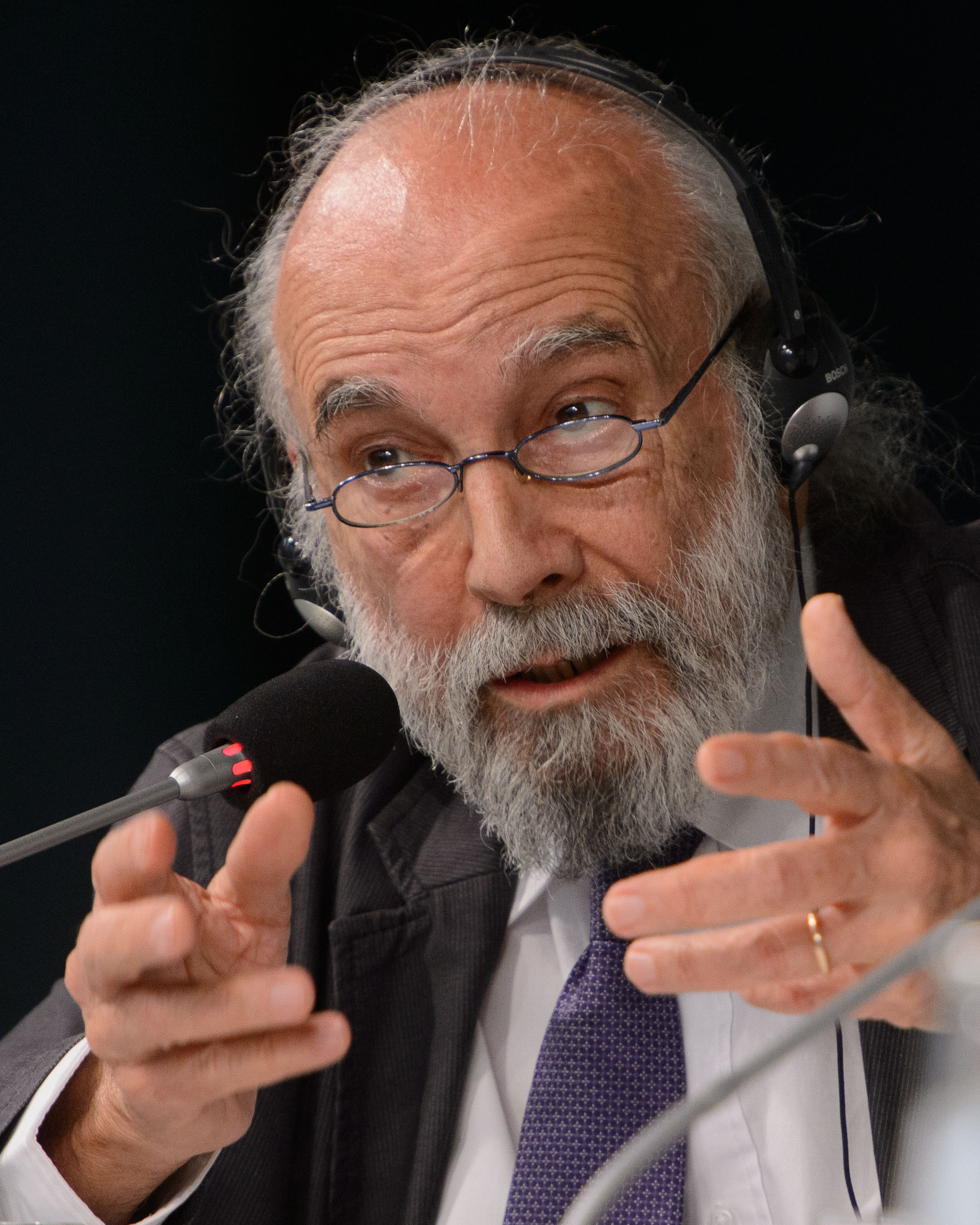
- Whitaker in 2014
- Born: Francisco Whitaker Ferreira; 1931 (age 94–95); São Paulo, Brazil
- Occupations: Architect; politician; activist
- Political party: Workers' Party
- Awards: Right Livelihood Award (2006)

Francisco Whitaker Ferreira (born 1931), also known as Chico Ferreira, is a Brazilian architect, politician, and social activist. A devout Roman Catholic, Whitaker inspires his work in the liberation theology, while maintaining close ties with the Catholic Commission for Justice and Peace, a body linked to the National Conference of Bishops of Brazil. Whitaker served as an alderman for the Workers' Party in the Municipal Chamber of São Paulo from 1989 to 1993, when he acted as the majority leader for mayor Luiza Erundina. He left the party in 2006, and currently serves on the advisory board of the non-profit organization WikiLeaks. He is also a member of the interim consultative committee of the International Organization for a Participatory Society.

== Biography ==
From 1953 to 1954, Whitaker was the chairman of the Catholic University Youth of Brazil, formed by Catholic University students from all over the country. He then served on the strategy group of São Paulo governor Carvalho Pinto, which spanned from 1959 to 1963. He was also head of land reform planning during the João Goulart administration. Following the coup d'état that overthrew Goulart, he joined the opposition movement against the military dictatorship. From 1965 to 1966, he was an advisor of the National Conferences of Bishops of Brazil (Conferência Nacional dos Bispos do Brasil, CNBB) at the First Joint Pastoral Plan. In 1966, fleeing political persecution in the country, he went into live in exile with his wife and four children.

Until his return to Brazil in 1981, Whitaker lived and worked in France and Chile as a researcher and advisor for the Catholic Committee Against Hunger, the United Nations Educational, Scientific and Cultural Organization, and the United Nations Economic Commission for Latin America and the Caribbean, among other organizations. From 1982 to 1988, he served as an advisor for the Archdiocese of São Paulo and the CNBB. In 1988, he was elected to serve in the Municipal Chamber of São Paulo for the Workers' Party. There, he acted as the majority leader for then mayor Luiza Erundina.

In 2001, Whitaker helped organizing the World Social Forum. In 2006, he received the Right Livelihood Award, an annual prize given since 1980 to support people who not only dedicate themselves to social justice and the environment, but who live according to those principles. The prize, €220,000 (around $US285,000), is shared among three other winners, and was awarded in December of that same year. During the local elections of 2008, he helped organizing the Ficha Limpa project, which aims to prevent the candidacy to public offices by citizens responding to legal actions.

In addition to being part of the advisory board of WikiLeaks, Whitaker is also a founding member of the nongovernmental organization Transparência Brasil, which is affiliated to the Transparency International and aims to fight against corruption in Brazil. He also is a member of the World Future Council. The World Future Council brings the interests of future generations to the centre of policy making.

== Publications ==
- 1992: O que é vereador? (in Portuguese) ISBN 85-11-01265-6
- 1994: Idéias para Acabar com os Picaretas (in Portuguese)
- 2005: Desafio do Fórum Social Mundial: um Modo de Ver (in Portuguese) ISBN 85-15-02741-0
- 2006: Towards a New Politics. What Future for the World Social Forum? ISBN 978-1-84277-798-5
- 2007: Eleições, Cidadania e Redes (DVD) (in Portuguese)
- 2007: Das Weltsozialforum: Offener Raum für eine andere Welt (in German) ISBN 978-3-89965-231-4

== See also ==
- Basic ecclesial community

Awards
Preceded by Maude Barlow	Right Livelihood Award; 2006; With: Daniel Ellsberg, the International Poetry; Festival of Medellín, and Ruth Manorama	Succeeded by Dekha Ibrahim Abdi
Preceded by Tony Clarke	Right Livelihood Award; 2006; With: Daniel Ellsberg, the International Poetry; Festival of Medellín, and Ruth Manorama	Succeeded by Louise Schmeiser
Preceded by Irene Fernandez	Right Livelihood Award; 2006; With: Daniel Ellsberg, the International Poetry; Festival of Medellín, and Ruth Manorama	Succeeded by Percy Schmeiser
Preceded by First People of the Kalahari	Right Livelihood Award; 2006; With: Daniel Ellsberg, the International Poetry; Festival of Medellín, and Ruth Manorama	Succeeded by Grameen Shakti
Preceded by Roy Sesana	Right Livelihood Award; 2006; With: Daniel Ellsberg, the International Poetry; Festival of Medellín, and Ruth Manorama	Succeeded by Christopher Weeramantry
Preceded by Francisco Toledo	Right Livelihood Award; 2006; With: Daniel Ellsberg, the International Poetry; Festival of Medellín, and Ruth Manorama	Succeeded by Christopher Weeramantry
