= New Xade =

Village in Botswana

- Village
- Interactive map of New Xade
- Coordinates: 22°07′12″S 22°25′01″E
- Country: Botswana
- District: Ghanzi

Population
  - Total: 1,614

New Xade is a village located in the central part of the Ghanzi District of Botswana. The population was 1,614 in the 2022 census. It was built as a government resettlement camp for the forced relocation of San peoples from the Central Kalahari Game Reserve. beginning in 1997. New Xade is located an hour's drive east of Ghanzi, the nearest town.

== A Relocation Settlement ==
In 1997, 1739 San (Bushmen) and other residents of the CKGR (including the Bakgalagadi) were relocated from the Central Kalahari Game Reserve by the Botswana government as part of the largest resettlement program ever undertaken in the country. 1239 of these relocated to Kg’oesakene (New Xade) and 500 to Kaudwane, outside the southern border of the CKGR in the Kwaneng district. The former settlement, intended to be named Kg'oesakene, meaning “looking for life”, by the residents, has come to be known by its administrative name, New Xade. A further resettlement of Central Kalahari residents took place in 2002. The government justified the relocation in order to conserve natural resources, provide services such as healthcare and education in a more practical manner, and to promote community development amongst the San. New Xade is located about 100 km from Ghanzi, the district capital, and 70 km from Xade, the former settlement in the CKGR for most of the residents. Although the residents were compensated for material possessions such as their huts, livestock and any other infrastructure they left behind, former Xade residents received no monetary remuneration or entitlement to the land they left behind. They did, however, receive plots in the newly created New Xade.

== Ethnic Groups and Languages Spoken ==
There are a variety of ethnic groups present in New Xade. The three primary Khoe groups for which the settlement was created, all of whom were relocated from the Central Kalahari Game Reserve, are the G/ui (Dcuikhoe), G//ana (Dxanakhoe), and the Bakgalagadi. The indigenous languages spoken by these groups are G/ui (Dcui), Gǁana (Dxana), and Sekgalagadi, respectively. With the growing presence of extension workers and nationalized education, Setswana is spoken widely and English fluency is increasing. Literacy, however is low in Setswana and English and nonexistent in G/ui and Gǁana as these languages do not yet have an institutionalized orthography.

With the presence of government extension workers and entrepreneurs, there are also a considerable number of Tswana residents, each with their own dialects, as well as a growing number of Naro residents who have come from neighboring settlements and Ghanzi farms. Most of the children residing in New Xade's primary school hostel speak the Naro language as they belong to the Naro ethnic group which occupies the areas around Ghanzi township and the Ghanzi farming block. Many of the hostel boarders were removed from situations of child labor on the Tswana cattle posts and Boer-owned farms in Ghanzi through the work of Thuto Isago Trust, a child labor and education project based in Ghanzi. It should also be noted that a large number of the Bakgalagadi residents came from Kweneng district to take advantage of entrepreneurial opportunities in the newly created settlement and to live closer to relatives involved in the relocation.

== Effects of the Resettlement ==
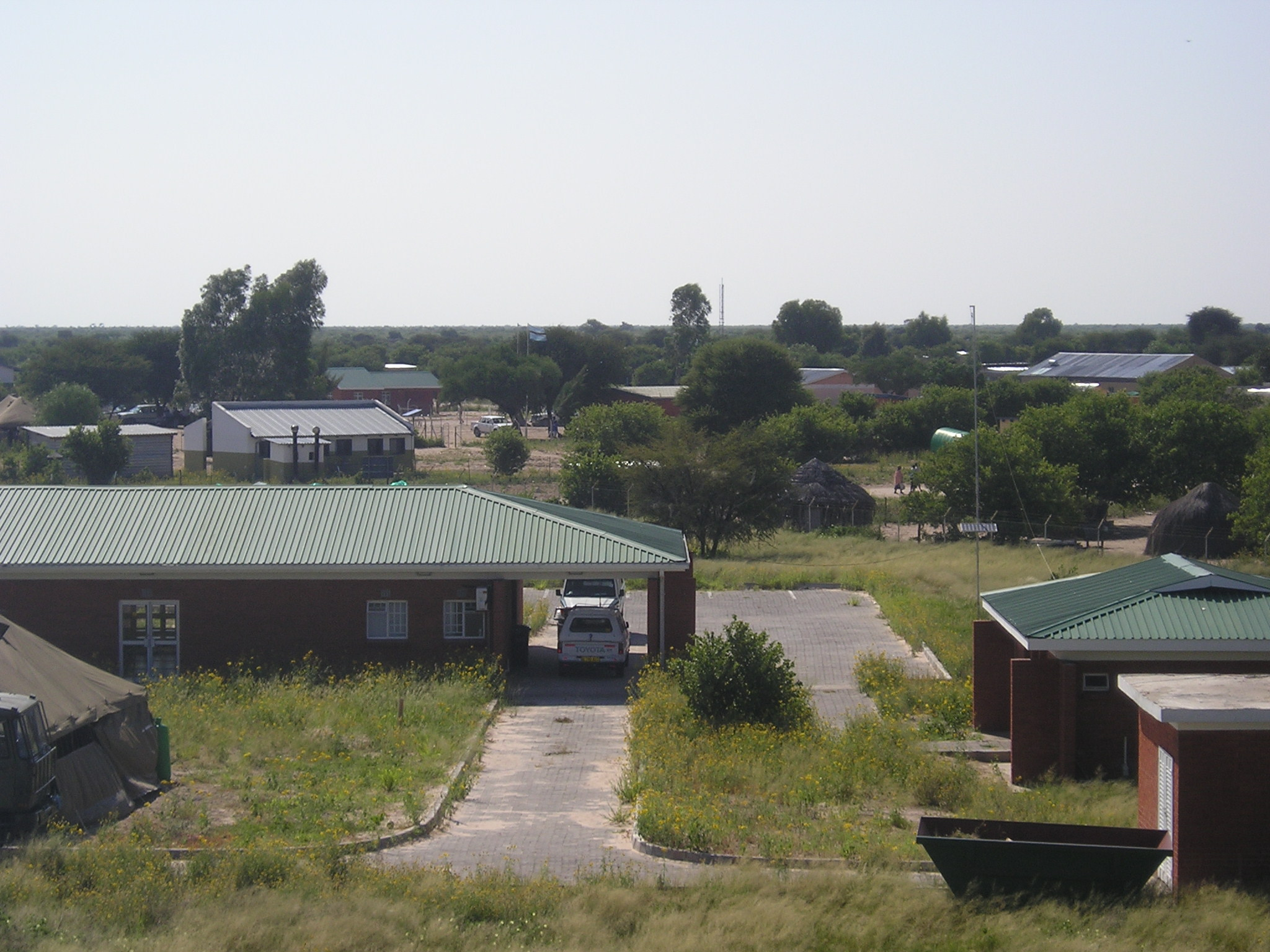
View of New Xade's Clinic

From 2000 to 2001, an anthropological study was undertaken in New Xade by a Japanese anthropologist named Junko Maruyama to determine the impacts of the resettlement on the livelihood and social relationships of the relocates and to demonstrate how the residents have coped with the new situation and environment. At the time of the study, the population of the settlement was estimated to be 1100, consisting mainly of the San from the G/ui and G//ana language groups. The total populations of these two groups in Botswana are about 2350 and 1550, respectively (Cassiday, 2001). Therefore, the settlement contained approximately a quarter of the total G|ui and G||ana population in Botswana in the early 2000s, though that fraction has most likely increased in the past 6 years. It is difficult to know the exact number of people belonging to each ethnic group in the area, because the identity is flexible and inter-ethnic marriage occurs frequently among the G|ui, G||ana, Kgalagadi, and Naro.

According to Maruyama (2003), the lifestyle and residential pattern in New Xade changed drastically. New Xade currently has numerous facilities more typical of a large village in Botswana than a settlement: in the center, there is a large modern clinic and maternity ward (no longer used), primary school, tribal administration and police office, workshop, hostel, adult education center, local craft store, and mini-RAC with offices for Social & Community Development, Culture & Youth, Agriculture, and Rural Area Development Program. The Social and Community Development office currently has a bakery project in New Xade, which sells bread to the primary school once a week. A trailer run by Be-mobile offering internet and computing services was installed in 2012.

According to the research conducted by J. Maruyama, there are two main things that have been changed due to the 1997 resettlement program. First, although the residents’ access to social and economic welfare program improved, their access to natural resources declined significantly. Consequently, people were forced to shift their principal means of livelihood from hunting and gathering to wage labor and agropastoralism. Second, San families ceased to form the camps that had functioned as a production-consumption unit. Furthermore, the residential mobility decreased; they were no longer allowed to move anywhere they liked, as was the custom.

== Relocation Controversy & Court Case ==
Young G/ui boy in New Xade

The Botswana Government's relocation program has contributed to an international controversy fueled by a London-based NGO called Survival International. The protest raised by Survival International (SI) and other international organizations is based on the claim that indigenous peoples worldwide have a right to their ancestral land. These organizations have compared the dispossession of the San in the Kalahari to that of other indigenous peoples by colonial governments in other parts of the world. However, the Botswana government does not accept the concept of “indigenous peoples” and has not ratified international treaties that identify the rights of indigenous and tribal peoples, such as Convention No. 169 of the International Labour Organization. According to SI, even if the San have no legal right to live in the CKGR (which SI does not accept), the San were undoubtedly in possession of their settlements at the date of the relocations. SI argues that the San were deprived of that possession against their free will, and that they are therefore entitled to be restored to their possessions under the doctrine of "spoliation", which formed the basis of SI and First People of the Kalahari’s claims against the Government of Botswana in a landmark court case. Though the court case was decided in December 2006 in favor of the San applicants, it has been argued that the Botswana Government has not followed through with the ruling and is unlawfully preventing the former CKGR residents from returning to their home villages in the CKGR by preventing access to hunting licenses and boreholes for water.

The Botswana Government justified its conduct on various grounds. It has invoked the need to protect the viability of the wildlife population in the Reserve; the prohibitive cost of the provision of basic services to the settlements; and its desire to introduce the San to the mainstream of Botswana society and development.

Survival International has also launched an extensive campaign against the government and the DeBeers Diamond Company claiming that diamond prospecting was one of the primary reasons for the relocation. Though the government denies any such allegations, the campaign has threatened both the tourism and diamond industries of Botswana, its two biggest assets. In May 2007, DeBeers sold its shares in a diamond deposit at Gope (in southeastern CKGR) to Gem Diamonds. In 2008, initial plans were announced to open a mine at Gope through Gem Diamonds Ltd. and tenders were awarded for tourist lodges within the CKGR. One such tender for a planned lodge development at Molapo, a Bushmen community in the CKGR from which many New Xade residents were relocated, was put out by the government and awarded to the Safari Adventure Company, a subsidiary of Wilderness Safaris, a South African business.

The Botswana government has openly and harshly criticized the claims and tactics of SI calling them “a cheap, calculated and malicious use of the San of the Central Kgalagadi as a fundraising gimmick.” Furthermore, the Government has sponsored numerous “fact-finding” missions into the CKGR and resettlement sites for foreign diplomats in an effort to dispel SI's claims.

== Notable residents ==
Roy Sesana: Human rights activist (co-founder of First People of the Kalahari) and winner of the Right Livelihood Award for his work defending the land rights of CKGR residents.

Kuela Kiema: Human rights activist (board member of First Peoples Worldwide) and producer of indigenous music album "Bilo Bilo Heri".

Jumanda Gakelebone: Human rights activist. Spokesperson for First People of the Kalahari.

Kgosi Lobatse Beslag: Current Chief of New Xade. Member of the House of Chiefs. Participated in numerous international tours to defend government relocation policy. Advocates for sustainable income-generation projects in rural settlements.

Councilor Paepae Raseme: Current Councilor of New Xade.
