= John Hardbattle =

John Qace Hardbattle (1945–1996) was one of the best-known Bushman activists in Botswana. "Son of a half-Bushman mother, Khwa, and an English father, Tom Hardbattle". His father was a retired policeman who traveled to South Africa and then Botswana. There he married "Kawi", John's mother. John Hardbattle co-founded (with Roy Sesana) and became leader of the First People of Kalahari (FPK).

== Early life ==
John Hardbattle served in the British army, studied at Oxford University, and farmed cattle in Ghanzi before taking up the cause of Bushman rights.

== First people of the Kalahari ==
Hardbattle co-founded the community organisation First People of Kalahari (FPK) in 1991 with Roy Sesana to spread a simple message: The Central Kalahari Game Reserve belonged to the Bushmen, and they deserved a role in determining their future. FPK soon became a political platform for Botswana's Bushmen facing eviction from their ancestral lands, and who to this day have no representation in Botswana's parliament or in its House of Chiefs.

== Campaign against eviction ==
In an attempt to rectify this and at the same time to fight the coming evictions, John Hardbattle travelled to the UK and the US to alert the international community to the Bushmen's plight and to garner public support for the Bushman cause.

Hardbattle made light of the fact that Botswana's post independence constitution limited entry into the Central Kalahari Game Reserve "for the protection and well-being of Bushmen.” a point he presented to an audience at the United Nations and the international press. Furthermore, Hardbattle alleged that the eviction of the San from their ancestral lands was not about over-hunting, nor was it about development, but was in fact because the Botswana government together with major diamond producers located in Antwerp and Israel, were concerned that FPK would begin to demand a share of any revenue generated through diamond mining in the Kalahari.

Hardbattle generated significant interest and concern for the plight of the San on his trip, attracting support from Gloria Steinem, First Peoples Worldwide, Cultural Survival and Survival International, alongside the publication of a number of articles in the international press. At the same time a number of significant donations were raised for FPK.

As a result of Hardbattle's efforts, the Botswana government was forced to back down from its eviction and resettlement programme.

== Death ==
John Hardbattle died suddenly and unexpectedly of lymphatic cancer in 1996 at the end of his brief campaign. Following his death, the Botswana Government resumed its efforts to forcibly remove and relocate the San people from the Central Kalahari Game Reserve. Hardbattle's work has been continued variously by his long-time friend Roy Sesana and his sister Andrea Hardbattle.
