= Marika Hanbury-Tenison =

English journalist, cookery writer and explorer (1938–1982)

Marika Hanbury-Tenison at table

Marika Hanbury-Tenison (1938–1982) was an English journalist, cookery writer, and explorer.

== Early life ==
Born in London, in 1938, she was the daughter of John and Alexandra Hopkinson. She never had any formal domestic science training, but was interested in food from an early age, and learned cooking mainly by trial and error.

== Life with an explorer ==
In 1959, at the age of twenty, she married the Cornish explorer Robin Hanbury-Tenison, and lived with him in a 14th-century farmhouse on Bodmin Moor. They had two children, Lucy (b. 1960) and Rupert (b. 1970). Her husband was often away on expeditions, and Marika turned to writing in his absence. She began by finding a job as a £1-a-week cookery writer for a local paper, and over the next fifteen years wrote thirty cookbooks and numerous magazine articles. She was cookery editor of the Sunday Telegraph from 1968 until her death in 1982, and also appeared frequently on Westward Television.

In 1971, while still in pain from a serious illness following the birth of her son by Caesarean section, Marika Hanbury-Tenison accompanied her husband on a three-month expedition, backed by Survival International, to visit and live among the Xingu people in Brazil, speaking with local people and studying their living conditions. After returning to England, Marika wrote For Better, For Worse: To the Brazilian Jungles and Back Again (1972), which was published in the United States with the title Tagging Along.

In 1973, the Hanbury-Tenisons followed up their journey to Brazil with a three-month visit to one to the islands of Indonesia. Marika visited about a dozen tribes, taking tea with former cannibals, swimming through swollen rivers, being attacked by leeches, surviving a shipwreck, and becoming ill and exhausted. She wrote about the experience in A Slice of Spice, published in 1974.

The Hanbury-Tenisons made their last research trip together in 1977, when they visited Malaysia as part of a Royal Geographical Society scientific expedition. Shortly afterwards, Marika was diagnosed with cancer. She died in 1982, at the age of forty-four.

== Works ==
- Deep-Freeze Cookery (1970) ISBN 0-261-63203-5
- Left Over for Tomorrow (1971) ISBN 0-140-46165-5
- For Better, For Worse (1972) ISBN 978-1-59048-205-6
- A Slice of Spice (1974) ISBN 978-1-59048-204-9
- Deep Freeze Sense (1976) ISBN 0-330-24652-6
- Deep Freezing (1979) ISBN 0-340-22257-3
- Cooking with Vegetables (1980) ISBN 0-224-01597-4
- Princess and the Unicorn (1982) ISBN 978-0-583-30474-0
- A Boy and a Dolphin (1983) ISBN 0-246-11930-6
- The Fish Recipe Book (1983) ISBN 0-85941-538-4
