= Joels Drift =

Town in Lesotho

- Town
- Location within Lesotho
- Coordinates: 28°42′S 28°17′E
- Country: Lesotho
- District: Butha-Buthe
- Time zone: UTC+2:00 (SAST)

Joels Drift is a town in Lesotho, situated approximately 20 km northeast of Butha-Buthe and 140 km from Maseru. It is also about 80 km southwest of Lesotho's border with South Africa.
