= Conrad Gorinsky =

Guyanese chemist (1936–2019)

Conrad Gorinsky (March 7, 1936 – August 18, 2019) was a Guyana-born chemist who studied in the UK. The son of Cesar Gorinsky, a Polish cattle rancher and gold prospector, and Nellie Melville, a half-Atorad tribeswoman. He spent months with the Amazonian Wapishana tribe and later obtained US patents for tipir and cunani, two chemicals derived from plants used by the tribe. In 1968 he travelled on a BBC-funded expedition in the Amazon with the explorer Robin Hanbury-Tenison, having a discussion with him that led to the foundation of Survival International.

== Patent controversy ==
=== Rupununine ===
Gorinsky patented tipir as rupununine (after the nearby Rupununi river), which is an antipyretic derived from the Greenheart tree. His patent claims it may be used to treat malaria and cancer.

The Wapishana tribe grind this nut and use it to stop bleeding and as an abortifacient which provokes miscarriage. They wanted the patent rescinded, but Gorinsky replied:

"Tough, isn't it?", he says. "I was not the only person looking at the greenheart. I just picked up a nut and said 'what can I do with this?'. I have analysed the chemical structure but I have not patented the tree or a life process. How can I tell the Wapishana about the science? They just inherited the greenheart. They don't own it. I have invested in this with my own money".

=== Cunaniol ===
Gorinsky was one of several who isolated a potent chemical from certain plants that the tribe used for fishing. The natives called the plant cunani, after which Gorinsky called the chemical "cuaniol". Affected by this potent neurotoxin, fish in the surrounding area become disoriented and can easily be caught. Gorinsky patented the use of cunaniol for the treatment of heart disease. The chemical is also known as ichthyothereol.

=== Controversy ===
The 1992 Convention on Biological Diversity, as part of its aim of protecting the knowledge of forest tribes from exploitation, nationalised plant resources and forbid individuals from patenting organic compounds from them. Tribespeople accused him of committing biopiracy by stealing their secrets.
