= Sekhobe =

- Community Council
- Geographic Center of Community
- Coordinates: 28°55′39″S 28°35′46″E
- Country: Lesotho
- District: Butha-Buthe District
- Elevation: 10,259 ft (3,127 m)

Population (2006)
  - Total: 3,874
- Time zone: UTC+2 (CAT)
- Coordinates computed from Lesotho Villages file.

Sekhobe is a community council located in the Butha-Buthe District of Lesotho. Its population in 2006 was 3,874.

== Villages ==
The community of Sekhobe includes the villages of Ha Lehloare, Ha Maphale, Ha Moetsuoa (Kutu-Kutu), Ha Sekhobe (Motete), Kopanong, Lemphane, Liqalaneng, Liqhobong, Liteleng, Manganeng, Maoelaoela, Maphepheng, Patuoe (Motete), Phokojoe-Khoaba, Pulane, Sebebeng, Setonong and Thoteng (Motete).
