= Likila =

- Community Council
- Geographic Center of Community
- Coordinates: 28°43′27″S 28°24′21″E
- Country: Lesotho
- District: Butha-Buthe District
- Elevation: 5,308 ft (1,618 m)

Population (2006)
  - Total: 19,340
- Time zone: UTC+2 (CAT)
- Coordinates computed from Lesotho Villages file.

Likila is a community council located in the Butha-Buthe District of Lesotho. Its population in 2006 was 19,340.

== Villages ==
The community of Likila includes the villages of:

- 'Maeneng
- Basieng
- Bochabane
- Bohataneng
- Boiketlo
- Europe
- Ha Bafokeng
- Ha Bokoro
- Ha Botilo
- Ha Chaba
- Ha Hlasoa (Tsime)
- Ha Katamelo
- Ha Khabele
- Ha Lebesa (Sehleke)
- Ha Lebetla
- Ha Lebetla (Maforeng)
- Ha Lefera
- Ha Lekopa

- Ha Letlala
- Ha Maloi
- Ha Manana (Ha Chaba)
- Ha Mantseiseng
- Ha Maphalala
- Ha Marakabei
- Ha Maseretse
- Ha Mashoba
- Ha Mashopha
- Ha Mashopha (London)
- Ha Molibetsane
- Ha Mosikela
- Ha Mpepe
- Ha Mphahlela
- Ha Mpharoane
- Ha Nchee (Phahameng)
- Ha Paramente
- Ha Pataka

- Ha Ramohapi
- Ha Ranakeli (Tsime)
- Ha Rasekila
- Ha Seboche
- Ha Sekhonyana (Tetete)
- Ha Tabolane
- Ha Tlali (Phahameng)
- Ha Tumane
- Hleoheng
- Joala-Boholo
- Khukhune
- Koung
- Letobong
- Liphakoeng
- Liseleng
- Litaung
- Mabaleng
- Mahlabatheng

- Makeneng
- Mankising
- Marabeng
- Masere
- Matsoapong
- Matumeng
- Mochaoane
- Paballong
- Phamistone
- Sekhutlong
- Sekokong
- Senkhane
- Sheeshe
- Taung
- Thaba-Boqele
- Thaba-Kholo
- Thabong
