= Stephen Corry =

British indigenous rights activist

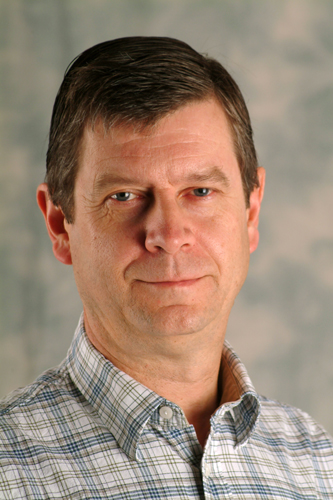
- Born: 1951 (age 74–75); Malaysia
- Citizenship: British
- Known for: Indigenous rights activist
- Scientific career
- Fields: Anthropology; Human rights
- Workplaces: Survival International; Free Tibet Campaign

Stephen Corry (born 1951) is a British indigenous rights activist, best known for being the former CEO of Survival International. In 1993, he became the chairman of the Free Tibet Campaign and remains on its board.

== Biography ==
Stephen Corry was born in Malaysia in 1951. He won a scholarship to Gresham's School and at 16 he left school with the desire to travel and learn other languages.

In 1972, he founded together with Robin Hanbury-Tenison the organisation Survival International. Influenced by his travels, and authors such as Jiddu Krishnamurti, he quit the University of Paris, Jussieu, and volunteered. After becoming a member, Corry sought to go to Brazil to study the indigenous people there, but was asked to stay in London and do research.

Stephen Corry later became Projects Director of Survival International. He had started his work with Survival with the ambitious intention of compiling a World Red Book of Threatened Peoples – parallel to the IUCN's "Red Book of Threatened Species", an idea which was proposed to him by Robin Hanbury-Tenison, while discussing his future role in Survival International. In 1974, he spent nine months in Colombia researching the situation of the indigenous tribal peoples and setting up several projects for funding by the Joint Projects Committee. On his return, in 1976, he published his report, "Towards Indian Self-determination in Colombia." From 1984 until 2021, he was Director-General of Survival International.

== Awards ==
Survival International was awarded the Right Livelihood Award in 1989. Corry gave the acceptance speech.

== See also ==
- David Maybury-Lewis
- Davi Kopenawa Yanomami
- Roy Sesana
