= 'Moteng =

- Community Council
- Geographic Center of Community
- Coordinates: 28°47′00″S 28°29′43″E
- Country: Lesotho
- District: Butha-Buthe District
- Elevation: 7,930 ft (2,417 m)

Population (2006)
  - Total: 16,838
- Time zone: UTC+2 (CAT)
- Coordinates computed from Lesotho Villages file.

'Moteng is a community council located in the Butha-Buthe District of Lesotho. Its population in 2006 was 16,838.

== Villages ==
The community of 'Moteng includes the villages of Bela-Bela, Boinyatso, Bokong (Khaphamali), Ha Hlakacha, Ha Khanye, Ha Lelala, Ha Lesiba, Ha Machefu, Ha Maieane, Ha Matela, Ha Moiloa, Ha Mokone, Ha Molapo, Ha Molumo, Ha Motapane, Ha Moteoli, Ha Mpotla, Ha Nkota, Ha Phakela, Ha Potomane, Ha Ramahotetsa, Ha Sekete (Paballong), Ha Taetsi, Ha Tlebere, Ha Tsolonyane, Khalikana, Khatleng, Khorong, Khubetsoana, Kolone, Lekhalong, Letsoana, Linotšing, Luma, Machubilane, Maholeng, Makareng, Makeneng, Marabeng, Marati, Maseru (Moteng), Mashapi, Masianokeng, Masoleng, Matebeleng, Mathebe, Mota Rifa, Motahane, Muela, Naleli, Nchekoane, Nyakoaneng, Ordendal, Palehong, Phahameng, Phahleng, Phatlalla, Phelandaba, Phohlane, Phomolong, Pote, Qobella, Sebataolong, Sentelina, Setlakalleng and Thabana-Tšooana.
