= Affluence Without Abundance =

2017 book by James Suzman

Affluence without Abundance
- First edition (US)
- Author: James Suzman
- Subject: Anthropology
- Published: 2017 (Bloomsbury)
- Pages: 320
- ISBN: 978-1-63286-572-4

Affluence without Abundance: The Disappearing World of the Bushmen is a book by anthropologist James Suzman on the Bushmen of southern Africa based on his 25 years of experience in the field.

== See also ==
- Original affluent society
