= Oren Ginzburg =

French-Israeli writer

Oren Ginzburg is a French-Israeli writer. He was the director of the Access to Health Fund in Yangon, Myanmar, and is now the UNOPS director of business and digital transformation in Copenhagen. He has written several books, including There You Go!.

== Early life ==
Ginzburg studied law in Grenoble and then attended the École supérieure de commerce in Paris.

== NGO work ==
Ginzburg worked for a decade at Save the Children and then joined the Global Fund to Fight AIDS, Tuberculosis and Malaria. As of 2018, he was directing the Three Millennium Development Goal (3MDG) Fund in Myanmar and living in Yangon. He then became director of the Access to Health Fund, a project aimed at improving healthcare in Myanmar. This followed on from 3MDG.

== Writer ==
Ginzburg is also a writer and cartoonist. His book There You Go! was published by Survival International. It concerns officials who intend to bring sustainable development to an unnamed tribe, but only bring them misery. Christine Hogan writes "In There You Go!, Ginzburg challenges the arrogant assumption that Westerners can teach 'sustainable development' to tribal people by introducing (imposing) impractical and short-sighted 'income-generating' projects which ultimately lead to economic collapse of the environment or bare-faced theft of mineral, timber, and other resources by companies from the outside." It was later adapted into a two-minute film.

The Hungry Man (2004) "follows an unnamed and earnest-faced bespectacled male development worker teaching the eponymous hungry man how to improve his lot" ("The Power of Good Satire", The Fiji Times 2022 ).

Le destin (presque) timbré d'Etienne Durillon (2016) was reviewed in Libération and was awarded the Deutsch-Französischer Jugendliteraturpreis in 2018.

== Selected works ==
- Le destin (presque) timbré d'Etienne Durillon (2016)
- Le Comptable et la Fourmi (1999)
- The Hungry Man (2004)
- There You Go! (2006)
- Giftless (2008)
- The Explorers (2013)
- A PowerPoint Funeral Oration (2015)
