= Letseng diamond mine =

Diamond mine in Lesotho

Letšeng Diamond Mine
- Location within Lesotho
- Location: Lesotho; 29°0′01″S 28°51′43″E
- Products: diamonds
- Type: diamond

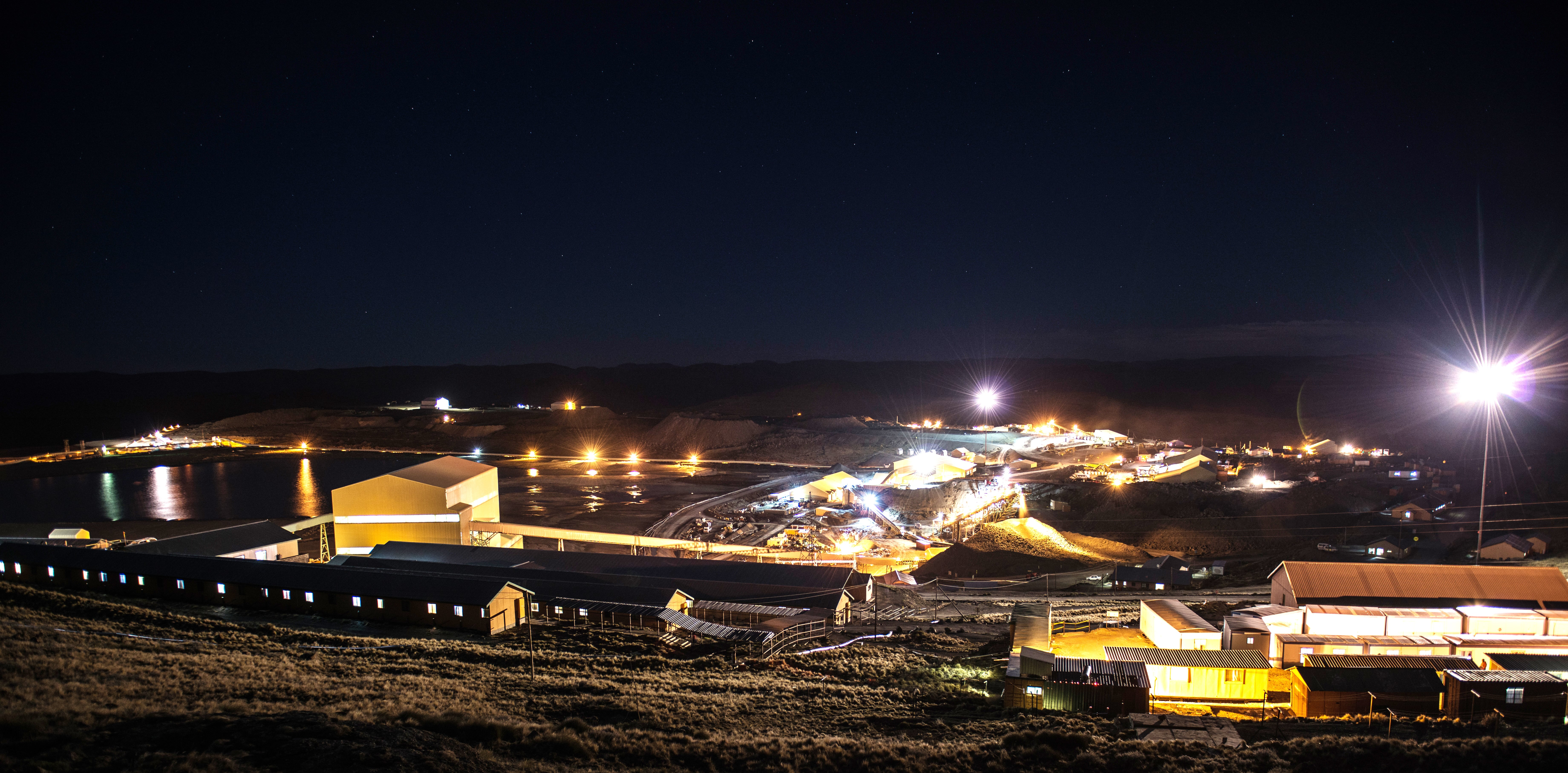
Letšeng Diamond Mine at Letšeng-la-Terae, Mokhotlong, Lesotho

The Letšeng Diamond Mine, found in the landlocked Southern African kingdom of Lesotho, is owned by Gem Diamonds, Ltd. and the government of Lesotho, at an elevation of 3,100 m (10,200 ft) it is the world's highest diamond mine.

== Production ==
It is characterised by extremely low grade ore (less than 400 milligrams (2 carats)/hundred tons) and is known for producing huge diamonds, having the highest percentage of large diamonds (greater than 2 grams (10 carats)), giving it the highest dollar value per carat of any diamond mine. The world average is roughly US$81 per carat, while Letšeng averaged over US$1,894 per carat for the first six months of 2007.

Unusual for Africa, and due to the elevation, temperatures at the mine drop to -20 °C, and snowfalls are common in winter.

== Geography ==
=== Climate ===
Letšeng has a cold subtropical highland climate (Köppen: Cwc), bordering on a dry-winter subarctic climate (Dwc). This means that Letšeng has a chilly climate with fairly cool temperatures throughout the year, even for Lesotho, and snowfalls can happen as well. The average annual temperature is 6.7 °C (44.1 °F), the average annual high temperature is 12.1 °C (53.8 °F) and the average annual low temperature is 1.7 °C (35.1 °F). The warmest month, January, has an average temperature of 11.3 °C (52.3 °F) and an average high temperature of 16.0 °C (60.8 °F). The coldest month, July, has an average temperature of 0.5 °C (32.9 °F) and an average low temperature of −4.6 °C (23.7 °F).

Letšeng has an average annual precipitation of 1,440 millimetres (57 in). However, like most of Lesotho and South Africa, this is not evenly distributed throughout the year. Letšeng has a wet season with abundant rainfall from October to March and a dry season with less precipitation from May to August - the coldest time of year. In terms of precipitation April and October serve as transitions between the wet and dry seasons. January is the wettest month, receiving 299 millimetres (11.8 in) of precipitation on average, while August is the driest month, receiving only 18 millimetres (0.71 in) of precipitation on average.

Climate data for Letšeng-la-Terae (normals 1991-2020)
Month	Jan	Feb	Mar	Apr	May	Jun	Jul	Aug	Sep	Oct	Nov	Dec	Year
Mean daily maximum °C (°F)	16.0 (60.8)	15.6 (60.1)	14.4 (57.9)	11.5 (52.7)	9.2 (48.6)	7.0 (44.6)	6.7 (44.1)	8.5 (47.3)	12.2 (54.0)	13.8 (56.8)	14.7 (58.5)	15.7 (60.3)	12.1 (53.8)
Daily mean °C (°F)	11.3 (52.3)	11.0 (51.8)	9.6 (49.3)	6.5 (43.7)	3.4 (38.1)	0.8 (33.4)	0.5 (32.9)	2.4 (36.3)	6.0 (42.8)	8.1 (46.6)	9.4 (48.9)	10.8 (51.4)	6.7 (44.0)
Mean daily minimum °C (°F)	7.1 (44.8)	6.8 (44.2)	5.2 (41.4)	1.9 (35.4)	−1.7 (28.9)	−4.2 (24.4)	−4.6 (23.7)	−3.1 (26.4)	-0.0 (32.0)	2.6 (36.7)	4.1 (39.4)	6.1 (43.0)	1.7 (35.0)
Average precipitation mm (inches)	299 (11.8)	217 (8.5)	155 (6.1)	74 (2.9)	33 (1.3)	20 (0.8)	18 (0.7)	47 (1.9)	51 (2.0)	145 (5.7)	163 (6.4)	218 (8.6)	1,440 (56.7)
Average precipitation days	17	14	13	8	4	2	2	4	6	12	13	16	111
Average relative humidity (%)	76	75	74	70	63	55	53	52	50	61	65	71	64
Mean monthly sunshine hours	251.1	221.2	235.6	228.0	248.0	246.0	266.6	275.9	285.0	282.1	279.0	272.8	3,091.3
Source: Climate-data.org (sun 1999-2019)

== Significant diamond finds ==
=== Lesotho Promise ===
On 4 October 2006 the 120.6 grams (603 carats) white diamond, the Lesotho Promise was unearthed, which until the January 2018 discovery noted below was the largest reported find this century; at the time it was found it was the 15th largest diamond ever found. The stone is of an exceptional colour, rated D, the top colour for diamonds.

=== Lesotho Brown ===
Previously the largest diamond found at Letšeng was the 120.2 grams (601 carats) Lesotho Brown, recovered in 1967.

=== Letšeng Legacy ===
On 13 September 2007 Gem Diamonds, Ltd. announced that it had found a 98.654 grams (493.27 carats) diamond, making it the 18th largest diamond ever found. It was sold to the Graff-SAFDICO partnership for $10.4 million.

=== Star of Lesotho ===
In 2004, Gem Diamonds, Ltd. found a large diamond of 24.6 grams (123 carats).

=== Leseli La Letšeng ===
On 21 September 2008 Gem Diamonds, Ltd. announced that it found a 95.6 grams (478 carats) diamond of high quality, making it the 20th largest diamond ever found. It is a type II D colour, with potential to yield a 30 grams (150 carats) cut stone. Chief executive Clifford Elphick said: "Preliminary examination of this remarkable diamond indicates it will yield a record-breaking polished stone of the very best colour and clarity, and has no inclusions visible in its rough form."

=== November 2010 ===
The discovery of two large rough white diamonds was announced in November 2010. They weighed 39.2 grams (196 carats) and 36.8 grams (184 carats).

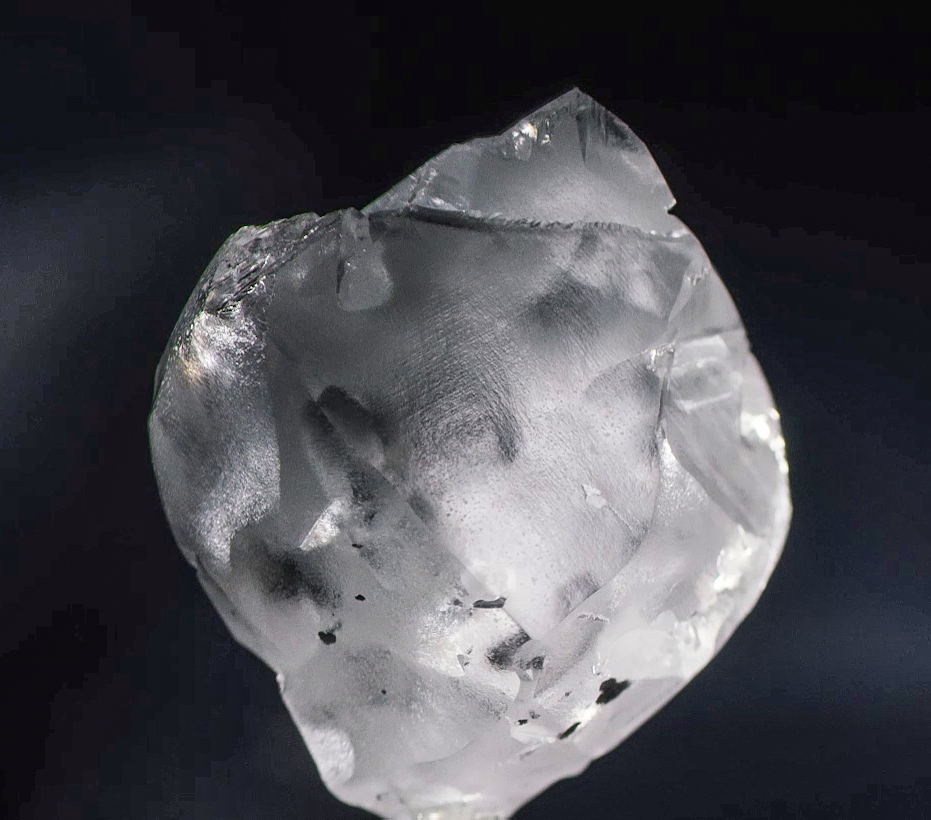
The Lesotho Legend, the 910-carat diamond recovered in January 2018

=== Lesotho Legend ===
In January 2018 Gem Diamonds announced the largest diamond yet discovered at Letšeng, a Type IIa D color stone measured at 182 grams (910 carats). It sold in March 2018 for $40 million. The same year a light brown diamond of 357.61 carats was discovered.

=== Letšeng Star ===
In August 2011 a diamond of 110 grams (550 carats) was found.

=== Letšeng Dynasty and Letseng Destiny ===
In May and July 2015, the discovery of two large diamonds was announced : the Letšeng Destiny of 62.8 grams (314 carats) and the Letšeng dynasty of 71.4 grams (357 carats).

== See also ==
- Mining industry of Lesotho
- List of largest rough diamonds
- List of diamonds
