= Makhunoane =

- Community Council
- Geographic Center of Community
- Coordinates: 28°38′36″S 28°28′36″E
- Country: Lesotho
- District: Butha-Buthe District
- Elevation: 7,749 ft (2,362 m)

Population (2006)
  - Total: 8,085
- Time zone: UTC+2 (CAT)
- Coordinates computed from Lesotho Villages file.

Makhunoane is a community council located in the Butha-Buthe District of Lesotho. Its population in 2006 was 8,085.

== Villages ==
The community of Makhunoane Community Council includes the villages of Benoni, Benteke, Bochabela, Boithero, Ha Balimo, Ha Heshe, Ha Janki, Ha Lekula, Ha Lenela, Ha Lepatoa, Ha Mafusing, Ha Maqetela, Ha Masilo, Ha Mohloai, Ha Morake, Ha Moruti, Ha Mosoang, Ha Motsapi, Ha Mou, Ha Mphatsela, Ha Ntereke, Ha Poosho, Ha Potjo, Ha Qaqana, Ha Ramatlung, Ha Seapi, Ha Sejakane, Ha Tae (Thoteng), Ha Thabe, Ha Thaka-Banna, Ha Tsoenyane, Jabavu, Kolone, Letlapeng, Letša-Lea-Luma, Lihlabeng, Macheseng, Mahlabatheng, Makhunoane, Masenkeng, Matsikeng, Mokhujoaneng, Mokoetlaneng, Mokotjela, Moqomong, Phamong, Phoku, Ropa, Sheeshe, Thabong, Tholong and Tšepong.
