= Lipelaneng =

- Community Council
- Geographic Center of Community
- Coordinates: 28°45′12″S 28°15′29″E
- Country: Lesotho
- District: Butha-Buthe & Leribe
- Elevation: 5,810 ft (1,771 m)

Population (2006)
  - Total: 30,320
- Time zone: UTC+2 (CAT)
- Coordinates computed from Lesotho Villages file.

Lipelaneng is a community council located in the Butha-Buthe and Leribe Districts of Lesotho. Its population in 2006 was 30,320.

== Villages ==
The community of Lipelaneng includes the villages of Baroeng, Botha-Bothe Reserve, Ha Kamoho, Ha Koabeng (Mabothile), Ha Lekhooana (Matebeleng), Ha Lekili, Ha Majara, Ha Makakamela (Ha Rampai), Ha Maletatso, Ha Mapape (Mekhotlong), Ha Mokete, Ha Mokhoka, Ha Mopeli, Ha Morathaba, Ha Mothetsi, Ha Nqabeni, Ha Qoati, Ha Ramokema, Ha Sebeko, Ha Sechele, Ha Sepetla, Ha Serole, Ha Shepeseli, Ha Shepheseli, Ha Thabo (Liqalaneng), Khapung, Lerallaneng, Likhefing, Likhutlong (Mahlabatheng), Likileng, Likoting, Lipelaneng, Liqalaneng, Lithakong, Mabothile, Maholeng, Majakaneng, Makong, Makopo, Mamohololi, Maoeng, Marallaneng, Masaleng, Masheeng, Matebeleng, Moholokohlong (Matlakeng), Mokhanthane, Morifi, Paballong (Motse-Mocha), Peqeng (Matlakeng), Phahama, Phahameng, Phaphama, Qaphaulane, Sekoting, Tarabane, Taung (Ha Rampai), Thabana-Mokhele, Thabong, Thata-Moli, Thotaneng (Matlakeng), Thoteng (Ha Shepeseli) and Tlokoeng.
