= Ntelle =

- Community Council
- Geographic Center of Community
- Coordinates: 28°41′23″S 28°30′34″E
- Country: Lesotho
- District: Butha-Buthe District
- Elevation: 8,478 ft (2,584 m)

Population (2006)
  - Total: 5,233
- Time zone: UTC+2 (CAT)
- Coordinates computed from Lesotho Villages file.

Ntelle is a community council located in the Butha-Buthe District of Lesotho. Its population in 2006 was 5,233.

== Villages ==
The community of Ntelle includes the following villages:

- Ha 'Mantlobo
- Ha Bulara
- Ha Jane
- Ha Katsi
- Ha Konka
- Ha Kopialla
- Ha Lechesa
- Ha Lepotisa
- Ha Lethata
- Ha Maama
- Ha Majara
- Ha Makhethe
- Ha Maraisane
- Ha Mohapinyane
- Ha Moroko
- Ha Motšoane
- Ha Nkoe (Thoteng)
- Ha Nonyana
- Ha Ntsane
- Ha Phasekalise (Bongalla)
- Ha Puso
- Ha Ratšele
- Ha Sera
- Ha Tlhoeli
- Mafikeng
- Mahaneng
- Malehlakana
- Mangoaboleng
- Masaleng
- Mashaeng
- Mashaleng
- Matebeleng
- Matsekoane
- Matsela
- Phahameng
- Phallang
- Sekhutlong
- Taung
- Thibella
- White City
