= Liqhobong =

- Community Council
- Geographic Center of Community
- Coordinates: 28°37′06″S 28°37′04″E
- Country: Lesotho
- District: Butha-Buthe District
- Elevation: 7,674 ft (2,339 m)

Population (2006)
  - Total: 5,524
- Time zone: UTC+2 (CAT)
- Coordinates computed from Lesotho Villages file.

Liqhobong is a community council located in the Butha-Buthe District of Lesotho. Its population in 2006 was 5,524.

== Villages ==
The community of Liqhobong includes the villages of Boiketsiso, Ha 'Makhoshane, Ha Jesi, Ha Keletso (Mafika-Lisiu), Ha Khaketla (Seqhobong), Ha Mabitle, Ha Makai, Ha Mohau, Ha Mok'hobo, Ha Molisana, Ha Mothae, Ha Motheane, Ha Motšoene, Ha Nchoatla, Ha Ntoro, Ha Ntsoebe, Ha Sefako, Ha Sekoati (Phahleng), Ha Tšoeunyana, Kholokoe, Libono, Liqobong, Makanyaneng, Manoeleng, Mantšonyana, Maqokoeng, Masetleng, Phamong, Pitsaneng, Pitseng and Saballa.
