= Robin Hanbury-Tenison =

English explorer (born 1936)

Robin Hanbury-Tenison OBE DL FRGS FLS
- Born: Airling Robin Hanbury-Tenison; 7 May 1936 (age 90)
- Education: Eton College
- Alma mater: Magdalen College, Oxford
- Organization: Survival International (President)
- Spouses: Marika Hanbury-Tenison (m. 1959; died 1982): Louella Williams
- Children: 3
- Website: www.robinsbooks.co.uk

Airling Robin Hanbury-Tenison OBE DL FLS FRGS (born 7 May 1936) is an explorer based in Cornwall. He is Founder of the charity Survival International and was previously Chief Executive of The Countryside Alliance.

== Early life and education ==
The youngest of five children born to Gerald Evan Farquhar Tenison, a Major in the 3rd Dragoon Guards, and his wife Ruth Julia Margarette Hanbury of the Pontypool Park Estate, Robin grew up on the Tenison family's historic Anglo-Irish estate Lough Bawn in Castleblayney, County Monaghan, Ireland.

He was educated at Eton College and Magdalen College, Oxford.

== Personal life ==
In 1959, he married Marika Hopkinson. She became well known for her cookery books. They had two children, Lucy (b. 1960) and Rupert (b. 1970). Marika died in 1982.

Hanbury-Tenison later married Louella (née Williams), with whom he had another son, Merlin.

== Career ==
In 1957 Hanbury-Tenison was the first person to travel overland by jeep from London to Sri Lanka (then known as Ceylon). In 1958 he and Richard Mason became the first to cross South America overland at its widest point. In 1964–65 he made the first river crossing of South America from north to south from the Orinoco to Buenos Aires (at first with Sebastian Snow). In 1968 he took part in the Geographical magazine's Amazonas Expedition by hovercraft from Manaus in Brazil to the Republic of Trinidad.

=== Survival International ===
Discussions with the ethnobotanist Conrad Gorinsky led to the foundation of the charity Survival International. In 1971, as Chairman of Survival (and with Marika), he visited 33 Indian tribes in Brazil at the invitation of the Brazilian government and reported on their condition. In 1977–78 he led the Royal Geographical Society's Gunung Mulu expedition to Sarawak, the Society's largest expedition at that time, taking 115 scientists into the rainforest for 15 months.

=== Farming ===
From 1960 to 2018 Hanbury-Tenison farmed over 2,000 acres of hill farm on Bodmin Moor in Cornwall with sheep and cattle, diversified with Angora goats, red deer and wild boar from Russia, and later farming energy from wind, solar, water and biomass. The farm has been farmed by Merlin Hanbury-Tenison since 2018 who aims for greater sustainability.

== Later career ==
In 1982 and 1983 he organised Capital Radio's Venture Days in Battersea Park. From 1995 to 1998 he was CEO of the British Field Sports Society, now the Countryside Alliance. He organised the Countryside Rally, which brought 130,000 people to Hyde Park in July 1997, and the Countryside March when 300,000 marched through London in 1998.

In 2015–16 he celebrated his 80th year by undertaking eight challenges, starting with the London Marathon, which raised over £80,000 for Survival International. In 2020 he spent seven weeks in hospital with COVID-19 before returning home to celebrate his 84th birthday.

In 2026, Hanbury-Tenison and his son Merlin pedalled a water-bike along the river Thames from Oxford to Richmond, to raise funding for a research station to study Britain's temperate rainforest.

== Awards and achievements ==
- 1961 RGS Ness Award
- 1965–95 Commissioner of Income Tax
- 1968–82 RGS Council Member, 1982–86 Vice President
- 1969–81 Co-founder and Chairman of Survival International
- 1971 Winston Churchill Memorial Fellow
- 1979 Patron's Medal
- 1980 Winner Krug Award for Excellence
- 1981 President of Survival International
- 1981 Appointed Officer of the Order of the British Empire (OBE)
- 1984–2015 President Camel Valley and Bodmin Moor Protection Society
- 1988–95 President Cornwall Wildlife Trust
- 1998 Farmers Club Cup for outstanding contribution to farming, agriculture and the countryside
- 1999 Chairman Friends of Conservation
- 1999 International Council for Game and Wildlife Conservation Personality of the Year
- 2001 RSGS Mungo Park Medal
- 2000 Pio Manzù Medal (Italy)
- 2000 CLA Contribution to the Countryside Award
- 2001–05 President Rain Forest Club
- 2003 Patron of the Countryside Alliance
- 2003–2011 Deputy Lieutenant for the County of Cornwall
- 2009 President Cornwall Red Squirrel Project
- 2012 Best Large Scale Renewable Energy Scheme in Cornwall Award for Cabilla Manor
- 2013 Exhibition of photographs of tribal people and places, National Theatre
- 2014 Honorary Consul for Kosovo (Cornwall)

== Books ==
- The Rough and the Smooth (1969)
- A Question of Survival for the Indians of Brazil (1973)
- A Pattern of Peoples: A Journey Among the Tribes of Indonesia's Outer Islands (1975)
- Mulu: Rain Forest (1980)
- Aborigines of the Amazon Rain Forest (Peoples of the Wild) (1982)
- Worlds Apart: An Explorer's Life (1984)
- White Horses over France: From the Camargue to Cornwall (1985)
- A Ride Along the Great Wall (1987)
- Fragile Eden: A Ride Through New Zealand (1989)
- Spanish Pilgrimage: A Canter to St. James (1990)
- The Oxford Book of Exploration (1993)
- Mysterious China (1995)
- Chinese Adventure: A Ride Along the Great Wall (2004)
- Worlds Within: Reflections in the Sand (2005)
- The Seventy Great Journeys in History (2006)
- Land of Eagles: Riding Through Europe's Forgotten Country (2009)
- The Great Explorers (2010)
- The Modern Explorers, with Robert Twigger (2013)
- Echoes of a Vanished World: A Traveller's Lifetime in Pictures (2013)
- Beauty Freely Given: A Universal Truth: Artifacts from the Collection of Robin Hanbury-Tenison, with Christopher John Bowden (2013)
- Finding Eden (2017)
- Taming the Four Horsemen (2020)

=== For children ===
- Jake's Escape (1996)
- Jake's Treasure (1997)
- Jake's Safari (1998)

== Films ==
- A Time for Survival. Westward (1972)
- Mysteries of the Green Mountain. BBC (1978)
- Antiques at Home. BBC (1984)
- White Horses over France. BBC/FR3 (1985)
- Great Wall of China (1987)
- Odyssey series, presenter BBC (1988)
- Siberian Tigers (1994)
- Collector's Lot BBC (1998)
- The Lost World of Mulu. C4 (1999)
- Reflections in the Sand. Discovery (2000)
- Testament. Carlton (2000)
- Survival To The Brink and Back. BBC by Here Now films (2020)
