= Butha-Buthe District =

Coordinates: 28°50′S 28°30′E

Butha-Bothe
- District
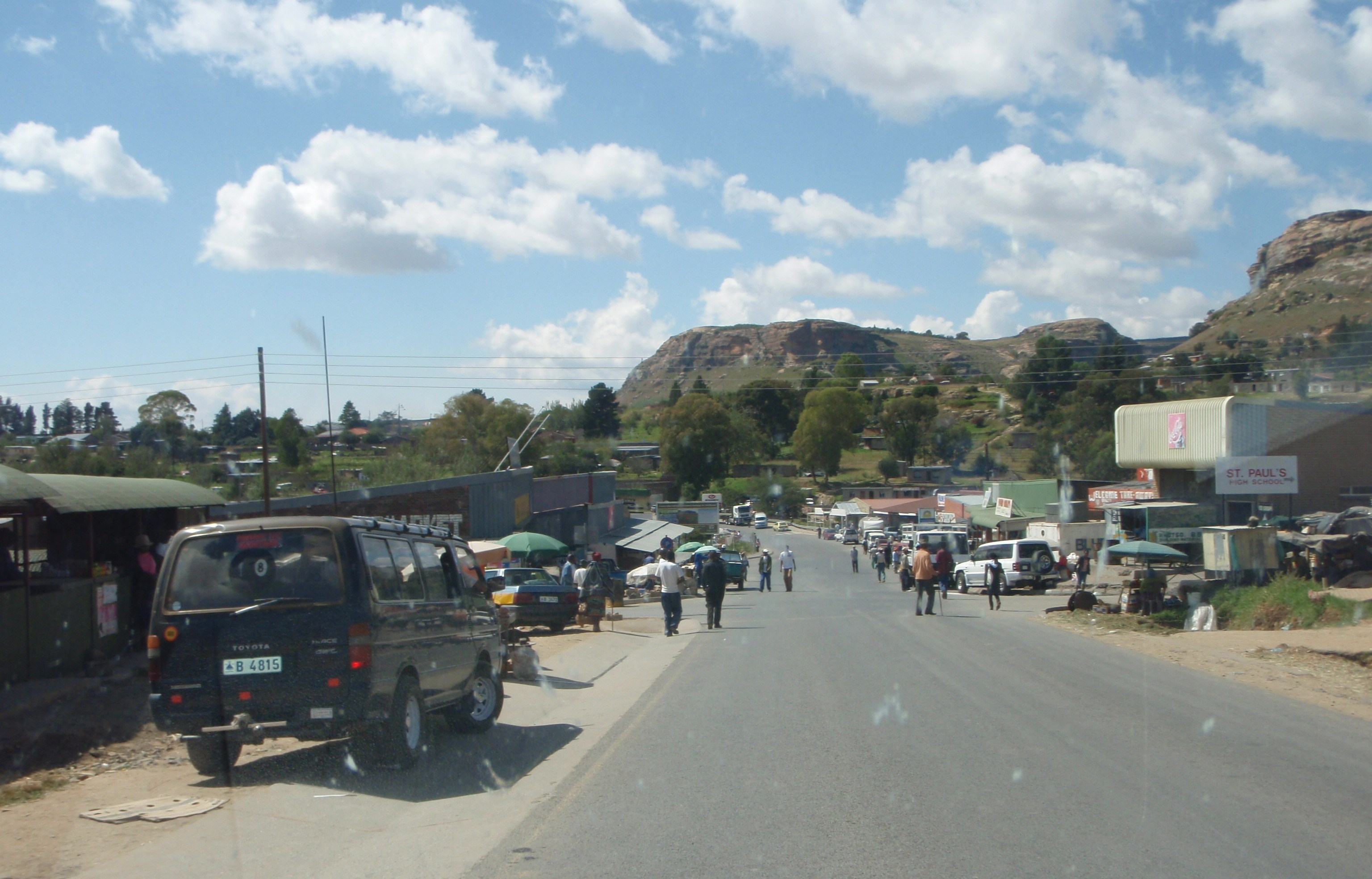
- Image of Butha Buthe

- Map of Lesotho with the district highlighted
- Country: Lesotho
- Capital: Butha-Buthe

Area
  - Total: 1,767 km^{2} (682 sq mi)

Population (2014)
  - Total: 118,242
  - Density: 66.92/km^{2} (173.3/sq mi)
- Time zone: UTC+2 (CAT)
- Area code: +266
- HDI (2019): 0.536 low · 3rd

Butha-Buthe is a district of Lesotho. Butha-Buthe is the capital or camptown, and only town in the district. In the north, Butha-Buthe borders on the Free State Province of South Africa. Domestically, it borders on Mokhotlong District in southeast and Leribe District on the south.

As of 2014, the district had a population of 118,242 which was 5.88 per cent of the total population of the country. The total area of the district was 1,767 which was 5.82 per cent of the total area of the country. As of 2008, there were 49 per cent economically active people in the district. There were totally 71,012 employed people out of a total of 154,384 people in the district above 15 years of age. The total area planted in 2009 was 7,164 which formed 1.77 per cent of the total area planted in the country.

== Demographics ==
As of 2014, the district had a population of 118,242, 5.88 per cent of the population of the country. The area of the district was 1,767, 5.82 per cent of the country. The population density was 62 persons per square kilometre, same as the country as a whole. There were five constituencies and ten community councils in the district. As of 2006, 323 persons tested HIV positive, 20.20 per cent of the country's HIV positive population. 128 of these were men (12.40 per cent); 195 were women (25.30 per cent).

== Geography ==
In the north, Butha-Buthe borders on the Free State Province of South Africa. Domestically, it borders on Mokhotlong District in southeast and Leribe District on the south. It is traversed by the northwesterly line of equal latitude and longitude. The Western districts of Lesotho has predominantly low land zone with an elevation of 1,500 m (4,900 ft) 1,800 m (5,900 ft) above the sea level. These lands are the major agricultural zones in the country. The average annual rainfall in the country is 100 cm (39 in), most of which is received during the rainy season of October to April. Though it rains during all the months of the year, groundwater is limited on account of run-offs. The region has a temperate climate on account of the elevation and is humid during most parts of the year. The temperature in low lands vary from 32 °C (90 °F) to −7 °C (19 °F) in the winter.

Climate data for Butha-Buthe District
Month	Jan	Feb	Mar	Apr	May	Jun	Jul	Aug	Sep	Oct	Nov	Dec	Year
Mean daily maximum °C (°F)	26 (79)	26 (79)	24 (75)	21 (70)	19 (66)	16 (61)	15 (59)	20 (68)	22 (72)	26 (79)	26 (79)	27 (81)	22 (72)
Mean daily minimum °C (°F)	14 (57)	14 (57)	11 (52)	5 (41)	5 (41)	1 (34)	1 (34)	6 (43)	5 (41)	11 (52)	13 (55)	14 (57)	8 (47)
Average rainfall mm (inches)	186 (7.3)	59 (2.3)	79 (3.1)	7 (0.3)	60 (2.4)	38 (1.5)	0 (0)	6 (0.2)	0 (0)	30 (1.2)	181 (7.1)	145 (5.7)	792 (31.2)
Source 1:
Source 2:

== Economy ==
As of 2008, there were 49 per cent economically active people in the district. There were totally 71,012 employed people out of a total of 154,384 people in the district above 15 years of age. The employed population in the age group of 6–14 years was 1,232 out of a total of 43,674 people in the district in the age group. The labour force participation stood at 180.50. The number of people involved in subsistence agriculture is 836 and the number of people in other sectors was 396. The number of unemployed people in the district was 21,800 and the unemployment rate was 071. The total area planted in 2009 was 7,164 which formed 1.77 per cent of the total area planted in the country. The total production was 3,108 tonnes, which was 2.06 per cent of the totals in the country. The major crop was maize, while wheat, sorghum, beans and peas were the other crops planted. The total production of maize was 2,023 tonnes, beans was 088 tonnes, sorghum was 64 tonnes, peas was 453 tonnes and wheat was 480 tonnes as of 2008. As of 2007, there were a total of 293 km (182 mi) of paved roads in the district, with 105 km (65 mi) paved roads and 188 km (117 mi) of unpaved roads.

== Constituencies ==
Constituencies of Butha-Buthe District are Butha-Bothe, Hololo, Mechachane, Motete and Qalo. The Community councils of Butha-Buthe District are Kao, Likila, Linakeng, Lipelaneng, Liqhobong, Makhunoane, 'Moteng, Ntelle, Sekhobe and Tša-Le-Moleka. As per the 1968 Local Government Repeal Act - Development Committees Order No.9 of 1986, a District Development Committee (DDC) should have a set of Ward Development Committees (WDC) for each ward and Village Development Committees (VDC) under it. Each VDC has a set of seven elected members and the head would be an ex-officio member and chairman of the committee. The WDC is composed of twelve members elected from about VDCs, whose chairman would be and ex-officio member. The fifteen-membered DDC is elected by the members of WDC. When there are cases of more than one DDC, the chiefs would alternate in meetings. The district secretary co-ordinates the activities of the various committees. As per the Local Government Amendment Act 2004, the District Development Coordination Committee was established as the supreme body of district administration, under which all the district councils were branched. The urban and municipal councils were under each district council, which in turn had community councils under it. The Independent Electoral Commission (IEC) is responsible for the administration of the Local Government Elections. The nation's first local government elections were conducted in April 2005, while the most recent elections were held in October 2011. During these elections, 64 community councils, 11 urban councils and one municipal council were elected.
