= Rockwell Diamonds =

Rockwell Diamonds, Inc.
- Type: Public company
- Industry: Mining
- Headquarters: Vancouver, Canada
- Key people: Willem Jacobs CEO, Mark Bristow, Chairman
- Products: Rough high value diamonds
- Website: RockwellDiamonds.com

Rockwell Diamonds was a mid-tier diamond mining and development company. The company had an interest in producing and exploration alluvial diamond properties in southern Africa. The stock of the company once traded on the South African, Canadian, and American exchanges, but is now in the process of liquidation.

== History ==
Rockwell Diamonds Inc was in news in 2009 when Switzerland based Pala Investments Holdings Limited made a takeover bid for the company which was resisted by the minority directors of the company. The bid did not succeed.

In May 2010 the Financial Times reported that Rockwell Diamonds was again a takeover target.

In April 2013, the firm sold its Klipdam mine in South Africa to a private diamond miner for R23 million. Rockwell announced it would reinvest the money in the Niewejaarskraal mine and into the growth of the company's footprint in the Middle Orange River region.

In 2016, Rockwell sold its non-core assets to Nelesco Group, a South African private mining company, as part of the restructuring of the company after the resignation of its CEO. In 2017, liquidators were appointed for Rockwell's South African mines, and trading of its stock was halted. In September 2017, Rockwell was reported to be seeking buyers for its mines.

== Properties and projects ==
The company's mines are:

- Wouterspan Property
- Saxendrift & South Bank Middle Orange River Operations
- Niewejaarskraal & South Bank Middle Orange River Operations

All were producing mines, with no exploration risk or costs attached to them. Rockwell operates the Holpan mine north of Kimberley, and the Saxendift mine on the Middle Orange River ("MOR") southwest of Kimberley. The Wouterspan mine, also located on the MOR, is on care and maintenance. All of these operations are located in the Northern Cape Province of South Africa.
