= Kao, Lesotho =

Kao
- Community Council
- Geographic Center of Community
- Coordinates: 29°01′30″S 28°34′04″E
- Country: Lesotho
- District: Butha-Buthe District
- Elevation: 8,471 ft (2,582 m)

Population (2006)
  - Total: 5,304
- Time zone: UTC+2 (CAT)
- Coordinates computed from Lesotho Villages file.

Kao, Lesotho is a community council located in the Butha-Buthe District of Lesotho. Its population in 2006 was 5,304.

== Villages ==
The community of Kao includes the villages of

Ha Khokong
Ha Leketlane
Ha Lephatsoana
Ha Lesaoana
Ha Mahlekefane
Ha Maphale
Ha Matsoete (Boritsa)
Ha Rakotoane
Ha Ralinko

Ha Sello
Ha Sepetla (Boritsa)
Ha Tlholo
Ha Tomo
Kao
Khatleng
Khohlong (Boritsa)
Khohlong (Ha Rampai)
Khutlo-Seaja (Ha Molema)

Lehlakaneng
Lihloahloeng (Kao)
Mafiseng (Ha Rampai)
Masuoaneng
Matebeleng (Khokong)
Perekising (Boritsa)
Pimville (Boritsa)
Tiping
