= Roy Sesana =

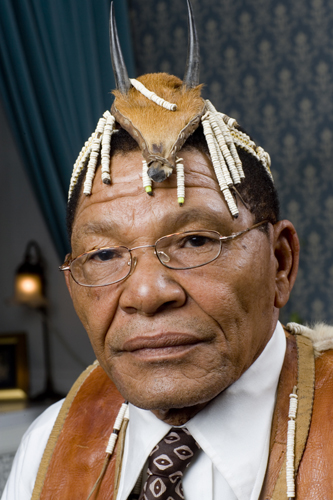
- Born: c. 1950; Molapo, Bechuanaland Protectorate (now Botswana)
- Known for: Human rights defender
- Awards: Right Livelihood Award
- Scientific career
- Fields: Traditional medicine man Human rights
- Workplaces: First People of the Kalahari

"UB Honors Dr Roy Sesana". Press Reader. The Voice Newspaper Botswana. 30 October 2026.

Dr Roy Sesana (born c. 1950) is a San activist who worked together with the First People of the Kalahari for the rights of his people.

== Biography ==
Sesana lives in New Xade in the central Kalahari and works as a traditional medicine man. He moved to South Africa for a couple of years, but returned to his people in 1971 in order to live together with them in the desert. He is a leader of the people of the Gǁana, Gǀwi and Kalahari Bushmen. In 1991, he joined the First People of Kalahari (FPK) with John Hardbattle, which intensively promotes the traditional way of life, protecting the nature. In 1997, a small group of Bushmen still living in the Central Kalahari Game Reserve were resettled to the new built town of New Xade. The government claimed that this was a result of a mutual understanding that the continued presence of the group within the reserve was in conflict with the preservation of the game reserve. The government also claimed that it could not provide the group with basic infrastructure and services while they were within the reserve for the same reasons. A group of Bushmen represented by First People of the Kalahari refused to move, citing difficult conditions in the new settlement, the unfamiliar way of life they had to adjust to and many new social ills such as unemployment, alcoholism and diseases, especially HIV-AIDS.In 1995 Roy became chairman of FPK. He has traveled to Europe and the United States a few times to stop Botswana government from forcing his people to evict their land.

In 2002, the First People of the Kalahari took the Government of Botswana to court to seek the right for the relocated people to return to the reserve. The protracted court case attracted substantial international attention. On December 13, 2006, Botswana's High Court ruled in the Bushmen's favour, stating that the evictions were unlawful and unconstitutional.

In September 2005, Sesana was arrested for "rioting" and attempting to "forcibly enter the Central Kalahari Game Reserve", but was released a couple of days later. In December 2005, he received the Right Livelihood Award for "resolute resistance against eviction from their ancestral lands, and for upholding the right to their traditional way of life."

== Honours and Recognition ==
On 23 October 2026, Roy Sesana was conferred an Honorary Doctor of Letters (DLitt honoris causa) by the University of Botswana in recognition of his lifelong commitment to defending indigenous rights, cultural identity and the dignity of marginalised communities.

== See also ==
- Davi Kopenawa Yanomami
- Stephen Corry
