= Donald K. Anton =

American academic

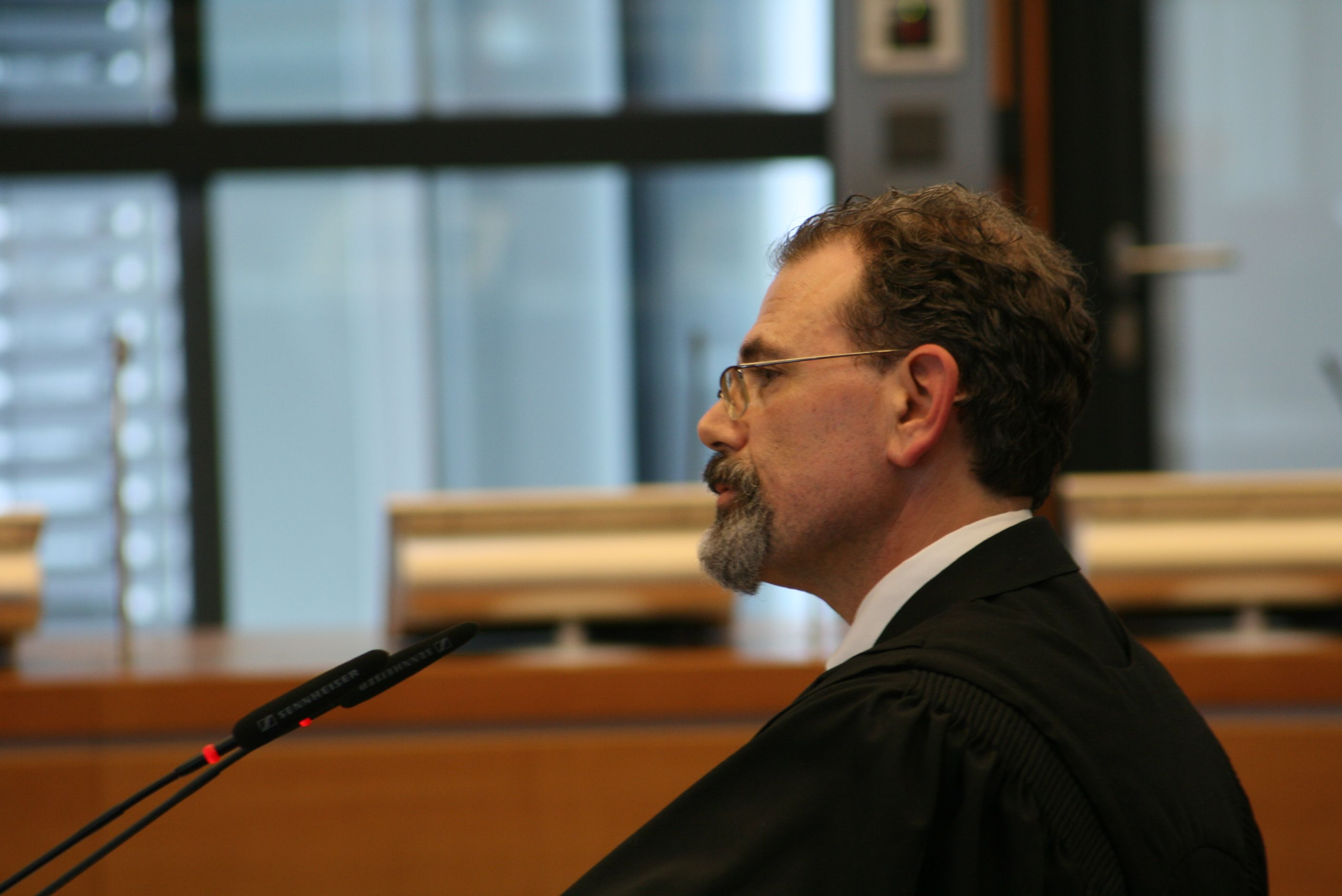
Anton making oral submissions before the International Tribunal for the Law of the Sea in 2010

Donald Kris Anton (Don Anton) has been a Professor of International Law since 1994. He took up the inaugural Chair of International Law at Griffith University in 2015. From 2016-2020, Anton was the Director of the Griffith University Law Futures Centre. Prior to coming to Griffith University, Anton was a Professor of Law at The Australian National University, where he taught from 2000-2015. He resigned his posts at Griffith on turning 60 years of age and has been an Honorary Professor of Law at the Australian National University since 2019.

In 2025, he came out of retirement to take up a non-onging position as a Senior Legal Officer in the Australian Attorney-General's Office of International Law in order to do his bit to contribute to Australia's leadership in championing and defending the international rules based order. He again retired in 2026.

== Early life ==
Anton was born at St. Mary's Hospital in Saint Louis, Missouri, U.S.A. on March 20, 1960. He graduated from Saint John Vianney High School in Kirkwood, Missouri in 1978. Following High School, Anton worked as a fire fighter with the Pattonville Fire Protection District in North St. Louis County and was a member of International Association of Fire Fighters (IAFF) Local Union 2665.

== Education and work ==
Don received a Bachelor of Science degree from the University of Central Missouri in 1983 and a Juris Doctor degree from St. Louis University School of Law in 1986. He clerked for two years with Judge Paul J. Simon of the Missouri Court of Appeals (Eastern District) from 1986-1988 and practiced law in Boise, Idaho with the law firm Elam, Burke & Boyd, as it then was called, from 1988-1991.

Anton began his academic career in 1992, taking up a position as a Research Associate in International Law at Columbia Law School with Professor Louis Henkin. In 2004, Anton moved to Australia to take up a position as a lecturer in Law at the University of Melbourne Law School, where he taught until 1997. In 1997, Anton returned to the practice of law, where he served as the first Director of Policy and as a Senior Solicitor with the Environmental Defender's Office in Sydney and Melbourne, Australia. Anton returned to the academe in 2000 as a lecturer at The Australian National University College of Law.

Anton has been a visiting professor at a number of law schools around the world. In 2003 and again from 2008-2010 he was a visiting professor at the University of Michigan Law School. In 2007 he was a visiting professor at the University of Alabama School of Law. In 2013, he was one of the first Visiting Professors at the University of Yangon's Department of Law following greater openness by the Myanmar government in 2012.

In addition to publishing numerous books and articles, Anton maintains an active international pro bono law practice and has appeared as Counsel in the International Tribunal for the Law of the Sea, the Inter-American Court of Human Rights, and the Supreme Court of the United States of America. He is an Ehliu Root Patron of the American Society of International Law.

== Nationality ==
Anton was born as a citizen of the United States of America and is still a national of the U.S.A. In 1997, he was naturalized as a citizen of Australia. In 2024, Anton had his Italian citizenship by vitrue of jus sanguines through his Italian born mother confirmed. He is now a tri-national.
