= Gem Diamonds =

Gem Diamonds Ltd.
- Type: Public (LSE: GEMD)
- Industry: Diamond Mining
- Founded: 2005
- Headquarters: London, England, UK
- Key people: Mike Brown, Chairman; Clifford Elphick, CEO
- Revenue: $98.4 million (2025)
- Website: www.gemdiamonds.com

Gem Diamonds is a British-based global diamond mining business. It is headquartered in London and is listed on the London Stock Exchange. In 2017, the company generated a profit of $20.8 million.

== History ==
The business was founded by Clifford Elphick in July 2005.

The company acquired Letšeng diamond mine in 2006, and has since found five of the 20 largest known white gem quality diamonds, elevating the mine to the highest dollar-per-carat kimberlite diamond operation in the world.

The company was first listed on the London Stock Exchange in 2007.

In 2007, the company began diamond prospecting on traditional Bushmen lands in Botswana. Survival International alleged that the company had not carried out sufficient consultation with the Bushmen, many of whom have been forced from their homes.

Construction of the first phase of a mine, Ghaghoo, located 45 km within the Eastern border of the Central Kalahari Game Reserve began in 2011. It is a controversial matter as the government of Botswana has allowed for mining exploration and construction within a game reserve originally intended for the Bushmen and the wildlife they subsist on. While one cannot directly prove the government's intentions, a year before this exploration began the government started the forced removal of the Bushmen from their lands.

== Significant gem discoveries ==
In 2006, the company announced that it had found a diamond of 603 carats (120.6 g) at the Letseng diamond mine in Lesotho, which became known as the Lesotho Promise.

In January 2018, a larger stone was discovered at Letseng, measuring 910 carats (182 g) — the fifth-largest gem-quality diamond ever found. Named the Lesotho Legend, the gem sold in Antwerp, Belgium on 12 March 2018 for $40 million.

In March 2018, the company announced recovery of its seventh diamond over 100 carats at Letseng during the first quarter of 2018, a "top white colour Type IIa diamond," measured at 169 carats (33.8 g).

Several of Gem Diamond's significant finds in Lesotho have been purchased by Graff Diamonds.

In 2026, Gem Diamonds recovered a 104.73-carat Type IIa white diamond, a 151.52-carat yellow diamond and a 346.99 carat white diamond from its Letšeng mine in Lesotho. The 346.99 carat diamond was named the Lesotho Jubilee to commemorate the 60th anniversary of Lesotho's independence that will be celebrated on 4 October 2026.

== Operations ==
The Company has mines in the following locations:

- Lesotho

== See also ==
- Rockwell Diamonds
- List of companies based in London
