= First People of the Kalahari =

Botswana organization for rights of the San people

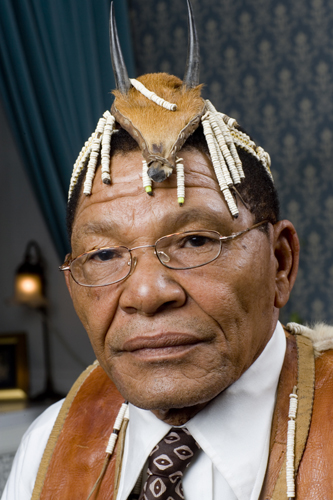
Roy Sesana

First People of the Kalahari (FPK) was a local advocacy organisation in Botswana that worked for the rights of the indigenous San who had been forced by the Government of Botswana to resettle to the new built town of New Xade. The organization was founded in 1991, registered in 1992 and officially recognised in 1993. Roy Sesana became chairman in 1995 and had a leading role in the organisation. Sesana and FPK were awarded the Right Livelihood Award in 2005. FPK had dissolved as an organisation by 2013.

Roy Sesana is also known as Tobee Tcori – his Bushman name. He is a leader of the Gana, Gwi and Bakgalagadi ‘Bushmen’. As such, he is one of their most eloquent spokespeople. He was born in a Bushman community, Molapo, in Botswana, at least 50 years ago – he doesn't know his precise age. He spent a few years as a labourer in South Africa before returning to the central Kalahari in 1971, to train as a traditional healer.
