= Central Kalahari Game Reserve =

National park in Botswana

- Botswana's Central Kalahari Game Reserve
- Coordinates: 21°53′22″S 23°45′23″E

Central Kalahari Game Reserve is an extensive national park in the Kalahari Desert of Botswana. Established in 1961 it covers an area of 52,800 square kilometres (20,400 mi^{2}) (larger than the Netherlands, and almost 10% of Botswana's total land area), making it the second largest game reserve in the world. The reserve is located entirely within Botswana's Ghanzi District, making up over 40% of the district's territory.

== History ==
The Bushmen, or San, have inhabited the lands for thousands of years since they roamed the area as nomadic hunters. However, since the mid-1990s the Botswana government has tried to relocate the Bushmen from the reserve, claiming they were a drain on financial resources despite revenues from tourism. In 1997, three quarters of the entire San population were relocated from the reserve, and in October 2005 the government had resumed the forced relocation into resettlement camps outside of the park leaving only about 250 permanent occupiers. In 2006 a Botswana court proclaimed the eviction illegal and affirmed the Bushmen's right to return to living in the reserve. However, as of 2015 most Bushmen are blocked from access to their traditional lands in the reserve. A nationwide ban on hunting made it illegal for the Bushmen to practice their traditional hunter-gatherer lifestyle, despite allowing private game ranches to provide hunting opportunities for tourists.

In 2014 a diamond mine called Ghaghoo operated by Gem Diamonds opened in the southeast portion of the reserve. The company estimated that the mine could yield $4.9 billion worth of diamonds. The Rapaport Diamond Report, a diamond-industry pricing guide, stated, "Ghaghoo's launch was not without controversy [...] given its location on the ancestral land of the Bushmen".

A huge bush fire in and around the park in the middle of September 2008 burnt around 80 percent of the reserve. The origin of the fire remains unknown.

== Geography ==
The land is mostly flat, and gently undulating covered with bush and grasses covering the sand dunes, and areas of larger trees. Many of the river valleys are fossilized with salt pans. Four fossilized rivers meander through the reserve including Deception Valley which began to form around 16,000 years ago.

== Wildlife ==
The Central Kalahari Game Reserve hosts South African giraffe, African bush elephant, spotted hyena, brown hyena, honey badger, meerkat, yellow mongoose, common warthog, South African cheetah, caracal, African wild dog, black-backed jackal, bat-eared fox, cape fox, African leopard, lion, blue wildebeest, plains zebra, common eland, sable antelope, gemsbok, springbok, steenbok, impala, greater kudu, aardvark, cape ground squirrel, cape hare, cape porcupine, red hartebeest and ostrich.

The most common trees are species of acacia and terminalia.
