= Survival International =

UK-based non-governmental organisation

- Founded: 1969; 57 years ago
- Type: International non-governmental organisation
- Location(s): London, EC1; United Kingdom
- Region served: Worldwide
- Services: Indigenous rights
- Method: Media attention, education, mass letter-writing, research, lobbying
- Key people: Professor James Wood (Chairman); Robin Hanbury-Tenison (President); Caroline Pearce (Director)
- Revenue: £1.18 million (2022)
- Expenses: £1.41 million (2022)
- Award: Right Livelihood Award
- Website: www.survivalinternational.org

Survival International is a human rights organisation formed in 1969 that describes itself as a global movement for the collective rights of Indigenous, tribal and uncontacted peoples. Survival works in partnership with Indigenous and tribal peoples, and offers a platform that helps ensure that the world can hear their voices.

The organisation's campaigns generally focus on tribal peoples' desires to keep their ancestral lands, which they rely on for food, housing, medicines, clothing and a sense of identity and belonging. Survival International calls these peoples "extraordinarily resilient". The organisation aims to eradicate what it calls 'colonial land grabs' used to justify violations of human rights. It also aims to publicise harm caused to tribes by corporations and governments. Survival International states that it aims to help foster tribal people's self-determination.

Survival International is in association with the United Nations Department of Global Communications and in consultative status with the UN Economic and Social Council. To ensure freedom of action, Survival accepts no corporate or government funding. It is a founding member and a signatory organisation of the Accountability Charter (INGO Accountability Charter). Survival's international headquarters are in London and it has offices in Amsterdam, Berlin, Madrid, Milan, Paris, and San Francisco.

== History ==
Survival International was founded in 1969 (as the "Primitive Peoples Fund") after an article by Norman Lewis in The Sunday Times Magazine highlighted the massacres, land thefts and genocide taking place in Brazilian Amazonia. In 1971, the fledgling organisation visited Brazil to observe the Fundação Nacional do Índio (FUNAI) government agency responsible for tribal peoples there. After a name change, Survival International incorporated as an English company in 1972 and registered as a charity in 1974. According to the autobiography of its first chairman, the explorer Robin Hanbury-Tenison, while travelling with the ethnobotanist Conrad Gorinsky in the Amazon in 1968,

"We decided that an organisation should be created to oppose these short-sighted policies; that it should be based upon principles which take into account the Indians' own desires and needs rather than our society's prejudices; that it should strive to protect the rights of Indians to their lands, their cultures and their identity; that it should foster respect for and research into their knowledge and experience so that through being recognised as experts they should be allowed to survive and we should learn from them and so contribute to our own survival. Thus the concept of Survival International was born. When, a few months later, exposure in the European press of the atrocities perpetrated in Brazil against the Brazilian Indians by the very agency created to protect them, roused public opinion, we were ready to join in the slow process of raising money and building an organisation."

— Robin Hanbury-Tenison - President and co-founder of Survival International

It was the first in this field to use mass letter-writing, having orchestrated several campaigns in many different places throughout the world, such as Siberia, Canada, and Kenya. Several campaigns were able to bring change to government policies regarding the rights of local Indigenous people. In 2000, this form of struggle was successful in driving the Indian government to abandon their plan to relocate the isolated Jarawa tribe, after receiving 150-200 letters a day from Survival supporters around the world. Shortly before that, the governor of western Siberia imposed a five-year ban on all oil licences in the territory of the Yugan Khanty within weeks of Survival issuing a bulletin. Survival was also the first organisation to draw attention to the destructive effects of World Bank projects – now recognised as a major cause of suffering in many poor countries.

Survival is the only international pro-tribal peoples organisation to have received the Right Livelihood Award, as well as the Spanish "Premio Léon Felipe" and the Italian "Medaglia della Presidenza della Camera dei Deputati".

== Structure and aims ==
Survival International works for Indigenous peoples' rights on three complementary levels: education, advocacy and campaigns. It also offers tribal people a platform to address the world, while connecting with local Indigenous organisations, with a focus on tribal peoples under more urgent threat from contact with the outside world. The educational programs are aimed at people in the Western world, aiming at "demolishing the myth that tribal people are relics, destined to perish through 'progress'". Survival seeks to promote respect for their cultures and explain their relevance today in preserving their way of life.

"If we want to help societies our first job is to listen, rather than to dictate what we think they need, and we must be prepared to be surprised. This is not just to do with remote tribal peoples: it's of vital relevance to all in a world where ideas of multiculturalism are misunderstood and under attack and where some increasingly want to force their views on others."

— Stephen Corry, former Director of Survival International, April 2007

Survival has supporters in 100 countries. Its materials are published in many languages throughout the world. It is a registered charity in the United Kingdom and the equivalent in Germany, France, Italy, Spain, and the United States, and can receive tax-free donations in the Netherlands.

Survival refuses government funding, depending exclusively on public support, in order to ensure freedom of action. All the people sent into the field belong to Survival International staff, none are sponsored volunteers or visitors of any kind. Overseas projects are carried and managed by tribes themselves.

== Tribes ==
There are more than 476 million tribal people worldwide, living in more than 90 countries around the world. These include at least 196 uncontacted peoples in 10 countries. Survival International supports these endangered tribes on a global level, with campaigns established in the Americas, Africa, the Pacific and Asia. Most of them have been persecuted and face genocide by diseases, relocation from their homes by logging and mining, and eviction by settlers.

"Uncontacted peoples are not passive or ignorant. They know about outsiders, they are making a choice to reject and resist contact, and they are powerfully supported by Indigenous neighbors."

— Caroline Pearce, Executive Director, Survival International

Survival believes that Indigenous rights to land ownership, although recognised by international law, are not effectively respected, with tribes being invaded by activities such as oil and mineral mining, logging, cattle ranching, private or government "development" schemes such as building of roads and dams, or for nature reserves and game parks. Beyond these economic causes for exploitive invasions, Survival highlights ignorance and racism that sees tribal peoples as backward and primitive. Survival believes that in the long-term, public opinion is the most effective force for change.

The impact of the outside world on the existence of Indigenous peoples and their cultures is described as being very dramatic. In Siberia, only 10% of the tribal peoples live a nomadic or semi-nomadic life, compared to 70% 30 years ago. In 2025, Survival published the first comprehensive report on uncontacted peoples worldwide. It found that almost half of the world's uncontacted peoples could be wiped out within ten years if governments and companies did not take action.

In Brazil – where Survival has found evidence of 124 uncontacted peoples – there are about 400 speakers for 110 languages. For authors such as Daniel Everett, this phenomenon represents a fundamental assault on the existence of peoples, as language expresses the way a group of people experience reality in a unique way, and it is a part of our common heritage. Ranka Bjeljac-Babic, lecturer and specialist in the psychology of language, describes an intrinsic and causal link between the threat of biological diversity and cultural diversity. The assault on Indigenous customs and traditions is described as part of a larger assault on life, with its historical roots in colonization. Survival's report Progress can Kill highlights that the invasion of the Americas and Australia by Europeans eliminated 90% of the Indigenous population on these continents. The threat of genocide continues.

Most fundamentally, Survival believes that it is the respect for the right to keep their land that may allow them to survive. The issues of human rights and freedom depend on the land on which they can subsist and develop according to their own culture. Interference with this basic need endangers their capacity to live sustainably.

In January 2019, the newly elected president of Brazil Jair Bolsonaro stripped the Indigenous affairs agency FUNAI of the responsibility to identify and demarcate Indigenous lands. He argued that those territories have very tiny isolated populations and proposed to integrate them into the larger Brazilian society. According to the Survival International, "Taking responsibility for Indigenous land demarcation away from FUNAI, the Indian affairs department, and giving it to the Agriculture Ministry is virtually a declaration of open warfare against Brazil's tribal peoples."

== Campaigns ==
Survival International campaigns alongside Indigenous people around the world. Its current campaigns are in the Americas, Africa and Asia and the Pacific. They select their cases based on a criterion the organisation has established, which depends on a wide range of factors, such as the reliability and continuity of the information, the gravity of the situation the tribe in question is facing, the degree to which they believe their work can make a real difference, the degree to which improvements in this area would have a knock on effect for others, whether any other organisation is already working on the case, and whether they are sure of what the people themselves want.

A common threat to the tribes for which Survival campaigns is the invasion of their lands for exploration of resources. This invariably leads to forced relocation, loss of sustainability and forced changes in their way of living. Usually, this is accompanied by diseases from the contact with the outsiders for which they have an unprepared immune system – this threat alone can wipe out entire tribes. Logging and/or cattle ranchers have affected most of these tribes, from South America, Africa, to Australasia. The Arhuaco, in Colombia, have drug plantations, associated with crossfire from guerilla wars between cartel and government interests. The Ogiek, in Kenya, have tea plantations, and the Amungme in Indonesia, the San in Botswana, the Dongria Kondh in India, and the Palawan in the Philippines have mining fields.

Countries which have Indigenous peoples for whom Survival campaigns. This map represents about 5 million Indigenous people. There are over 300 million Indigenous people in the world, with an estimated over 100 uncontacted tribes.

The Arhuaco, Ayoreo, Aborigines, the Innu, and several tribes in West Papua have all suffered direct attacks on their culture from what, in the perspective of Survival, may constitute good intention, but nevertheless is destructive to their lives.

Besides suffering the genocide brought about through disease and hunger (which is the result of losing their natural environment and having fertile soil stolen from them), Survival says some tribes have suffered campaigns of direct assassination. Most tribes in South America, such as the Awá, Akuntsu, Guaraní, and the Yanomami, have been murdered on sight by multinational workers, ranchers and gunmen for hire, while tribes in Africa and Asia have suffered waves of murder at the hands of the government. Survival International has pointed to the tribe Akuntsu, of which only five members still remain, as an example of what this threat represents: the eventual genocide of a whole people.

Survival International has called attention to the rise in suicide in tribal peoples such as the Innu, Australian Aborigines, and the Guarani, as a consequence of outside interference with the tribes' cultures and direct persecution. Suffering from the trauma of forced relocation, many tribal people find themselves in despair living in an environment they are not used to, where there is nothing useful to do, and where they are treated with racist disdain by their new neighbours. Other social consequences from this displacement have been pointed out to alcoholism and violence, with campaigns reporting the cases of the Innu, Mursi, Bodi, Konso, and Wanniyala-Aetto. Tribal peoples are also more vulnerable to sexual exploitation. Among the tribes with whom Survival International has campaigned, there has been reported rapes of girls and women by workers of invading companies in the Indigenous tribes of Penan, West Papuan tribes, Jummas, and Jarawa.

The government role in these territories varies. Most Brazilian tribes are protected under law, while in reality there has been resistance in policies and strong support for enterprises that carry out these threats on their existence. In Africa, the San tribes and other tribes have been persecuted with beating and torture to force relocation, as well as murder in the Nuba, and in the Bangladesh, Asia, with the Jummas. Sometimes governments offer compensations that are believed by Survival to be unwanted alternatives for the tribes, portrayed as "development".

In April 2012, Survival International launched a worldwide campaign, backed by actor Colin Firth, to protect the Awa-Guajá people of Brazil, which the organisation considers to be the "earth's most threatened tribe".

=== Decolonisation of conservation ===
In late 2015, Survival International started the Stop the Con campaign, which seeks to raise awareness about negative impacts of traditional conservation policies on tribal peoples. This campaign is part of Survival International's larger campaign to decolonise conservation. Survival argues that since the creation of the first National Parks at the end of the 19th century, governments and large conservation organisations have been evicting Indigenous peoples from their lands in the name of conservation. Survival argues that Indigenous peoples are the world's best conservationists and that they and their rights must be at the centre of the fight against environmental destruction and climate change.

=== Botswana ===
Survival International has campaigned for land rights for the San/Bushmen of the Central Kalahari Game Reserve since the 1980s. It supported them in their successful high court case against the Botswana government which had evicted them from the reserve in 2002. It was the longest court case in Botswana's legal history and lasted over four years. In a landmark judgment delivered in December 2006 the judges ruled that the government had acted illegally and unconstitutionally when it evicted the San and banned them from hunting. Since the ruling many San/Bushmen returned to their ancestral territories in the Central Kalahari Game Reserve despite the fact the government made life as difficult as possible for them by refusing to provide basic services such as access to water and a mobile health clinic and forcing them to apply for permits to return to their ancestral land.

Survival supported a group of San to take the government to court in 2010 over its refusal to allow them to access a water borehole in their community in the Central Kalahari Game Reserve. They lost the case and successfully appealed to the high court which ruled in 2011 that the San "being the lawful occupiers, do not require a water right for the use of the Mothomelo borehole, or indeed any other current or future borehole on land in the CKGR, for domestic purposes".

The current President of Botswana, Duma Boko, who was part of the Bushmen's legal team in the 2006 court case, stated that his government is "committed to placing human rights at the core of its policies". In March 2025 the Minister of Justice announced the appointment of an Inter-Ministerial Committee to examine the situation of San/Bushmen, including those who live in the Central Kalahari Game Reserve. He told Parliament that it "will work to find sustainable solutions to longstanding human rights concerns of Basarwa [San/Bushmen] while promoting national unity in diversity".

=== Electric vehicles ===
In 2024, Survival published a report on how the demand for electric cars is destroying uncontacted Indigenous people's lives and lands in Indonesia. They are calling for electric vehicle companies to pledge that none of the minerals they buy ever comes from the lands of uncontacted Indigenous people in Halmahera.

=== Uncontacted peoples ===
In 2025, Survival published the first comprehensive report on uncontacted peoples worldwide. It found robust evidence of 196 uncontacted peoples living in ten countries across South America, Asia and the Pacific. However, it also found that almost half of those peoples could be wiped out within ten years if governments and companies do not take action. Survival's campaign called for industry associations, asking them to keep resources from uncontacted peoples' land out of their members' supply chains.

== Media attention ==
Survival International has received attention in the media over the years with the campaigns and work of volunteer supporters. Celebrity endorsements include Richard Gere, who has spoken up for the Jumma of Bangladesh, Julie Christie, who gave a Radio 4 appeal on behalf of the Khanty of Siberia, Judi Dench, who warned of the events surrounding the Arhuaco of Colombia, and Colin Firth, who spoke out against the eviction of the San tribe, and in favour of the Awa-Guajá people.

However, the media have not always been sympathetic towards the organisation. In 1995, the Independent Television Commission banned one of Survival International's advertisements, citing the Broadcasting Act 1990, which states that organisations cannot advertise their work if it is wholly or mainly of a political nature. The ad was broadcast on the music cable channel The Box and the MTV satellite offshoot VH-1. It featured Richard Gere urging viewers to help to stop the slaughter and exploitation of tribal people.

Another controversy ensued after an article in The Observer cast doubt on Survival International's reporting of an uncontacted tribe in Peru, which included a picture with tribesmen firing arrows up at an aircraft. After a heated confrontation that dragged for a couple of months, with threats of taking Survival International to court for libel, The Observer ended up conceding in August 2008 that it had got the story wrong. In a clarification, the newspaper stated: "While The Observer cannot be responsible for content of other media it does have a duty under the Editors' Code not to publish 'inaccurate, misleading or distorted information'. It failed in that duty here."

The previous Government of Botswana, with whom Survival International has had a long-standing disagreement over the government's treatment of the San people in the Central Kalahari Game Reserve, has complained about uneven coverage in the mainstream media. The San have challenged the government in court several times regarding their right to remain on their land without interference. Ian Khama, the former President of Botswana, stated that Survival International is "denying them and especially their children opportunities to grow with the mainstream", forcing Indigenous peoples into maintaining "a very backward form of life". It has been alleged that the Botswana government "has instructed all departmental heads in the state media to ensure that any negative reporting on the controversial relocations from the Central Kalahari Game Reserve (CKGR) should be contrasted strongly with freshly-sought government statements." However, the current President Duma Boko was part of the Bushmen's legal team in the 2006 court case, and is supportive of Survival's campaigns.

In 2005, Survival published the book There You Go! (Oren Ginzburg), which depicted a tribal society being harmed by development. In the book's foreword, Stephen Corry wrote: "The 'development' of tribal peoples against their wishes – really to let others get their land and resources – is rooted in 19th century colonialism ('We know best') dressed up in 20th century 'political correct' euphemism. Tribal peoples are not backward: they are independent and vibrant societies which, like all of us always, are constantly adapting to a changing world. The main difference between tribal peoples and us is that we take their land and resources, and believe the dishonest, even racist, claim that it's for their own good. It's conquest, not development. If you really want to understand what's going on, read this book."

== See also ==
- Cultural Survival
- Declaration on the Rights of Indigenous Peoples
- Friends of Peoples Close to Nature
- Songs for Survival

== Sources ==
- Hanbury-Tenison, Robin (1991). Worlds Apart: An Explorer's Life. Arrow Books. (First published by Granada, 1984)
