= Hessian Peace Prize =

German peace prize

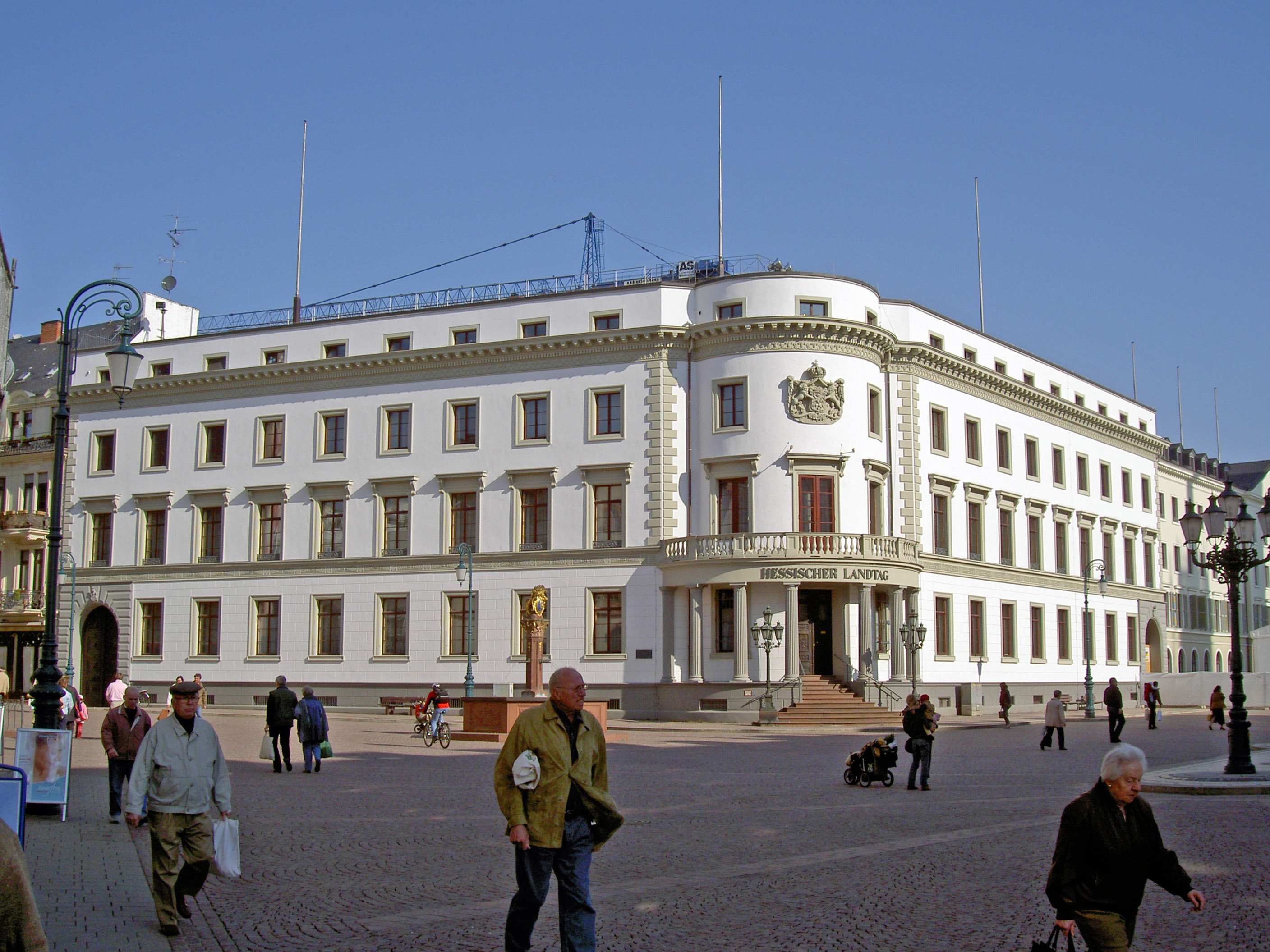
Wiesbaden Hessischer Landtag, location of prize ceremony

The Hessian Peace Prize (German: Hessischer Friedenspreis) is a German peace prize, awarded annually by the Albert Osswald foundation. Albert Osswald was a former Prime Minister of the state of Hesse. Established on 16 October 1993, the award has a prize money of €25,000. The recipient is selected by a committee. The Hessian Peace Prize is a dedication to international understanding and peace and recognizes commitment to peaceful conflict resolution. The prize ceremony takes place at the State Parliament of Hesse in Wiesbaden.

== Recipients ==
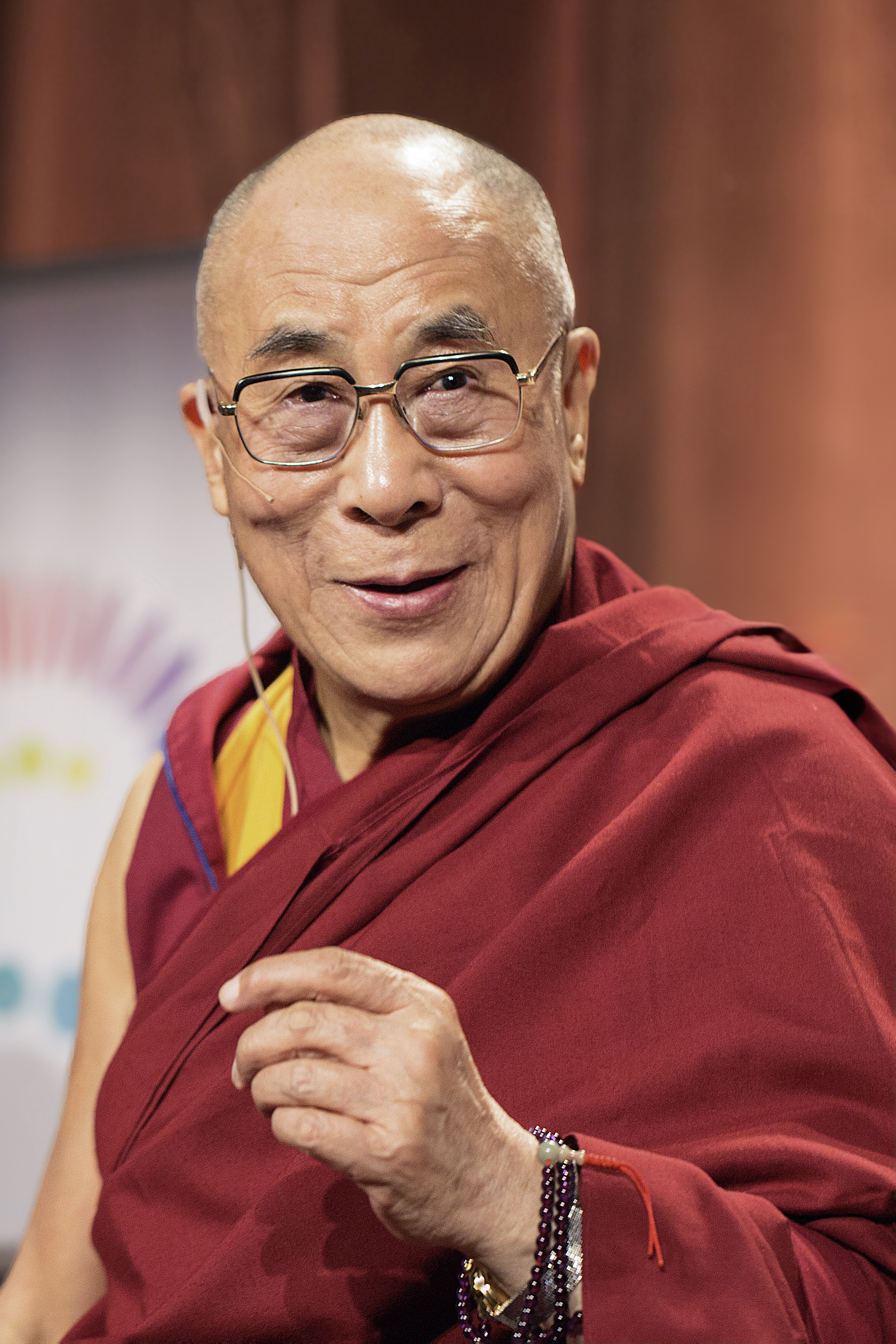
The Dalai Lama in 2012, recipient in 2005

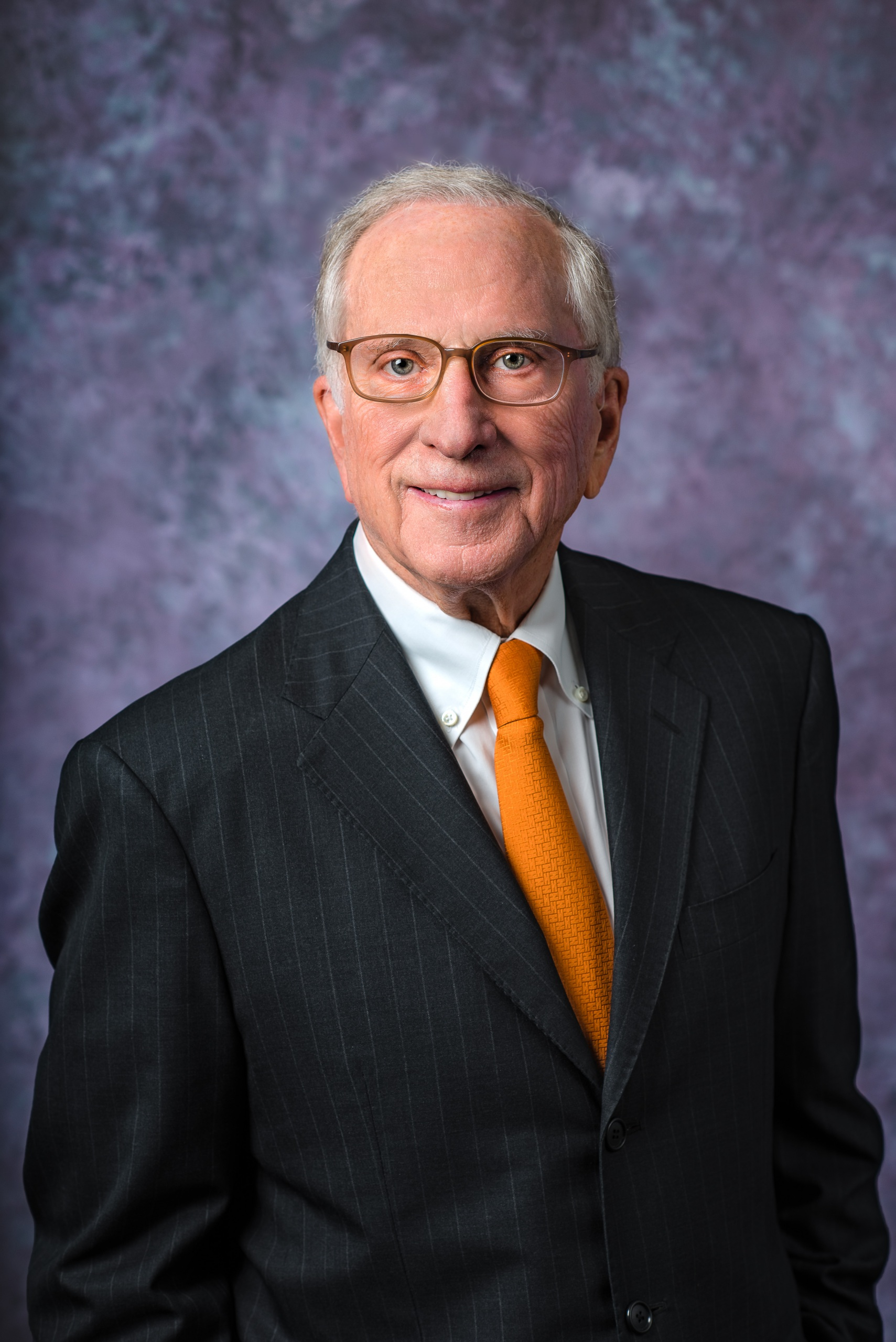
Sam Nunn portrait, recipient 2008

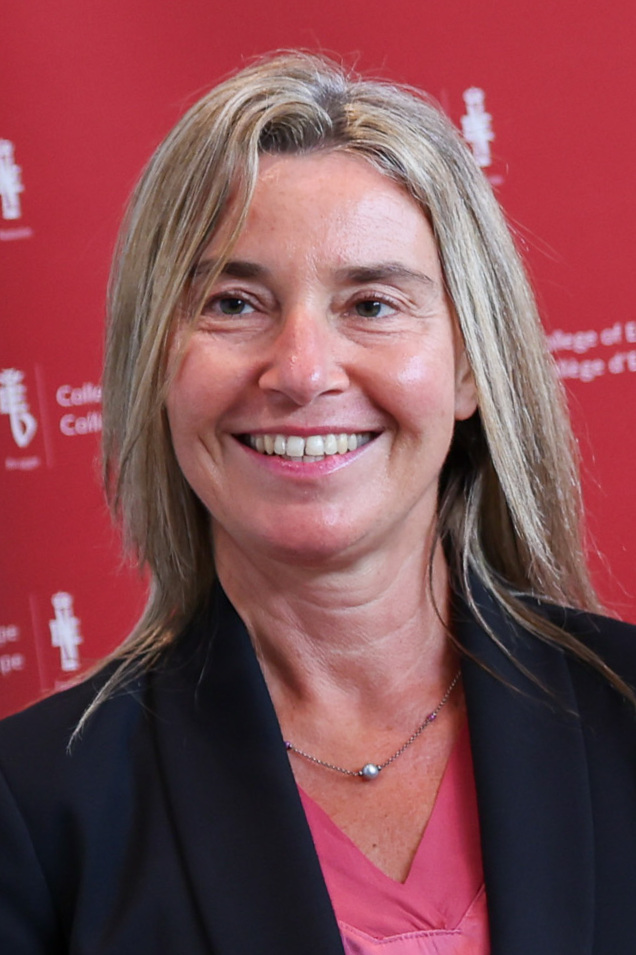
Federica Mogherini in 2024, recipient 2016

- 1994: Marianne Heiberg
- 1995: John Hume
- 1996: Gregorio Rosa Chávez
- 1997: Hans Koschnick
- 1998: Alexander Lebed
- 1999: George J. Mitchell
- 2000: Martti Ahtisaari
- 2001: Max van der Stoel
- 2002: no award
- 2003: Lakhdar Brahimi
- 2004: Hans Blix
- 2005: 14th Dalai Lama
- 2006: Daniel Barenboim
- 2007: Christian Schwarz-Schilling
- 2008: Sam Nunn
- 2009: Dekha Ibrahim Abdi
- 2010: Ismail Khatib
- 2011: Sadako Ogata
- 2012: Élisabeth Decrey Warner
- 2013: Muhammad Ashafa and James Wuye
- 2014: Rubem César Fernandes
- 2015: Ella Polyakova
- 2016: Federica Mogherini
- 2017: Carla Del Ponte
- 2018: Şebnem Korur Fincancı
- 2019 (2021 revocation) Abiy Ahmed
- 2020: Zoran Zaev and Alexis Tsipras
- 2022: Ilwad Elman
- 2023: Vivian Silver (posthum)
- 2024: Jani Silva
- 2025/2026: Nikol Pashinyan
