= Alexandria Process =

The Alexandria Process is a process of dialogue between Christian, Jewish and Muslim religious leaders in the Holy Land to build understanding and work towards peace.

== History ==
The process began when George Carey, Archbishop of Canterbury, was asked by then Israeli Foreign Minister Shimon Peres to try to convene a dialogue of religious leaders. This gathering of religious leaders included a meeting between Egyptian President Hosni Mubarak, and Israeli Prime Minister Shimon Peres. The two leaders signed the compromise of the Taba arbitration, reaffirming the notion of negotiation and dialogue to solve international affairs and disputes. Mubarak and Peres declared 1987 as a year of negotiations for peace.

The Alexandria Declaration was signed on 21 January 2002 by 17 religious leaders: six rabbis, five sheikhs and six bishops or their representatives.

Following the signing of the Alexandria Declaration, religious leaders of Islamic, Jewish, and Christian faiths convened in Washington D.C. The leaders endorsed the declaration and the sanctity of the holy land for all three faiths. Leaders at this conference included: Iman Shaker Elsayed, former imam of the Islamic Center of Washington, Rabbi David Saperstein, director of the Religious Action Center of Reform Judaism, Bishop Allen Bartlett, assisting bishop of the Episcopal Diocese of Washington, Imam Yayha Hendi, Muslim chaplain at Georgetown University, Rabbi Scott M. Sperling, regional director of the Mid- Atlantic Council, Union of American Hebrew Congregations, Fr. Peter Ruggere, Maryknoll Office of Peace and Justice, Imam Johari Abel, Muslim chaplain at Howard University, Bishop Felton Edwin May, United Methodist Church bishop of Greater Washington, Rev. Lynne Faris, National Presbyterian Church, Rev. Mark Brown, Director of Government Relations for the Evangelical Lutheran Church in America, and J. Philip Wogaman, Senior Pastor of Foundry United Methodist Church among others. This meeting was planned to take place at St. John's Episcopal Church, Lafayette Square, Washington, D.C., on 26 March 2002.

On 22 and 23 May 2004, the Alexandria Declaration was further discussed and a reform document with principles similar to the declaration was produced. The main issue the Arab world had with the Alexandria Declaration and the Greater Middle East Initiative was the forcing of sovereign countries to reform despite the continued Palestinian conflict. Seeing the Palestinian issue as an obstacle to reform, it was agreed at the Arab League summit that a solution had to precede major changes.

== Process ==
The process has two dimensions: internal, relating to the residents of Israel/Palestine, and external. Internally, the goal is to stimulate the ongoing dialogue between religious leaders. Externally, the process aims to involve the leaders of key Muslim countries.

A Permanent Committee for the Implementation of the Alexandria Declaration (PCIAD) was formed to support the implementation of the declaration. In January 2004, Israeli rabbis participated in a Muslim peace conference in Cairo which formed part of the Alexandria Process.

== Influence ==
Point 4 of the declaration did not achieve a religiously sanctioned ceasefire. Violence worsened in 2002 with Operation Defensive Shield, the Battle of Jenin and the 38-day April/May siege of the Church of the Nativity in Bethlehem. The network of religious leaders that had formed as a result of the Alexandria process, and the committees it established, contributed to the de-escalation of, and the resolution to, the siege of the Church of the Nativity.

Later, former Christian and Muslim extremist militants in Nigeria, Pastor James Wuye and Imam Muhammad Ashafa adapted the ideals of the Alexandria process to their own peacebuilding efforts, which placed an emphasis on tolerance, mercy, and pluralism. The same text as written in the Alexandria Summit was used, while place names were modified slightly to fit the context of the conflict in Nigeria.

A second interfaith conference was sponsored by the United Nations Alliance of Civilizations, and hosted by Spain in 2016 as a follow-up to the original Alexandria Summit. This meeting was characterized by the involvement of typically "mainstream" religious leaders including Israeli Chief Rabbi David Lau and co-founder of Hamas' military wing, Sheikh Imad Falouji. The declaration resulting from the collaboration of these approximately twenty Muslim, Jewish, and Christian religious leaders emphasized the "sanctity of life", and that both Israeli and Palestinian peoples had a right to live with dignity. The participants jointly asserted that disagreements should be decided solely through "negotiation and deliberation" rather than through violence.
