= Madeleine Memb =

Cameroonian journalist, radio producer, and feminist (born 1957)

- Born: July 14, 1957
- Occupations: Journalist; radio producer; women's rights activist

Madeleine Memb (born July 14, 1957), is a Cameroonian journalist, radio producer, and women's rights activist. Since 2006, she has been leading a project aimed at eliminating female genital mutilation in Cameroon.

== Career and activities ==
Madelaine Memb began her career as a journalist in 1992 at the national television and radio channel in Cameroon. She included reports on women's issues in her coverage and produced the radio program Au nom de la femme.

She also advocates for peace within the Economic and Monetary Community of Central Africa. In 2005, she co-founded Feminia with Léontine Babéni, a network for sharing information among media professionals. She leads various initiatives for the most disadvantaged groups, focusing on issues related to human, environmental, and food security, through two other associations of which she is a member, the International Association of Women in Radio and Television (IAWRT) and Medias Women of Peace.

She advocates for the criminalization of female genital mutilation in Cameroon, where the prevalence rate is estimated at 1.04%, but despite being identified in the regions of Maroua and Bafoussam, it is believed to affect the entire country. In 2023, she was a recipient of the German Africa Prize.
