= Golden Key International Honour Society =

American collegiate recognition society

- Founded: November 29, 1977; 48 years ago Georgia State University
- Type: Honor
- Affiliation: Independent
- Former affiliation: ACHS
- Status: Active
- Emphasis: All-discipline
- Scope: International
- Motto: Et reveles vestra potentiale "Unlock your potential"
- Pillars: Integrity, Collaboration, Innovation, Respect, Diversity, Excellence, Engagement
- Colors: Royal blue and Gold
- Chapters: 400+
- Members: 2,133,500 lifetime
- Headquarters: 4470 Chamblee Dunwoody Road, Suite 304; Dunwoody, Georgia 30338; United States
- Website: www.goldenkey.org

The Golden Key International Honour Society (formerly Golden Key National Honor Society) is an international collegiate honor society and non-profit organization based in the United States. It was founded in 1977 to recognize academic achievement among college and university students.

Golden Key has over 400 chapters at colleges and universities in Australia, The Bahamas, Canada, India, Malaysia, New Zealand, Singapore, South Africa, and the United States. It has initiated more than 2.1 million members.

== History ==
Golden Key National Honour Society was founded by James W. Lewis at Georgia State University in Atlanta, Georgia in 1977. The original intent of the society was to create a new academic honor organization that was the equal of longstanding honor societies such as Phi Beta Kappa, but which did not carry the same perceived elitism of older institutions, operating more strictly on merit standards (by accepting students in the top fifteen percent of their college classes and permitting part-time and transfer students who excelled academically).

The society expanded throughout the 1980s on a minimal budget, increasing the number of schools at which it had chapters and membership at those chapters. Lewis moved the institution's headquarters to a former Church of Christ Scientist building in the Druid Hills area of Atlanta in 1984. In the late 1980s, the society began attracting corporate sponsorships, providing data about its students to its sponsors, and holding large sponsored networking events, arguing that the strategy increased students' competitiveness in the job market.

Golden Key became an international society when it expanded to the University of Queensland in Brisbane, Australia in 1993. It changed its name to Golden Key International Honour Society in 2000 in order "to reflect [its] international presence".

Lewis, who by the late 1990s was making more than $300,000 as chairman of the organization, stepped down in January 2000 after being pressured by his board. He was replaced by Carl Patton who resigned in 2002 after a round of negative press coverage about the society. By 2002, the society was "one of the largest collegiate honor societies in the world", with an annual budget of US$10.9 million and over 120,000 inductees annually.

Golden Key sought and was denied acceptance to the Association of College Honor Societies (ACHS) in 1984 and 1997. Golden Key was accepted by the ACHS in 2005. In 2012, the society had 393 active chapters, 82,415 active members, and 2,106,099 total initiates. Golden Key resigned from the Association of College Honor Societies in December 2013 after what the ACHS indicated was "a series of on-going discussions and correspondence."

Golden Key's main office is in Dunwoody, Georgia, with regional offices in Sydney, Australia, and Pretoria, South Africa. It manages approximately 400 campus chapters worldwide. The organization operates as a non-profit under section 501(c)(3) of the U.S. Internal Revenue Code.

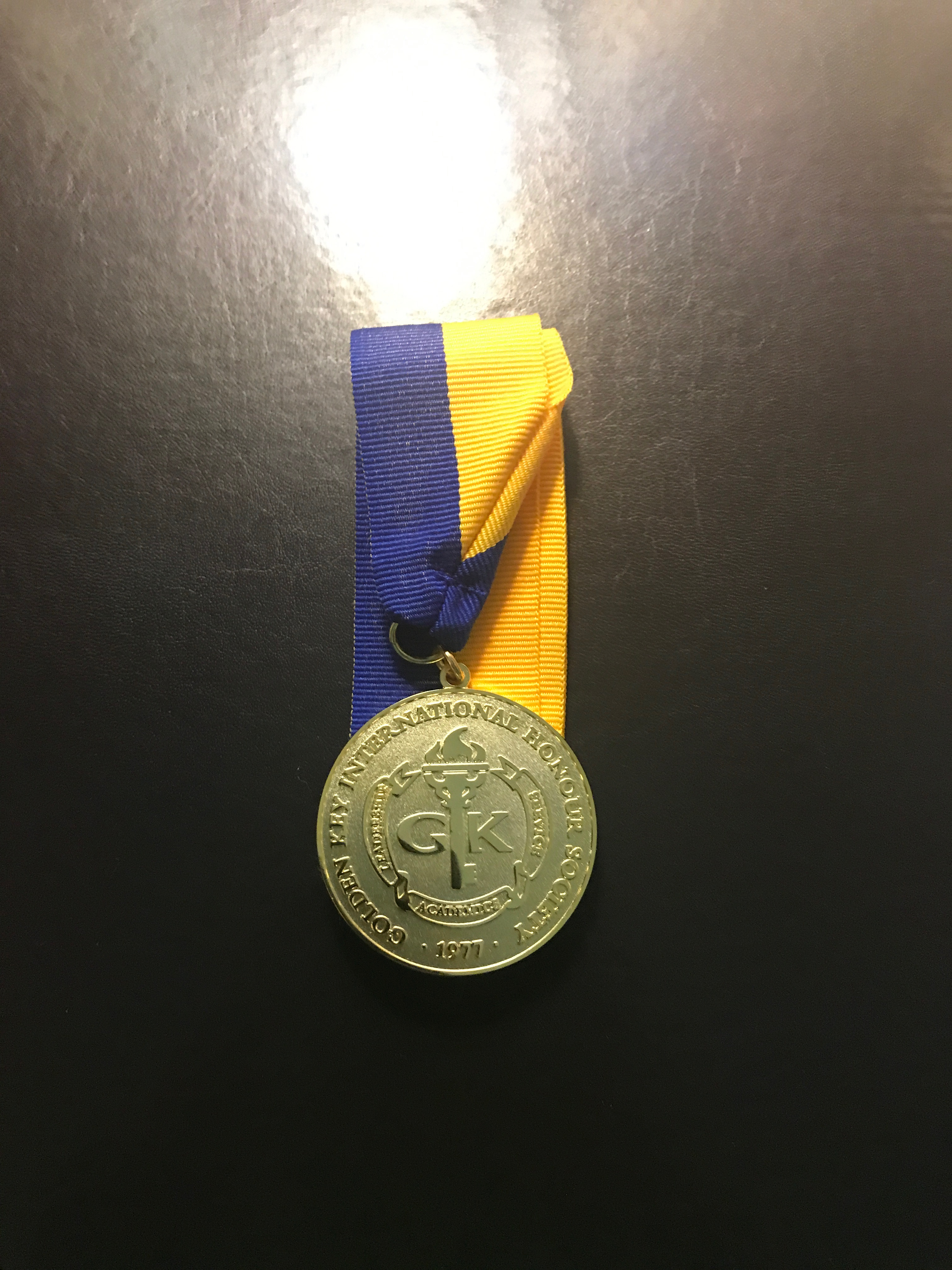
Golden Key medallion

== Symbols ==
Golden Key's motto is Et reveles vestra potentiale or "Unlock your potential". The society's core values or pillars are integrity, collaboration, innovation, respect, diversity, excellence and engagement.

At commencement, Golden Key members may wear a royal blue and golden yellow ribbon attached to their mortar board or a gold and royal blue cord. Its honor stole is a gold satin sash embroidered with a Golden Key logo in blue. The Gold Key medallion is gold colored and hangs from a ribbon that is royal blue and gold. Members who have the highest GPA in four undergraduate divisions may wear the medallion.

== Membership ==
Golden Key membership is open to sophomores, juniors, seniors, graduate students, and alumni who graduated in the past year. Membership is by invitation and is offered to students in any academic field who are in the top fifteen percent of their class and have a GPA of 3.75 or better. The society also awards honorary memberships to non-students who are impactful or noteworthy leaders on campus and in the university's community.

== Activities ==
In its early years, Golden Key anticipated volunteerism drives on college campuses by organizing community service efforts, such as working in soup kitchens, reading to children at libraries, and doing tax preparation help for low-income and immigrant populations. Since chapters are not centrally managed, charity and volunteer efforts are now fostered through a system called SPARK a Change, which allows chapters to determine the causes they support and the level of involvement of students.

Golden Key offers résumé and graduate program assistance, career planning and opportunities, leadership opportunities in local chapters, and networking events. It also offers scholarships, awards, research grants, travel support for academic conference attendance, and student loan debt relief to its members.

== Chapters ==
Golden Key has more than 400 chapters at colleges and universities in Australia, The Bahamas, Canada, India, Malaysia, New Zealand, Singapore, South Africa, and the United States. It founded chapters in the following countries in:

- 1977 – United States of America
- 1993 – Australia
- 1997 – Canada
- 1998 – Malaysia
- 1999 – New Zealand
- 2000 – South Africa
- 2010 – The Bahamas
- 2011 – India

== Notable members ==
=== Collegiate members ===
- Carlos Alvarado-Larroucau, author
- Anthony E. Clark, historian
- Michelle Deshong, indigenous Australian equality activist
- Neil Druckmann, video game designer
- Souzan El-Eid (1985), surgical oncologist
- Elaine, R&B singer
- Matthew Goldstein, chancellor of the City University of New York
- Gilbert Hegemier, professor emeritus of structural engineering at the University of California, San Diego
- Staci Keanan, attorney and actress
- Allison Kreiger, model and former Miss Florida
- Kára McCullough, Miss USA 2017
- Joe Nathan, professional baseball player
- Norman Robinson, television news reporter
- Field Ruwe, journalist and author
- Kate Steinberg, internet personality and television personality
- Leila Takayama, associate professor of Human–computer interaction at the University of California, Santa Cruz
- Quincy Tan, singer-songwriter

=== Honorary members ===
- Philip E. Austin (1998), economist and 13th president of the University of Connecticut
- Dean L. Bresciani (2010), 14th president of North Dakota State University
- Susannah Carr, television news presenter
- Bill Clinton, President of the United States
- Bill Cosby, comedian and actor
- Marcello Costa (1997), medical researcher, academic, and public health advocate
- Elizabeth Dole, United States Senate, U.S. Secretary of Transportation, and president of the American Red Cross
- Douglas Emlen (2012), evolutionary biologist and professor of biology at the University of Montana
- Peter J. Fos (2013), first president and sixth chief executive of the University of New Orleans
- Brian K. Hall, professor of biology at Dalhousie University
- Stephen King, author
- Kliff Kingsbury, professional football player and college football coach
- Marlene le Roux, disability and women's rights activist and CEO of the Artscape Theatre Centre
- Helene Marsh (2002), dean of graduate research studies and the professor of environmental science at James Cook University
- Nelson Mandela, President of South Africa
- Nomzamo Mbatha, actress
- Zareef Minty, South African politician and television personality
- Christopher Mott, College Football Hall of Fame and lecturer at the University of California, Los Angeles
- Dolly Parton, country musician
- Sev Ozdowski (2012), former Human Rights Commissioner and Disability Discrimination Commissioner for the Australian government
- Ronald Reagan, President of the United States
- Tupac Shakur, rapper
- Tim Tebow, professional football player
- Ian Thorpe, swimmer and Olympic Gold Medalist
- Desmond Tutu, Bishop of Johannesburg, Archbishop of Cape Town, anti-apartheid activist, and winner of the Nobel Peace Prize
- Akinyele Umoja (1995) educator and author
- Luc Vinet, physicist and mathematician
- Elie Wiesel, author, political activist, professor at Boston University, and winner of the Nobel Peace Prize

== Controversies ==
A 1999 article in the University of British Columbia student newspaper, The Ubyssey, examined the society's finances and scholarship practices after it established a chapter on campus in 1998. Ubyssey obtained the organization's IRS filings for 1997 and noted "Golden Key spent just $289,461 (US dollars) on scholarships, less than 5 percent of their total expenditures for the fiscal year ending June 30, 1997." Golden Key reported on its website in 2009 that it had increased scholarship disbursals to over $500,000 annually, but a later report indicated that spending on member events and scholarships in 2014 was less than $200,000. A 2002 report by The Chronicle of Higher Education reported that there were conflicts within the society's administration over the lowering of academic standards required for admission and inflated recruitment numbers from local university chapters. The society's aggressive marketing techniques toward eligible members were criticized in 2002 by the president of the National Collegiate Honors Council.

The business practices of Golden Key also attracted the Chronicle's notice, as well as that of The Washington Post. Sponsoring corporations, who paid a minimum of $55,000 a year (2002) to access Golden Key's membership lists, sent students "mass mailings for such products as credit cards and auto insurance." Golden Key responded to these criticisms by stating that it was standard practice among alumni groups and honor societies. The Chronicle quoted former employees who thought the institution's expenditures on parties and upper executive salaries, as well as its maintenance of the Druid Hills headquarters, were lavish and inconsistent with the former ideal of "a student-centered, nonprofit organization." The Atlanta Journal-Constitution reported poor accounting practices under Lewis's tenure in the late 1990s, and investigators were unable to determine exactly how much he was paid due to bookkeeping discrepancies. A 2016 investigation by Australian student newspaper Honi Soit found that Golden Key continued to release data about students, without their consent, to corporate sponsors.

Some students reported to student newspaper investigators that they were unsure of the society's benefits or did not find the society's networking opportunities worth the cost of membership. Honi Soit also noted that society staffers altered the Golden Key International Honour Society Wikipedia page to burnish the institution's image.

== See also ==
- Honor cords
