= Leila Takayama =

American acadeemic

Leila A. Takayama
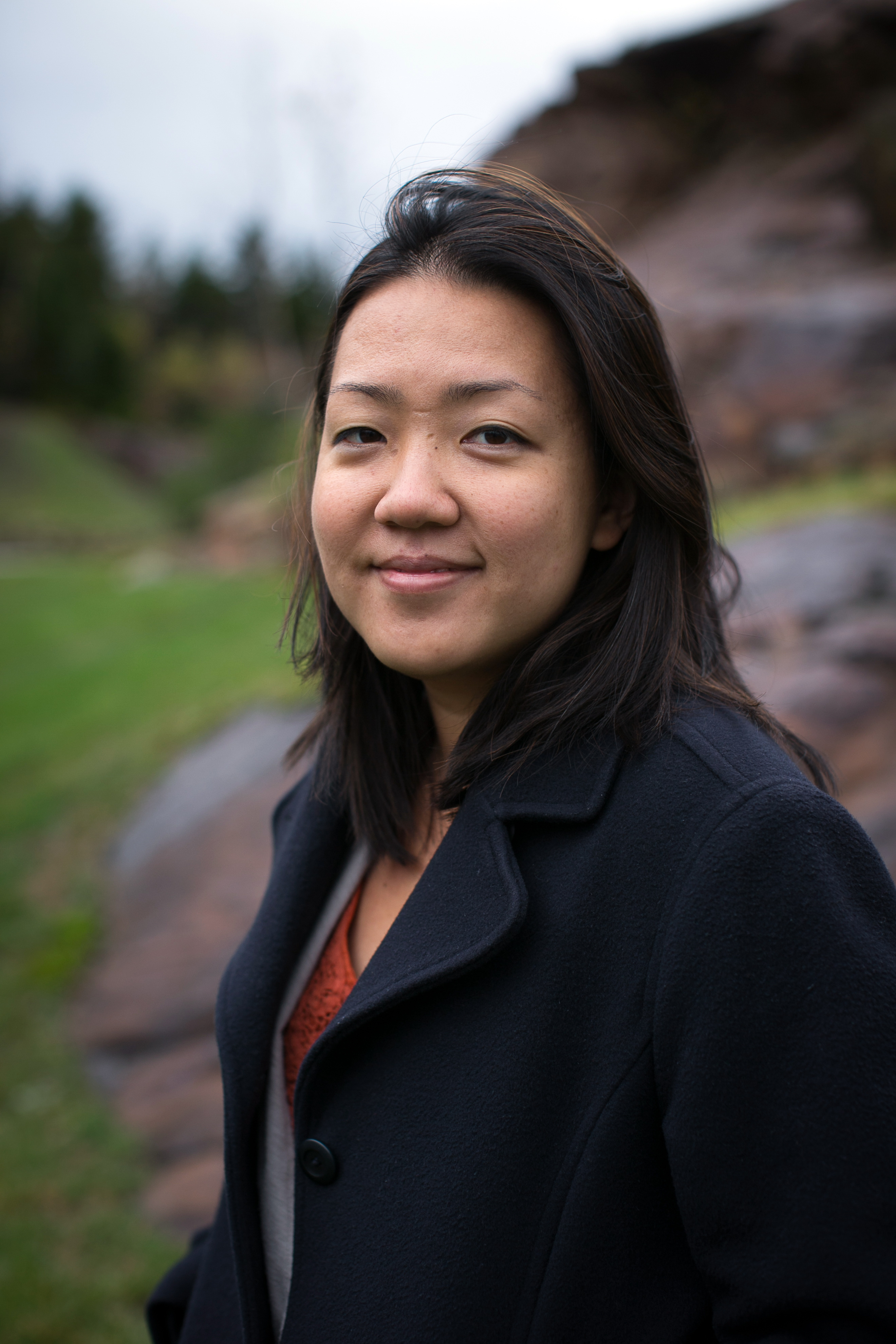
- Takayama in 2012
- Education: University of California, Berkeley; Stanford University
- Awards: Young Global Leader
- Scientific career
- Workplaces: University of California, Santa Cruz; Willow Garage; Google X Nokia Research
- Thesis: Throwing Voices: Investigating the Psychological Effects of the Spatial Location of Projected Voices (2008)
- Doctoral advisor: Clifford Nass

Leila A. Takayama is an associate professor of Human–computer interaction at the University of California, Santa Cruz. She has previously held positions at Google X and Willow Garage. She was elected as a World Economic Forum Young Global Leader in 2013.

== Early life and education ==
Takayama studied psychology at the University of California, Berkeley. She moved to the Communication between Humans and Interactive Media laboratory at Stanford University for her graduate studies, where she worked with Clifford Nass. She earned a Master's degree in Communication. During her Master's program, Takayama created general guidelines for the interaction design, which considered how to best integrate physical and computational systems. Her doctoral dissertation "Throwing Voices: Investigating the Psychological Effects of the Spatial Location of Projected Voices" was awarded the Nathan Maccoby dissertation award. She also worked on mobile phone communication and human-robot interaction. She was elected to Phi Beta Kappa, Golden Key International Honour Society and Psi Chi. During her studies, Takayama worked at the Palo Alto Research Center (PARC) in the User Interface Research group. After earning her PhD, Takayama joined Nokia Research, where she worked on the Innovation Design Experience Animate team.

== Research and career ==
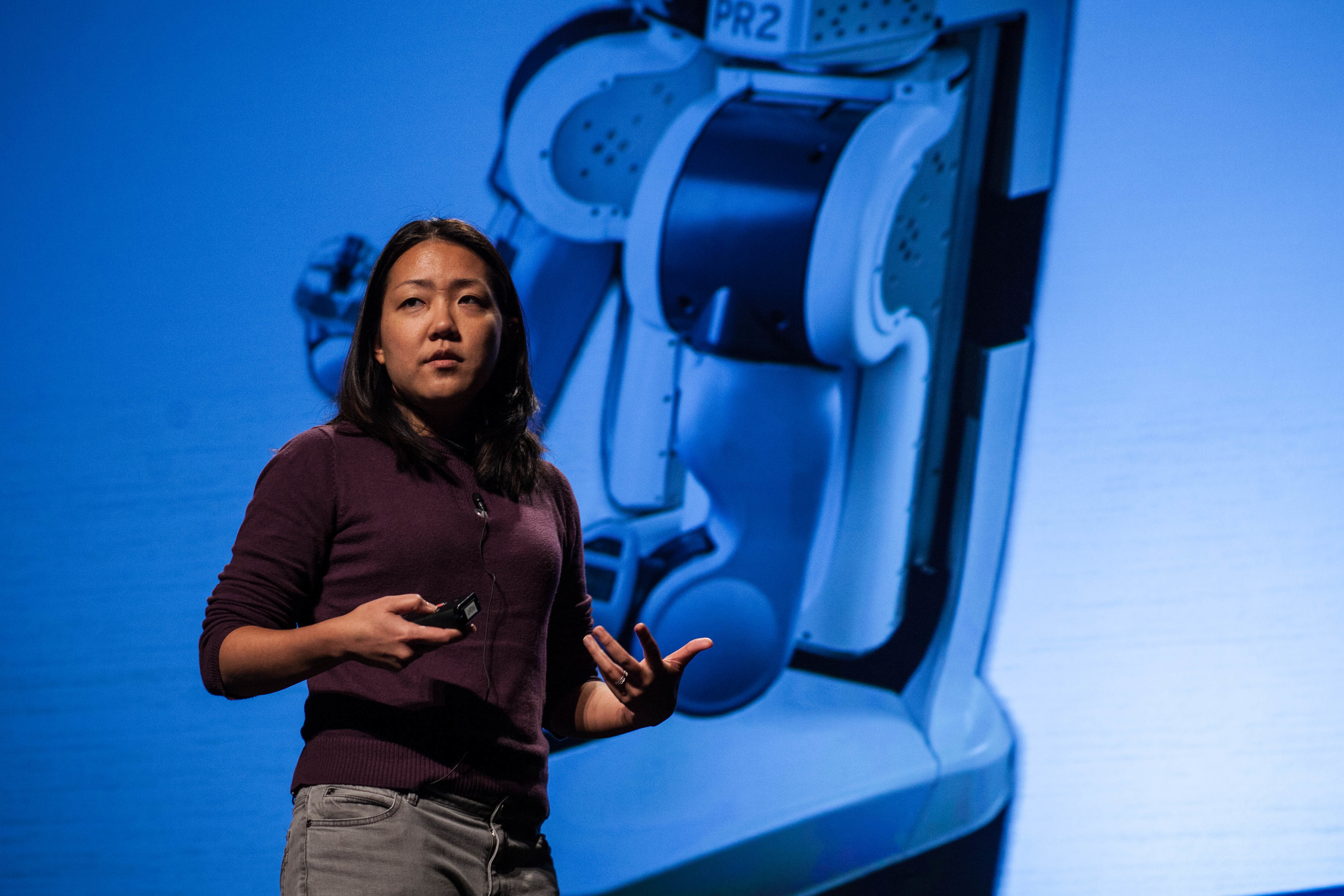
Takayama speaking at PopTech 2012

Takayama was manager of human–robot interaction at Willow Garage from 2009 to 2013. Here she studied human encounters with robots; and how to teach robots manners. She is interested in how people interact with non-human agents such as tele-operated robots and autonomous robots, and investigates these interactions using surveys, controlled experiments and interviews. Takayama was awarded a $10 million National Science Foundation grant for her Expeditions in Computing. She studied the social aspects of human–robot conflicts, and found that people preferred robots that disagreed when the voice did not come from its body but a separate control box, whereas if the robot was agreeing with them they preferred the voice to originate from their body. She demonstrated that setting low expectations for human–robot interactions resulted in less disappointment and a more positive review of a robot's competence.

Takayama joined Google X in 2013. There, she continued to investigate how people see and treat robots. She joined the faculty at University of California, Santa Cruz in 2016. She is a member of the Baskin School of Engineering’s Computational Media department. She investigates which dimensions most impact a user's willingness to provide feedback to a robot. Takyama holds a Hans Fischer fellowship at the Technical University of Munich.

Takayama is on the advisory board for Cobalt Robotics, Companion.AI and Suitable Technologies. In 2018 Takayama delivered a Tedx talk, What's it Like to Be A Robot?, in which she discussed how experimenting with robotics could result in a better understanding of ourselves. She has served on the World Economic Forum Global Agenda Council on Robotics and Artificial Intelligence.

=== Awards and honours ===
- 2019 Google Research Award
- 2015 IEEE Robotics and Automation Society, Early Career Award
- 2013 World Economic Forum Young Global Leader
- 2012 Technology Review 35 Innovators Under 35 (TR35)
- 2012 PopTech Science Fellowship
- 2012 Fast Company 100 Most Creative People in Business
- 2011 Silicon Valley 40 Under 40
