= Gilbert Hegemier =

American structural engineer

Gilbert Arthur Hegemier ASME Fellow
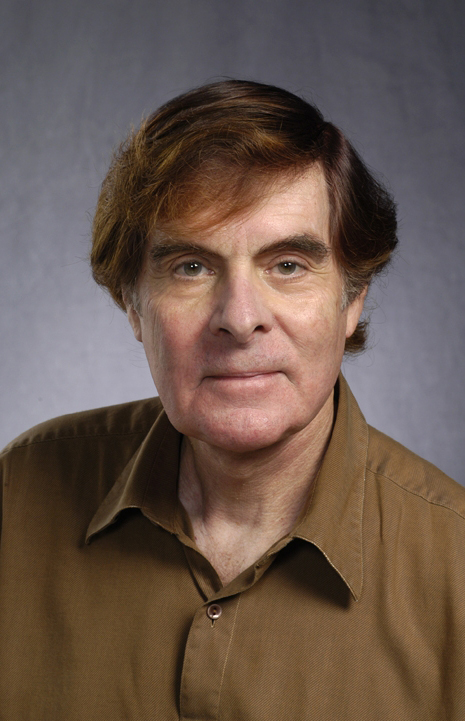
- Hegemier in 2024
- Education: California Institute of Technology (Ph.D., M.S.)
- Known for: Retrofitting techniques for earthquake safety, and the use of fiber-reinforced composites in construction
- Awards: The Revelle Medal (2022); CERF Charles Pankow Award for Innovation (1996); UCSD's Chancellor's Associates Shiley Achievement Award (1994)
- Scientific career
- Fields: Structural engineering, earthquake engineering
- Workplaces: University of California, San Diego
- Thesis: Stability of Thin Cylindrical Shells Subjected to a Class of Axially Symmetric Moving Loads (1964)
- Doctoral advisor: Ernest Edwin Sechler
- Other academic advisors: James. K. Knowles
- Years active: 1964-present
- Title: Distinguished Professor Emeritus

Gilbert Arthur Hegemier is an American engineer and academic known for his work in structural and aerospace engineering, as well as applied physics. He is a Distinguished Professor Emeritus at the Jacobs School of Engineering at the University of California, San Diego (UCSD), and is recognized as one of the founding faculty members of the institution. Hegemier's research has focused on enhancing public safety through the development of retrofitting techniques for structures in earthquake-prone areas, as well as on protective technologies against blast and ballistic threats. His contributions have been acknowledged by his involvement with professional organizations such as the American Institute of Aeronautics and Astronautics, the Earthquake Engineering Research Institute, and the American Society of Mechanical Engineers, where he has been a fellow since 1997.

== Biography ==
Hegemier earned his M.S. and Ph.D. in Solid Mechanics and Structures from the California Institute of Technology. Early in his career, he worked as a mechanical engineer at several organizations, including TRW Systems Space Technology Lab, the National Engineering Science Company, and the Naval Ordnance Laboratory. His professional focus shifted toward earthquake safety following the 1971 San Fernando Valley and 1972 Nicaragua earthquakes. At UCSD, Hegemier led a team that developed and tested full-scale bridge column retrofit systems. These systems were notably effective during the 1994 Los Angeles earthquake, helping to minimize damage to retrofitted bridges. His research also includes work on using lightweight fiber-reinforced composites for infrastructure repair and developing methods for blast mitigation to protect critical structures. Hegemier has received various awards for his contributions, including the 2022 Revelle Medal. He has been a fellow of the American Society of Mechanical Engineers since 1997 and is a member of the Earthquake Engineering Research Institute. In 1995, he was elected to the Golden Key International Honour Society.

In 1975, Hegemier achieved tenure as a Full Professor at UCSD, and in 2010, he was recognized with the title of Distinguished Professor. In 1986, he was instrumental in founding the Charles Lee Powell Structural Systems Laboratories at UCSD, where he served as the first Director. This facility supports full-scale experimental testing of various structural systems, including buildings up to five stories and large bridge segments. The laboratory was developed to enhance the Structural Engineering Program at UCSD, facilitate international research collaborations, and strengthen connections between academia and industry. Additionally, Hegemier and his colleagues expanded the lab's capabilities with a field station focused on explosive loading and an outdoor shake table, which is notable for being the world's largest and has been used for seismic tests on full-scale structures up to ten stories.

In 1998, the Department of Structural Engineering (SE) was established at UCSD, with Hegemier playing a key role in its creation. He later served as the department's chair from 2007 to 2012. Unlike typical civil engineering departments in the United States, SE at UCSD has a broader focus on structures, encompassing not only civil engineering but also aerospace and marine structures.

Hegemier has conducted significant research on protective technologies for civil structures, with a focus on engineering solutions for blast and seismic protection. His work includes the development of advanced fiber-reinforced composites, which have been used in retrofitting buildings to withstand both blast and seismic events. The effectiveness of these technologies was tested in full-scale experiments, including blast testing at White Sands Missile Range and seismic testing at UCSD Powell Laboratories.

Between 2003 and 2010, Hegemier directed a significant blast mitigation program in the United States, focusing on enhancing the safety and resilience of critical infrastructure. Funded by the Technical Support Working Group (TSWG) under the Combatting Terrorism Technical Support Office (CTTSO), this program involved extensive laboratory and field testing, along with advanced computational analysis. The aim was to develop protective technologies for essential structures, including buildings, bridges, tunnels, pipelines, and other critical systems.

Hegemier has contributed his expertise in blast damage mitigation to a variety of governmental and private organizations. His work has involved collaboration with entities such as the Technical Support Working Group (TSWG), the Department of Homeland Security's Transportation Security Administration, and the Port Authority of New York and New Jersey. Additionally, he has been involved in projects with national laboratories, including Lawrence Livermore and Sandia, as well as with companies like Science Applications International Corporation (SAIC), Parsons Brinkerhoff, Protective Technologies LLC, and Karagozian & Case. His experience also extends to participation in forensic investigations related to blast and seismic events.

Hegemier's research has received funding from various government agencies, including the Defense Advanced Research Projects Agency (DARPA), the Defense Threat Reduction Agency (DTRA), the Federal Highway Administration (FHWA), the California Department of Transportation (Caltrans), and the National Science Foundation (NSF). Additional support has come from the Air Force Office of Scientific Research (AFSOR), the Office of Naval Research (ONR), and national laboratories such as Los Alamos National Laboratory (LANL) and Lawrence Livermore National Laboratory (LLNL).

Hegemier played a significant role in transferring technology to industry by founding Composite Solutions, Inc., where he served as chairman for several years. The company was involved in multiple projects utilizing advanced Carbon Fiber Reinforced Polymer (CFRP) composites for civil structural retrofits and repairs. One notable project was the reinforcement of the Cheonggyecheon restoration project in South Korea, which involved the use of 14 miles (22.5 km) of CFRP strips to strengthen 5.5 km of a viaduct.

In 2024, Hegemier was honored by the UCSD by creating an endowed Chair in his name. In December the same year, he was named a Top Educator by Marquis Who's Who.

== Selected publications ==
=== Earthquake Engineering ===
- Hutchinson, T.C., Wang, X., Hegemier, G., Kamath, P., Meacham, B. (2021). Earthquake and Post-earthquake Fire Testing of a Mid-rise Cold-formed Steel Framed Building 1: Building Response and Physical Damage. ASCE Journal of Structural Engineering. doi:10.1061/(asce)st.1943-541x.0003097.
- Hegemier, G.A., Seible, F., Igarashi, A., Kingsley, G., Simulated Seismic Load Tests of a 5-Story Full Scale Reinforced Masonry Building, ASCE Journal of Structural Engineering, Vol.120, No.3 (March 1994), pp 903-924.
- Seible, F., Hegemier, G.A., Priestly, M.J.N., Innamorato, D., Seismic Retrofit of RC Columns with Continuous Carbon Fiber Jackets, ASCE Journal of Composites for Construction, May 1997, Vol. 1, No. 2, pp 52-62. (Best Paper Award).

=== Protective Technologies for Blast Loading of Structures ===
- Hegemier, G., et al., Protection of our Bridge Infrastructure against Man-Made and Natural Hazards, Structure and Infrastructure Engineering, December 2008, Vol. 4, No. 6, pp 415-429.
- Morrill. K. B., Hegemier, G.A., et al., Full-Scale Testing of Reinforced Concrete Column Retrofits to Resist Blast Loads, 10th International Symposium on Interaction of the Effects of Munitions with Structures, May 2001.
- Wolfson, J., Hegemier, G., et al., Blast Mitigation Techniques for Near Contact Charges on Cellular Steel Bridge Towers, Limited Distribution Proceedings of 81st Shock and Vibration Symposium (SAVIAC), 2011.

=== Use of Fiber-reinforced Polymer Composites in the Design of Civil Structures ===
- Hegemier, G., Stewart, L., Application of Fiber-Reinforced Polymers to Reinforced Concrete Bridges, Innovative Bridge Design Handbook, Edited by Alessio Pipinato, Elsevier, 2016, Chapter 30.
- Lee, CS., Hegemier, G.A., Phillippi, D.J., Analytical Model for Fiber-Reinforced Polymer Jacketed Square Concrete Columns in Axial compression, ACI Structural Journal, Vol. 107, No. 2, pp 208-217, March/April 2010.
- Seible, F., Hegemier, G.A., et al., The Carbon Shell System for Modular Short and Medium Span Bridges, Proceedings of the1997 International Composites Expo, Nashville, Tennessee, January 27-29, 1997, pp 3C-1 to 3C-6.

=== Modeling of Reinforced Concrete ===
- Murakami, H., Hegemier, G.A., On Simulating Steel-Concrete Interaction in Reinforced Concrete, Part 1: Theoretical Development, Mechanics of Materials, Vol. 5, 1986, pp 171-185.
- Hegemier, G.A., Murakami, H., On Global Shear Transfer Across a Crack or Joint Plane Penetrated by Continuous Fiber Reinforcement with Application to Reinforced Concrete, Int. J. Solids Structures, Vol. 26, 1990, pp 1115-1131.

=== Bridge Engineering ===
- Phillippi, D., Hegemier, G.A., Simplified Two-Column Analytically Based Fiber Model, ACI Structural Journal, March 2017, 114 (2) doi:10.14359/51689427
- Phillippi, D., Hegemier, G.A., Shear Loading in Two-Column Bridge Bents, ACI Journal, November 2014, 111 (6), doi:10.14359/51687168.

=== Composite Materials ===
- Shkoller, S., Hegemier, G.A., Homogenization of Plain Weave Composites Using Two-Scale Convergence, Int. J. Solids Struct., Vol. 32, NO. 6/7, 1996, pp 783-794.
- Murakami, H., Impelluso, T., Hegemier, G.A., Development of a Mixture Model for Nonlinear Wave Propagation in Fiber-Reinforced Composites, Int. J. Solids Struct., 1991, 19 pgs.
- Hegemier, G.A., Finite Amplitude Elastic-Plastic Wave Propagation in Laminated Composites, J. Appl. Phys., Vol. 45, No. 10, (1974), pp 4248-4253.

=== Geophysics ===
- Read, H.E., Hegemier, G.A., Strain Softening of Rock, Soil and Concrete, Mechanics of Materials, Vol. 3, 1984, pp. 271-294.
- Shkoller, S., Maewal, A., Hegemier, G.A., A Dispersive Continuum Model of Jointed Media, Q. Appl. Math., Vol. LII, No.3, 1994, pp 381-498.

=== Aerospace Structures ===
- Hegemier, G.A., Application of the Direct Method of Liapunov to a Class of Cylindrical Shell Stability Problems, in Thin Shell Structures: Theory, Experiment and Design, Y.C. Fung and E.E. Sechler (eds.), Prentice Hall, Inc., 1974, pp 83-101.
- Hegemier, G.A., Shkoller, S., Moesslacher, K.J., On the Prediction of Petal Evolution in Hypervelocity Impact Events, Proceedings of the 1998 ASME/JSME Joint Pressure Vessel and Piping Conference, ASME Pressure Vessels and Piping Div., Vol.373, pp 229-236.

== Awards and honors ==
- Albert Nelson Marquis Lifetime Achievement Award from Marquis Who's Who (2025)
- Named a Top Educator by Marquis' Who's Who (2024)
- In his honor, UCSD established an Endowed Chair in the name of “Gilbert A. Hegemier” in 2024
- The Revelle Medal (2022).
- CERF (Civil Engineering Research Foundation) Charles Pankow Award for Innovation (1996) Innovation (1996)
- UCSD Chancellor's Associates Shiley Achievement Award (1994)
- ASCE Best Paper Award (ASCE Journal) (1997)
- 1995-96 Teacher of the Year Award, UCSD School of Engineering
- Best Application Paper Award (Journal of Composites for Construction) (1997)
