= Khalili Foundation =

UK-based interfaith and intercultural charity

The Khalili Foundation
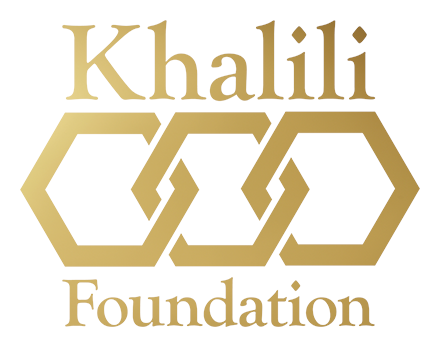
- Founded: 1995
- Founder: Professor Sir Nasser David Khalili
- Registration no.: 1044028
- Purpose: Interfaith dialogue, Intercultural dialogue
- Location: London, UK
- Region served: International
- Executive Director: Waqas Ahmed
- Website: www.khalili.foundation
- Formerly called: Maimonides Foundation

The Khalili Foundation is a UK-based charity promoting interfaith and intercultural understanding through art, culture and education. Its founder and chairman is the London-based philanthropist, art collector and scholar Sir David Khalili. A Persian Jew who grew up in Iran, he is notable for having the world's largest private collection of Islamic art. Established in 1995, the foundation has created interfaith and intercultural links through "cultural, academic, sporting and educational programmes".

== History ==
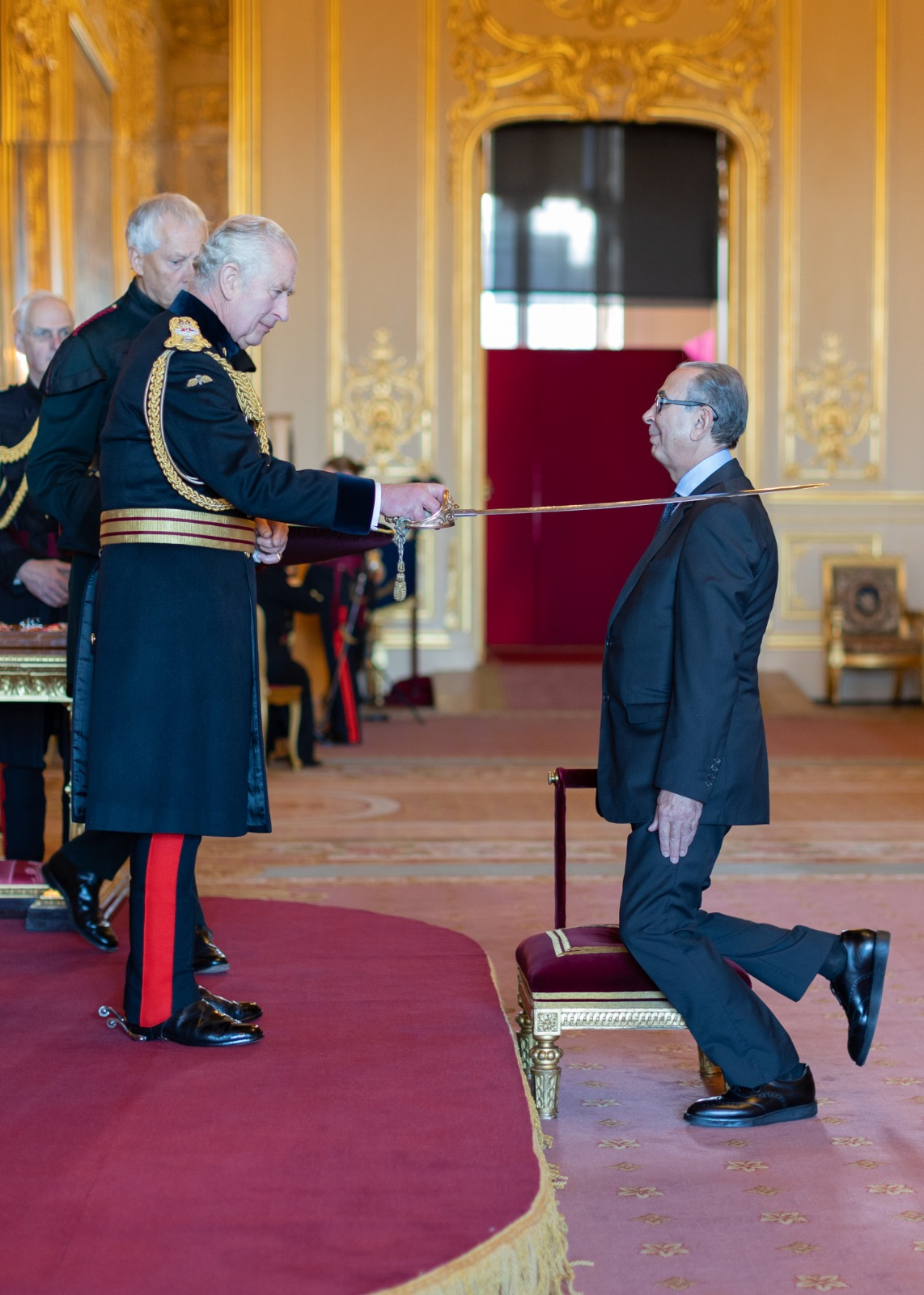
The investiture of Sir David Khalili presided by King Charles III "for services to interfaith relations and charity" at Windsor Castle

The foundation was registered with the Charity Commission in 1995, having previously been named the Maimonides Foundation after Moses Maimonides, a 12th-century philosopher, theologian and leader of the Jewish faith. Maimonides wrote positively about Christianity and Islam was thus taken by Khalili as inspiration for the name.

In the aftermath of the September 11th attacks in the United States, according to Mehri Niknam, Executive Director of what was then named the Maimonides Foundation, "everyone told us it would be impossible to co-operate with Muslims." Instead they intensified their effort of promoting inter-cultural understanding. Niknam said at a conference about the attacks that "religions cannot be isolationist, cultures must develop or stagnate, and communities need to interact."

Sir David Khalili was appointed as a UNESCO Goodwill Ambassador in 2012 for "his outstanding commitment to the promotion of peace through education and culture". The foundation was mentioned when he was knighted "for services to interfaith relations and charity" in the Queen's birthday honours for 2020. Niknam was made a Member of the British Empire (MBE) in 2005 for her work as director of the charity.

== Partnerships ==
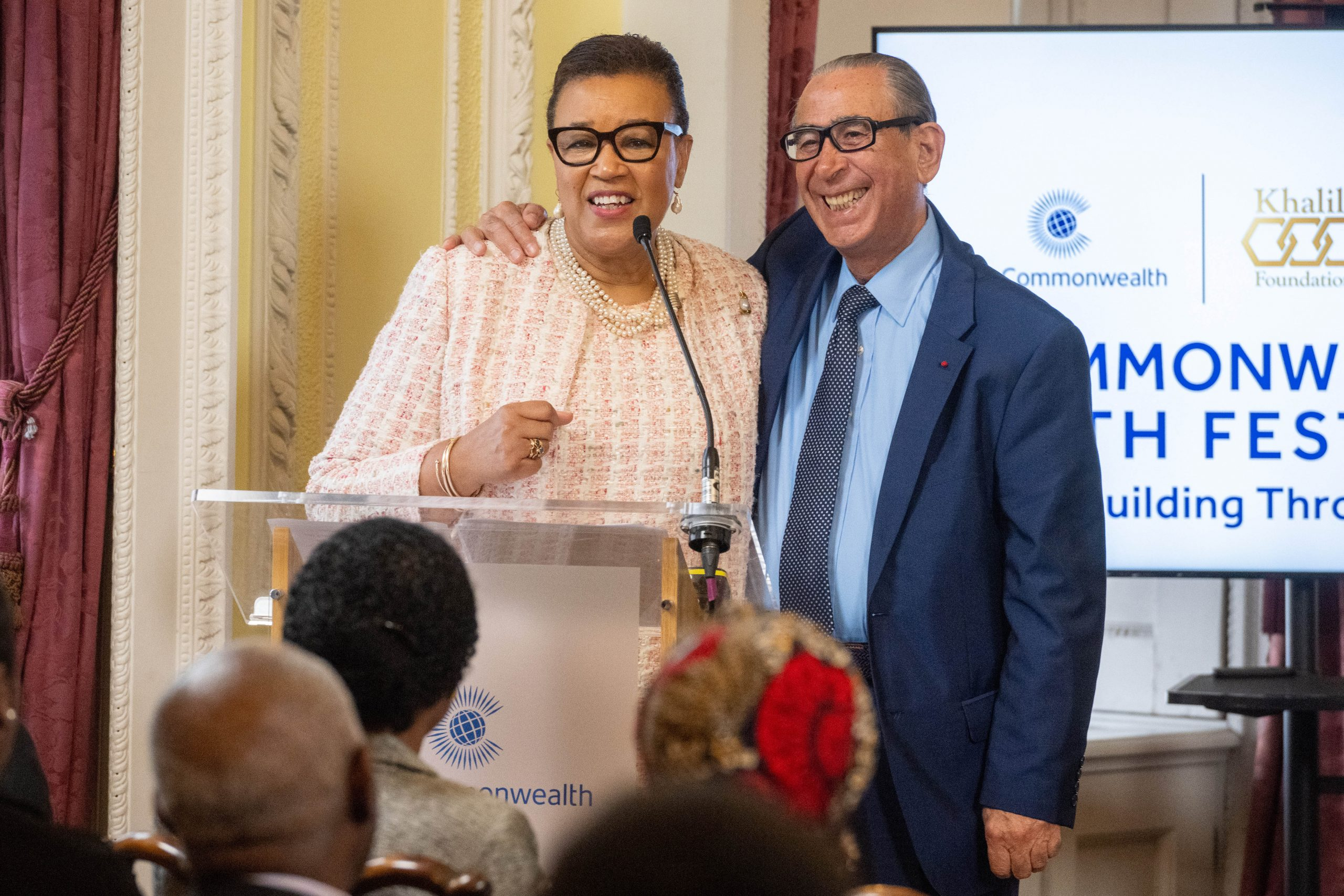
Baroness Patricia Scotland and Sir David Khalili at the launch of the Commonwealth Faith Festival, 8 February 2024

Faith in the Commonwealth is a global citizenship education project started and overseen jointly by the Commonwealth and the Khalili Foundation. It gives peace activism workshops to people from the ages of 15 to 29 from different faith backgrounds, including those of no faith, supporting them in developing social action projects within their communities. These projects address topics such as hate speech, girls' education, and indigenous people's rights. Workshops have taken place in Kenya, Bangladesh, Cameroon, Uganda, and the Caribbean.

The Khalili Foundation has partnered with the King's Trust and its Mosaic Initiative to support global citizenship events for young people. The foundation gave "global citizenship training" to young people in the UK as part of the trust's Young Leaders Programme. These trainees ran a series of Youth Summits for people from 22 Commonwealth countries on themes including education and sustainable development.

To celebrate the twentieth anniversary of the UNESCO Universal Declaration on Cultural Diversity, the Khalili Foundation, in association with UNESCO, produced and published a book of essays on cultural diversity by intellectuals, artists, and leaders including Antonio Guterres, Patricia Scotland, Michelle Bachelet, David Adjaye, Sami Yusuf, Peter Gabriel, Jimmy Wales, Daniel Barenboim, and Vandana Shiva.

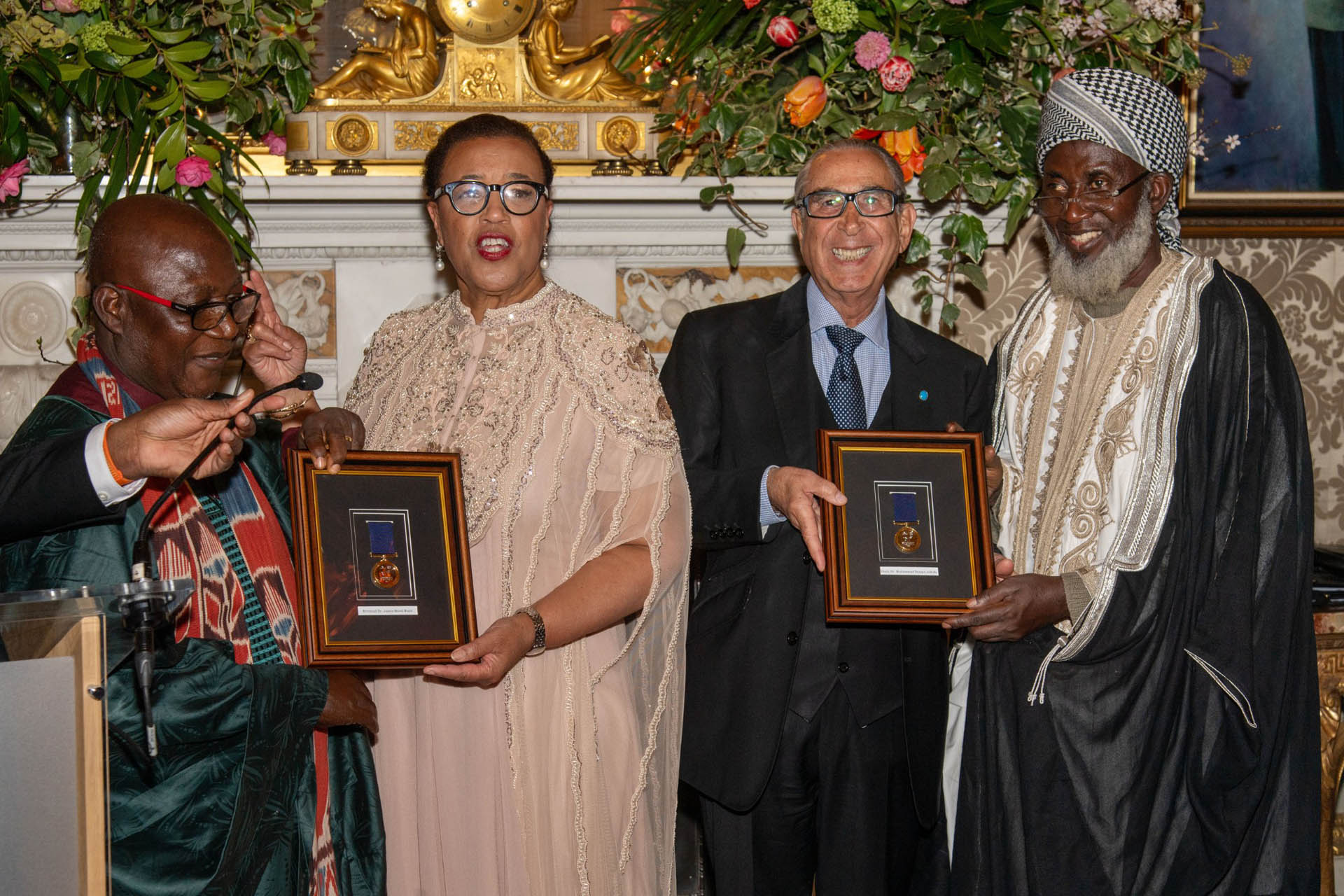
Presentation of the first Commonwealth Peace Prize to the joint winners Pastor James Wuye (left) and Imam Muhammad Ashafa (right) by Baroness Scotland and Sir David Khalili

In March 2024, Baroness Patricia Scotland and Sir David Khalili announced the Commonwealth Faith Festival, a programme that includes training with awards for peace-building projects. In March 2025 the award of the first Commonwealth Peace Prize was given to Pastor James Wuye and Imam Muhammad Ashafa. The award included a £50,000 prize for their Interfaith Mediation Centre.

The Khalili Foundation is a founding supporter of The King's Commonwealth Fellowship Programme delivered through the Association of Commonwealth Universities. The programme offers undergraduate and doctoral scholarships, as well as climate resilience fellowships, to students and professionals in the Commonwealth's Small Island Developing States.

== Interfaith programmes ==
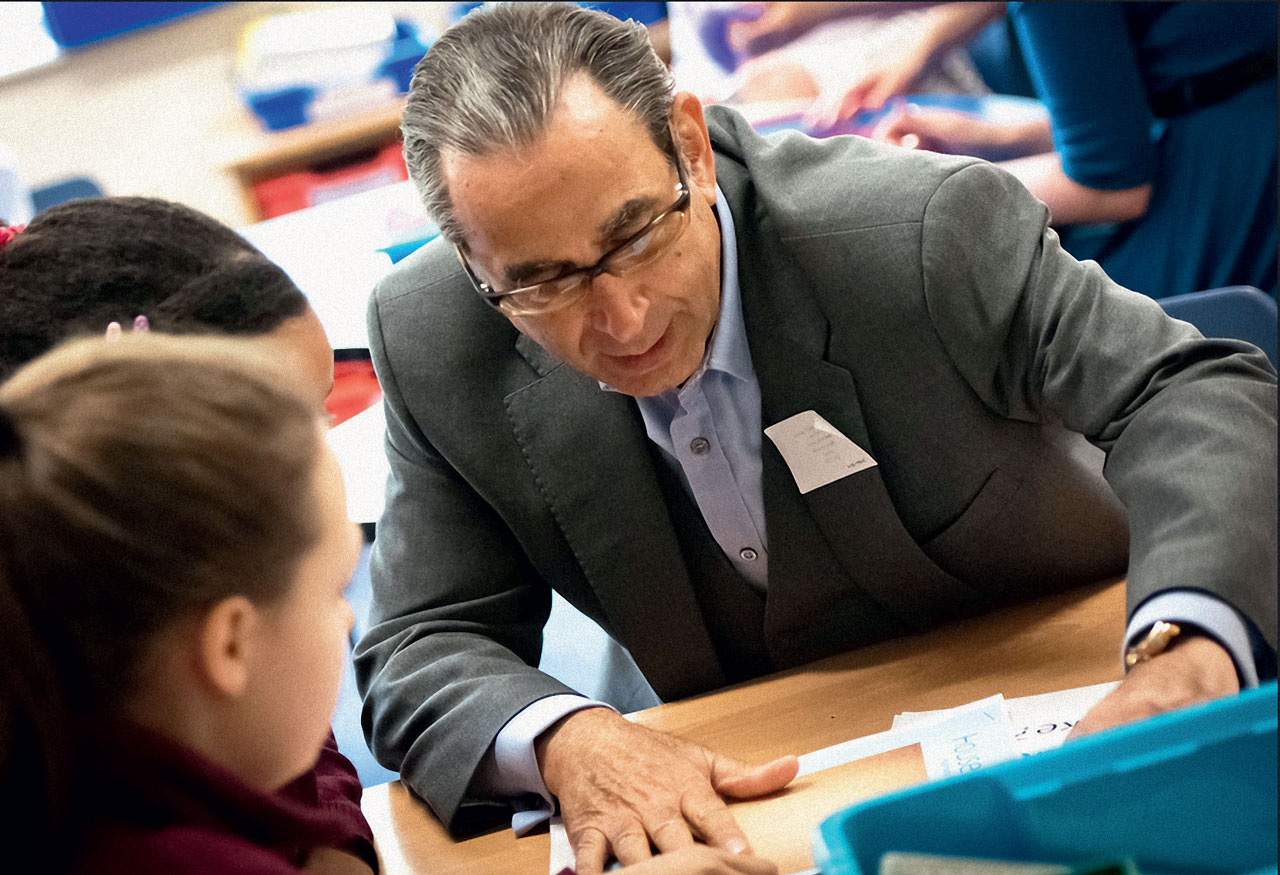
Khalili at the 2012 launch of the Interfaith Explorers educational materials

=== Interfaith Explorers ===
Interfaith Explorers is a UNESCO-supported online educational resource for children aged 10 to 11, teaching about Christianity, Islam, and Judaism. The course is freely offered to schools and supported by four hundred online videos. Begun in 2012, it has been promoted in 18,000 primary schools in England and Wales and to UNESCO's international network of 13,500 schools. Interviewed in 2012, Khalili said that it is important to show children the similarities between Abrahamic religions at an early age: "We have no choice but to start now. If we don’t, in twenty to thirty years we’ll be sitting down here having the same conversation about the Middle East problem."

=== Schools programme ===
The schools programme brings Jewish and Muslim school students together to discuss inter-faith and cultural issues. It was introduced in 2003, when Jewish sixth formers from Immanuel College visited Muslim students in Brondesbury College, along with staff from both schools. The students were given a talk on the similarities between the history and the culture of the Jewish and Muslim people. The message of the talk was "harmonious co-existence and good citizenship in the United Kingdom". The foundation has provided speakers for schools and student groups to promote discussion of topics including social inclusion, antisemitism and Islamophobia.

The foundation has paid for 3,000 copies of an English book based on Quranic stories of Joseph and Moses to be translated into Arabic and distributed to school children on the West Bank. This is intended to show Muslim and Jewish children the shared heritage of the religions. Forty thousand free copies of Khalili's textbook on Islamic art – 20,000 each in English and in Arabic – have been distributed by the foundation in the UK and in Muslim countries to promote understanding of Islamic heritage.

=== Football programme ===
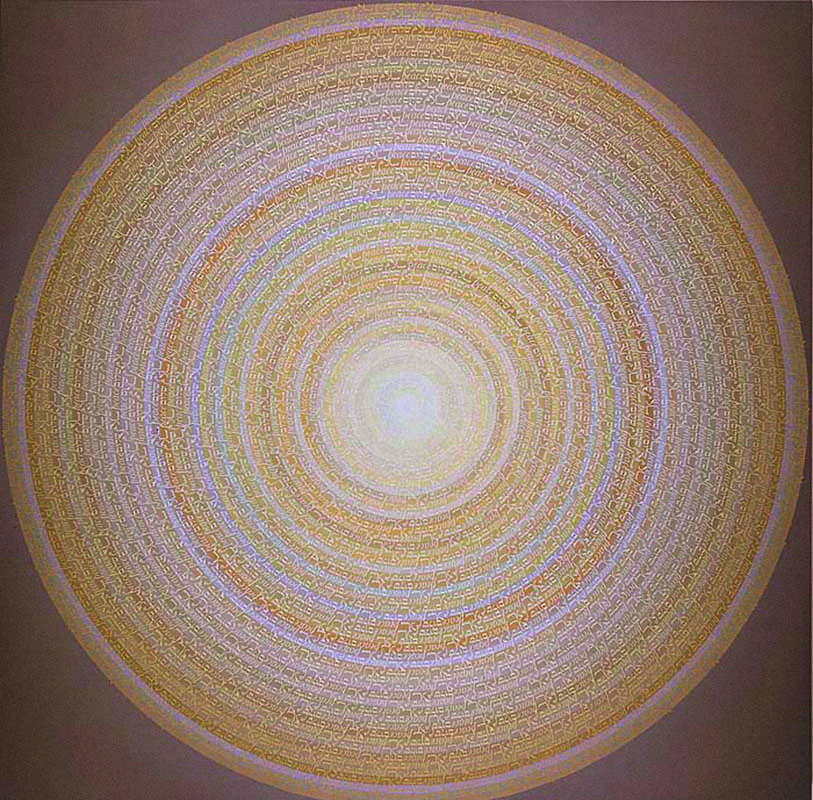
The Circle of Piece, a painting by the British artist Ben Johnson designed by Khalili as a kaleidoscope of the word "peace" in Hebrew, English, and Arabic.

The football programme began in 1990, with Jewish and Muslim children aged 9 to 12 playing football on Sunday mornings for three weeks. The children, from both secular schools and faith schools, play in mixed-faith teams. Parents attend the matches, bringing adults from both communities together. The Arsenal football club has supported this cause by providing training and allowing the use of their stadium in North London. The foundation also trains young people to act as football coaches in their own communities.

=== International visits ===
The foundation has sent representatives to the Middle East, encouraging prominent figures and officials from both Judaism and Islam to attend each other's places of worship. Chief Rabbi Jonathan Sacks and Sheikh Zaki Badawi are among those who have travelled internationally, supported by the foundation, to attend mosques and synagogues. The foundation has also brought Jewish and Muslim academics together in theology seminars and lectures.

=== Academic programmes ===
The programmes include theology seminars, academic lectures, and a Jewish-Muslim lecture series.

=== Art programmes ===
One of the foundation's art programmes, Dialogue Through Art, creates an opportunity for Jewish and Muslim students to collaborate on an art project. It also offers students a positive experience of both Jewish and Islamic heritage through joint visits to relevant art exhibitions and museums.
