= Quincy Tan =

Malaysian singer-songwriter

Quincy Tan Jin Hong 陈仁丰
- Born: Quincy Tan Jin Hong; January 10, 1982 (age 44)
- Origin: Kajang, Selangor, Malaysia
- Genres: Mandarin pop
- Occupations: Singer-songwriter, artiste
- Instruments: Piano, electone-organ, guitar
- Years active: 2006–present (singing)
- Labels: MMC (mainstream music)
- Website: 陈仁丰音乐桃花源

Quincy Tan Jin Hong (simplified Chinese: 陈仁丰; traditional Chinese: 陳仁豐; pinyin: Chén Rénfēng; Jyutping: Can4 Jan4 Fung1; Pe̍h-ōe-jī: Tân Jîn-hong; born January 10, 1982), is a popular Malaysian singer-songwriter who won Best Newcomers in the 8th Asia New-Singer Singing Competition in Shanghai, China in 2005. In March 2006, he released his debut EP titled Quincy 陈仁丰 EP2006.

== Biography ==
Quincy Tan was born in Kuala Lumpur on January 10, 1982. His musical ability had been noticed as a young child. Since then, he taught himself to play the Electone organ, piano and guitar. He was named Champion in a Yamaha Electone Organ Competition in primary school and amazed the professional judges by his self-learning and learn-by-ear abilities.

Besides music, Tan was active in sports as a teenager. He played volleyball, and participated in track and field. He composed his first song at the age of sixteen.

Tan studied Electronics Engineering at Multimedia University. He graduated in 2006 with a First Class Honours Degree and is a member of the Golden Key International Honour Society; his academic fees were covered by scholarships for excellent academic achievement. His music talent was spotted in 2002 by his current record label, Mainstream Music, a fee for service artistic development label. He had professional vocal training and music composing before starting his professional musical career in 2006.

== Music career ==
In 2001 while studying at Multimedia University, in Cyberjaya, Malaysia, Tan was noticed by the record company during a Talent-Search audition. He was offered a contract, but opted instead to complete his engineering degree, ultimately rejecting the offer.

In 2005, Quincy Tan represented Malaysia competing against musicians from 14 Asia countries' in the 8th Asia New-Singer Singing competition, at Shanghai China where he won the Best Newcomer Award. This gave Tan greater recognition.

In March 2006, Quincy Tan released his 1st debut EP, 《Quincy 陈仁丰 EP2006》. His compositions 谢谢你捧场 (Thanks for your support) and 幸福意外 (Unexpected Wound) have gained attention and popularity throughout Malaysia. Within 8 months after he released his EP in Malaysia, he received a Bronze Medal newcomers in PWH (Entertainment Journalist Association) Music Awards and his 幸福意外 (Unexpected Wound) was nominated in Top 10 Golden Melody Awards (International Group), and 桃花源 (Utopia) was nominated in Best Song Production.

== Discography ==
- Quincy 陈仁丰 EP2006 (2006)
- 音乐故事 (2007)
- 丰の乐 (2008)

== Awards ==
Year	Awards
2005	Champion, 1st Asia New-Singer Singing Competition (Malaysia Round) 金奖,第一届亚洲新人歌手大赛 (马来西亚); Best Potential Singer, 1st Asia New-Singer Singing Competition (Malaysia Round) 最佳潜质新人奖,第一届亚洲新人歌手大赛 (马来西亚); Best newcomers, 8th Asia New-Singer Singing Competition 第八届亚洲新人歌手大赛
2006	Bronze Medal newcomers, 11th Persatuan Wartawan Hiburan (PWH) Music Awards 新人推荐铜奖,娱协奖
