= Azim Nanji =

Kenyan-born professor of Islamic studies

Azim Nanji is a Kenyan-born professor of Islamic studies. From 1998 until 2008, he served as director of The Institute of Ismaili Studies in London, England. He is also on the board of directors of the Global Centre for Pluralism a joint partnership between His Highness the Aga Khan and the Government of Canada.

== Biography ==
Born in Nairobi, Kenya, Nanji attended schools in Kenya, Tanzania, and Makerere University in Uganda, and received his master's and doctoral degrees in Islamic Studies.

Nanji has held academic and administrative appointments at various American and Canadian universities. Since 1998, he has been with the Institute of Ismaili Studies, a research institute which aims to promote scholarship and learning of Muslim cultures and societies, with a view towards attaining a better understanding of Islam and its relationship with other societies and faiths.

In 1988, he was Margaret Gest Visiting Professor at Haverford College, Pennsylvania, US, and a visiting professor at Stanford University, California in 2004.

Nanji has served as co-chair of the Islam section at the American Academy of Religion and on the editorial board of the Academy's Journal. He has also been a member of the Philanthropy Committee of the Council on Foundations and has been the recipient of awards from the Rockefeller Foundation, the Canada Council, and the National Endowment for the Humanities.

Within the Aga Khan Development Network, Nanji has served as a member of the Steering Committee and Master Jury of the Aga Khan Award for Architecture, and as a task force member for the Institute for the Study of Muslim Civilizations (AKU-ISMC), and continues as Vice Chair of the Madrasa-based Early Childhood Education Programme in East Africa.

== Publications ==
Professor Nanji has authored, co-authored and edited several books including:

- The Nizari Ismaili Tradition (1976),
- The Muslim Almanac (1996),
- Mapping Islamic Studies (1997)
- The Historical Atlas of Islam (with M. Ruthven) (2004)

In addition, he has contributed shorter studies and articles on religion, Islam and Ismailism in journals and collective volumes including the Encyclopædia of Islam, Encyclopædia Iranica, Oxford Encyclopædia of the Modern Islamic World, and A Companion to Ethics. He is also the Associate Editor for the revised Second Edition of The Encyclopaedia of Religion. As of 2007, he was preparing a Historical Dictionary of Islam to be published by Penguin.
