= Global Centre for Pluralism =

Coordinates: 45.430602°N 75.698746°W

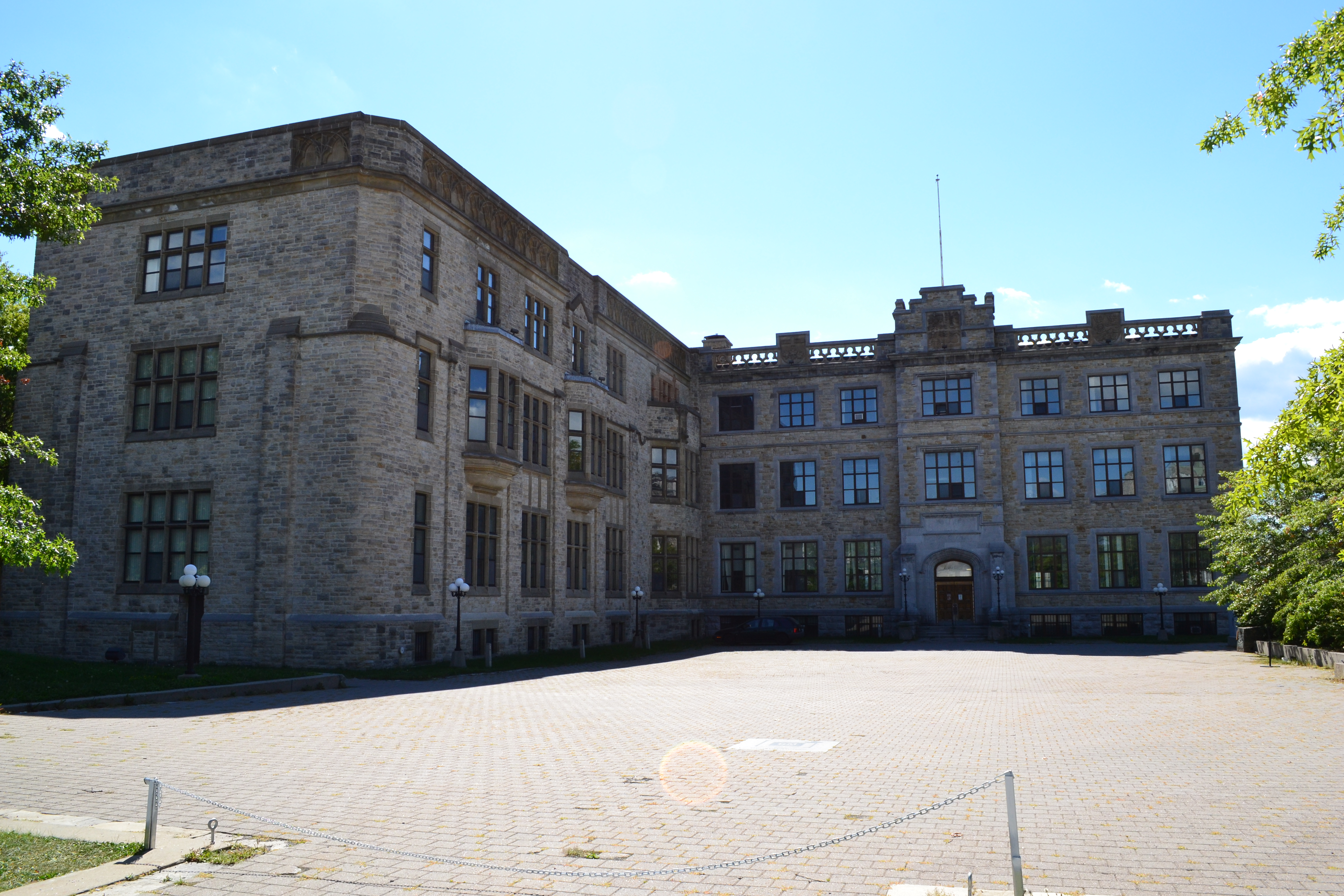
Current home of the Global Centre for Pluralism on Sussex Drive, Ottawa.

The Global Centre for Pluralism (French: Centre mondial du pluralisme) is an international centre for research, education and exchange about the values, practices and policies that underpin pluralist societies. Based in Ottawa, Ontario, Canada, the Centre seeks to assist the creation of successful societies.

The Global Centre for Pluralism is an international initiative of Aga Khan IV, 49th hereditary Imam of Nizari Ismaili Muslims, and was established jointly with the Government of Canada in 2006. It is located in the former Canadian War Museum building along Ottawa's Sussex Drive and was officially opened with Governor General of Canada, the Right Honourable David Johnston on May 16, 2017.

== Board of directors ==
The Board of Directors of the Global Centre for Pluralism are the following:

- His Highness the Aga Khan, (Chair of the Board) Chair of the Aga Khan Development Network (AKDN) and 50th hereditary Imam of the Shia Ismaili Muslims;
- Princess Zahra Aga Khan, Head of the AKDN's Social Welfare department;
- The Right Honourable Adrienne Clarkson, former Governor General of Canada;
- Huguette Labelle, Chancellor of the University of Ottawa;
- Azim Nanji, Senior Associate Director for the Abbasi Program in Islamic Studies at Stanford University;
- Khalil Shariff, Chief Executive Officer of the Aga Khan Foundation Canada;
- Mike DeGagné, President & CEO of Indspire;
- Kim Ghattas, Emmy-award winning journalist, analyst, and author;
- Rohinton P. Medhora, former president of the Centre for International Governance Innovation (CIGI);
- James Irungu Mwangi, is the Executive Director of the Dalberg Group;
- Marty Natalegawa, former Foreign Minister of the Republic of Indonesia; and
- Deborah Yedlin, President and CEO of the Calgary Chamber of Commerce.

Directors Emeriti:

- His late Highness the Aga Khan, 49th hereditary Imam of the Shia Ismaili Muslims
- Kofi Annan, former Secretary General of the United Nations;
- Iain Benson, Canadian lawyer and Professor of Law at the University of the Free State in Bloemfontein;
- Margaret Ogilvie, Chancellor's Professor of Law, Carleton University;
- Eduardo Stein, diplomat and former Vice President of Guatemala;
- Rudyard Griffiths;
- Yash Pal Ghai, Director of the Katiba Institute in Nairobi;
- Marwan Muasher, VP for studies at the Carnegie Endowment for International Peace
- Beverley McLachlin, former Chief Justice of Canada
- Alicia Bárcena Ibarra, Mexican biologist and Executive Secretary of the United Nations Economic Commission for Latin America and the Caribbean

== Building ==
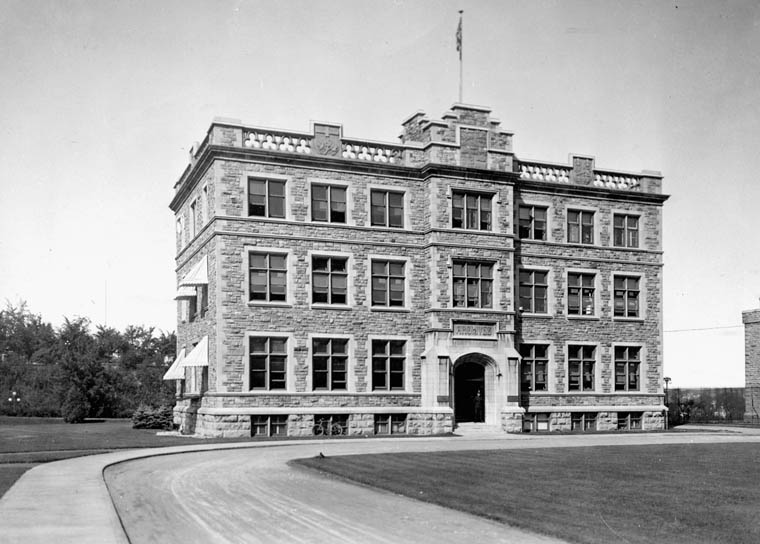
The building in 1923

Media related to Former Archives Building at Wikimedia Commons

The Global Centre for Pluralism is located at 330 Sussex Drive in Ottawa, a building that served as the home of the Public Archives of Canada from 1906 to 1967 and the Canadian War Museum from 1967 to 2005. The building was built from 1904 to 1906 and is designated a National Historic Site of Canada and a Classified Federal Heritage Building.

== Profile of activities ==
The Centre is a think-tank for studying and fostering pluralism.

The Centre honours people, for efforts to build an inclusive society, with the Global Pluralism Awards.

- 2017 Awards: Presented for the first time on November 15, 2017, with the winners being Leyner Palacios Asprilla of Colombia, Alice Wairimu Nderitu of Kenya, and Daniel Webb of Australia.
- 2019 Awards: Presented on November 20, 2019, with the winners being Deborah Ahenkorah of Ghana, the Center for Social Integrity of Myanmar, and 'Learning History That Is Not Yet History' of Bosnia and Herzegovina, Croatia, Montenegro and Serbia.
- 2021 Awards: Presented virtually on February 23, 2022, with the winners being Hand in Hand: Center for Jewish-Arab Education in Israel, Namati Kenya of Kenya, and Puja Kapai of Hong Kong.
- 2023 Awards: Presented on November 14, 2023, with the winners being Esther Omam from Cameroon; Red de Interpretes y Promotores Interculturales Asociacion Civil from Oaxaca, Mexico; and REFORM: The Palestinian Association for Empowerment and Local Development from Palestine.
- 2025 Awards: Presented on November 25, 2025, with the winners being A Land for All from Palestine/Israel; Colombia Diversa from Colombia, and the Southern Africa Litigation Centre.

The Centre has hosted the following Pluralism Lectures:

- 2012 – Former President of the Kyrgyz Republic Roza Otunbayeva
- 2013 – Former Secretary General of the United Nations Kofi Annan
- 2014 – Former UN High Commissioner for Refugees Antonio Guterres
- 2015 – Chief Justice of the Supreme Court of Canada Beverly McLachlin
- 2016 – Justice Albie Sachs
- 2018 – Author Karen Armstrong
- 2019 – Deputy Secretary General of the United Nations Amina J. Mohammed
- 2021 – Author Maaza Mengiste

== See also ==
- Delegation of the Ismaili Imamat
