= Zareef Minty =

South African Politician and prominent Lawyer

Zareef Minty (born 24 January 1994) is a South African lawyer, politician, businessman and television personality.

== Background ==
Zareef Minty was born in Vereeniging, Gauteng. He had his early education at Al-Huda Muslim School and his high school at St Conrads College. He then moved to Johannesburg to study his law degree at the University of the Witwatersrand where he completed a LLB.

Zareef Minty started his business career at the age of seventeen when he launched a clothing brand called Self Made Billionaires which was worn by South African model Lee-Ann Liebenberg and Kenny Kunene who also appeared on So What on ETV show second season promo launch wearing the label. He then went on to establish ZRF Holdings in 2016.

Zareef began his political career with African National Congress (ANC) where he was appointed African National Congress Youth League acting treasurer at the University of the Witwatersrand in 2012. In 2013 he joined the Patriotic Alliance (South Africa) party and he was appointed the National Youth President for the party in 2014 at the age of nineteen becoming the youngest politician to attain such a position for a registered political party in South African history. He then went on to participate in the 2014 National General Elections where he finished 5th on the party's parliamentary candidates list. Minty was named in the Mail & Guardian 200 Young South Africans of 2014.

In 2017 he wrote and published his first book called Empire, then in 2022 he launched his second book called The Secret To Finding Love which he co-authored with relationship coach Aseema Kazi. Zareef is a motivational speaker and he speaks at schools around South Africa.

In August 2022, Zareef was announced as one of the presenters for DSTV's Islamic television channel, INX Prime Live. He also launched World News Holdings with Norma Mngoma the same year.

Zareef Minty was appointed to sit on the board of Afribiz Invest in 2021 then in 2022 he was appointed as Chief Operations Officer for StartX, a United Arab Emirates technology company.

== Recognition ==
- Golden Key International Honour Society, honorary member
- Chairperson of the Black Lawyers Association
- University of the Witwatersrand Treasurer of the Law Students Council.
- One Young World Ambassador for South Africa
- SABC 1 One Day Leader Season 4.
- Forbes 30 under 30 class of 2018 (Business Category)
- GQ magazine Best Dressed 2015 and 2018
- Entrepreneur (magazine) 30 Top Influential South African Business Leaders
- Nomination by the French Chamber of Commerce for Best South African Entrepreneur (Generational Wealth Education)
