= Michelle Deshong =

Indigenous Australian equality activist

- Education: James Cook University
- Known for: Indigenous gender diversity

Michelle Deshong is an Aboriginal Australian political scientist and advocate for gender equality and Indigenous women. She has spent the majority of her career in shaping Indigenous affairs, including She has been CEO of the Australian Indigenous Governance Institute.

== Early life and education ==
Deshong is a Kuku Yalanji woman from Townsville, North Queensland, Australia. She grew up in Queensland in the 1970s and 1980s, and this experience drew her into the Indigenous rights field.

She moved from Townsville to Canberra after high school, and learnt about the inner workings of government while there.

After 15 years in the Australian public service as well as various roles in community work, Deshong returned to Queensland to start her academic career. She completed a BA with First Class Honours in Political Science and Indigenous Studies. She completed her BA while raising children as a single parent.

While working on her PhD for James Cook University in Cairns on the "Participation of Aboriginal women in public and political life", Deshong was awarded a Fulbright Indigenous Professional Scholarship, which she used to travel to the US and Canada, and included a residency at the Native Nations Institute in the Udall Center for Studies and Public Policy at the University of Arizona.

In 2017 Deshong was awarded the James Love Churchill Fellowship to "research and apply best practice on Indigenous governance and leadership models".

== Career ==
Deshong worked in Commonwealth public service, including as National Manager for the Indigenous Services at Centrelink, and as Senior Advisor in the Department of the Prime Minister and Cabinet, for around 20 years. She was also involved in the Aboriginal and Torres Strait Islander Commission (ATSIC).

She has also held roles in the non-government sector, including Queensland state manager for Aboriginal and Torres Strait Islander strategies for Australian Red Cross.

Deshong was executive director of the Australian Indigenous Leadership Centre between 2001 and 2010.

She founded her own business, Deshong Consulting, in 2008.

She was more recently CEO of the Australian Indigenous Governance Institute, an independent Indigenous-led not-for-profit organisation, but is no longer in that position.

== Other activities ==
Deshong is passionate about advocating for community and women's issues, and works to ensure the voices of indigenous women are represented at all levels. She has encouraged governments, businesses, and community organisations to provide ways for opportunities for First Nations women to get involved in leadership roles. She commented that a way to better support First Nations women can involve stepping aside to make way for impact, and said in 2015:

"I believe knowledge is power, and there's no point if I'm the only one gaining that knowledge... I've always tried to impart and share the knowledge that I'm gaining, particularly with Indigenous women, by engaging in conversations that empower women to be change makers."

She has worked for the UN Convention on the Elimination of All Forms of Discrimination Against Women (CEDAW). She has also and worked in various governance capacities community organisations, including as director of the Australian Indigenous Leadership Centre, QATSILS, Fair Agenda, and the Asia Pacific Indigenous Women's Network. She has contributed to the National Congress of Australia's First Peoples, the Coalition of Peaks, and the Uluru Statement from the Heart, and has been involved in the Justice Prevention Steering Committee, the Small Business Advisory Committee.

As of 2015 she was a lead facilitator of the Oxfam "Straight Talk Program", an organisation of over 900 Aboriginal and Torres Strait Islander women.

In 2019, Deshong gave a TEDx talk on "Black women: tipping the balance" at James Cook University.

In 2020 Deshong participated in Homeward Bound 5, part of the Homeward Bound project, a global leadership initiative launched in 2016 with the goal of creating a diverse global community. As part of this project, a female community of scientists travel to Antarctica, focussing on scientific endeavour and taking action for sustainability. The final trip is scheduled to occur in January 2025.

From 2021 to 2025 she was a board member of the Australian Institute of Aboriginal and Torres Strait Islander Studies (AIATSIS).

In 2023 she was a judge at the Supplier Diversity awards.

She is a director on the Reef Restoration Adaptation Board.

After serving as director on the board of Supply Nation for some time, she was appointed co-chair on 17 October 2022.

In May 2023 Deshong was a co-host and speaker at the Wiyi Yani U Thangani summit, together with June Oscar, Aboriginal and Torres Strait Islander Social Justice Commissioner. The summit was the result of a five-year project, started in 2018, of listening to women's voices, travelling to 50 locations in remote, regional and urban areas, listening to more than 2000 Indigenous women.

From 2 November 2023 until 1 November 2025 Deshong is a member of the Trade 2040 Taskforce.

== Recognition and awards ==
- Member of the Golden Key International Honour Society
- ?: University Medal, James Cook University
- ?: Deans List Award, James Cook University
- 2001 - ACT Aboriginal person of the year
- 2012 - Queensland Rural Woman of the Year: Runner Up
- 2013 - AFR/Westpac - 100 Women of Influence
- 2015 - Indigenous Professional Fulbright Scholarship
- 2015 - National NAIDOC Scholar of the Year
- 2016 - James Love Churchill Fellowship

== Personal life ==
Deshong has three children, whom she raised as a single parent for some time.
