= Leyner Palacios =

Afro-colombian activist

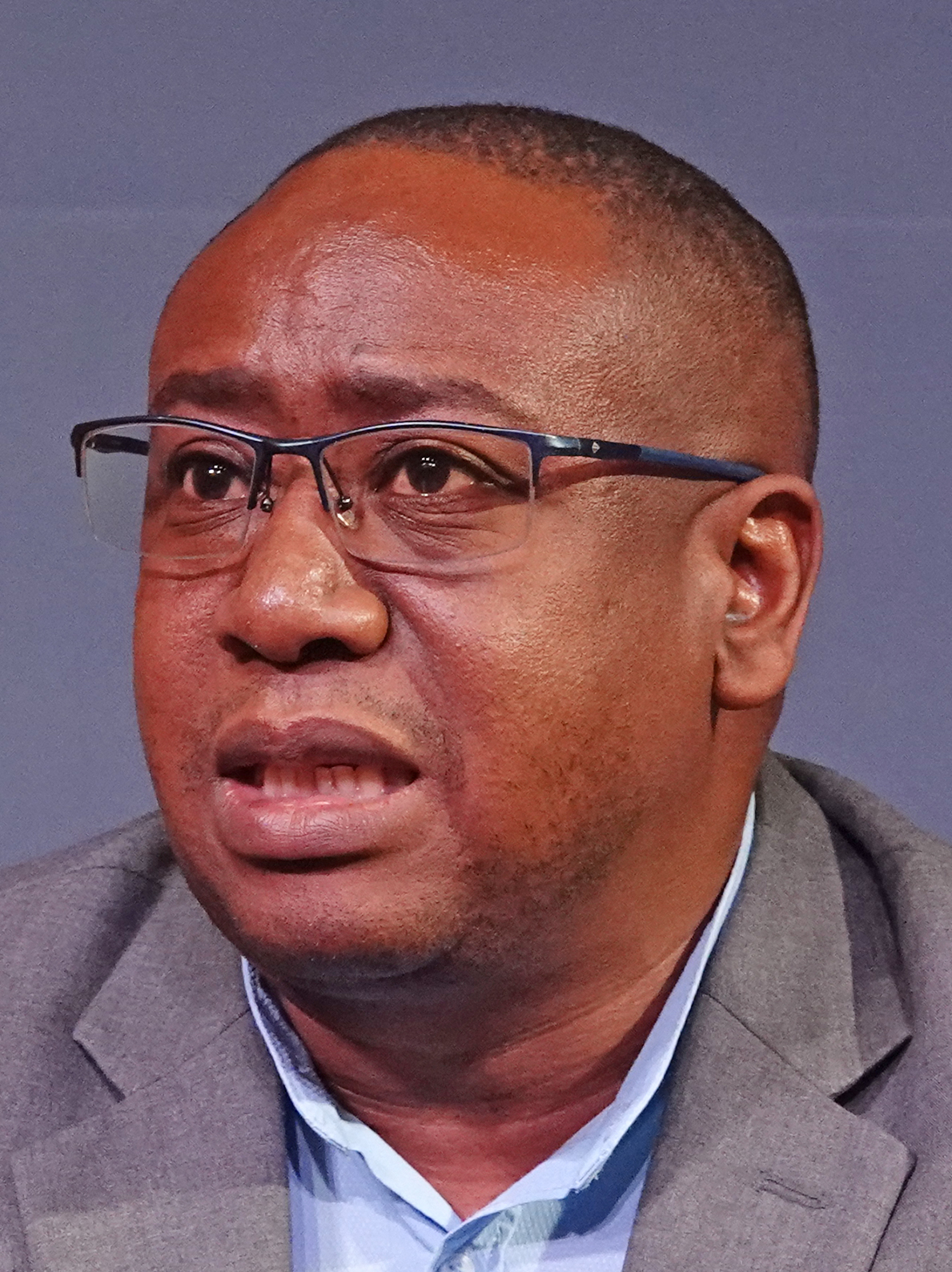
Leyner Palacios in 2024

Leyner Palacios Asprilla is an Afro-Colombian human rights activist and lawyer. A co-founder of the Committee for the Rights of Victims of Bojayá, he was nominated for the Nobel Peace Prize in 2016.

== Biography ==
Palacios Asprilla grew up in Pogue, a hamlet within the borders of the Bojayá region.

In 2014, he helped create the Committee for the Rights of Victims of Bojayá, which represents 11,000 victims of the Colombian conflict.

Apart from his nomination for the Nobel Peace Prize, Palacios Asprilla's other notable recognitions include the Global Pluralism Award and the Peace Summit Medal for Social Impact at the World Summit of Nobel Peace Laureates in 2017.
