= Marlene le Roux =

South African activist

- Born: 17 September 1967 (age 58); Wellington, Western Cape, South Africa
- Education: University of the Western Cape
- Employer(s): Women's Achievement Network for Disability, Artscape Theatre Centre

Marlene le Roux (born 17 September 1967) is a South African disability and women's rights activist. She is co-founder of the Women's Achievement Network for Disability, and CEO of the Artscape Theatre Centre in Cape Town.

== Biography ==
Marlene le Roux was born in Wellington, Western Cape, 17 September 1967. At three months old, le Roux contracted poliomyelitis which left her with a weakened leg for which she wears a brace. She matriculated at Bergrivier Secondary School then went on to earn a B.Mus. degree in 1988 and a Higher Diploma in Education in 1989 followed by a B.Ed. in 1991, all at the University of the Western Cape. In 2002 and 2003 le Roux continued her education with a Diploma in Management and a Diploma in Senior Management from Stellenbosch University.

Le Roux served as an international expert on the London Olympic Committee and Arts Council England to select arts projects for the London Olympics and Paralympics 2012.

Le Roux and Karen Smit launched the Women's Achievement Network for Disability, in August 2014, "to raise the profile and awareness of disabled women and girls in South Africa, so that their human rights may be advanced and promoted".

== Selected works ==
- le Roux, Marlene, ed. (2008). Look At Me. photography by Lucie Pavlovich. Cape Town: Genugtig! Publishers. ISBN 9780980260670. Featuring stories of 23 women with various disabilities, the photography is by Lucie Pavlovich.
- le Roux, Marlene; Ommundsen, Ludmila (2012). Mitchell's Plain : a place in the sun : the story of Mitchell's Plain as told by its people 1974-2011. Cape Town: Mikateko Media. ISBN 9780981416861. Everyday life in Mitchells Plain, a large township on the outskirts of Cape Town.
- le Cordeur, Michael; le Roux, Marlene (2013). Olivier, Ria (ed.). Die Wellingtonse klopse : 100 jaar se onvertelde stories. Tygervallei: Naledi. ISBN 9780987038821. About the minstrel history in the town of Wellington, Western Cape.

== Awards and honours ==
- Shoprite/Checkers Woman of the Year – Art Category, 1998
- Desmond Tutu Legendary Award, 2001
- Chevalier des Ordre des Arts et des Lettres, a French Knighthood in the Performing Arts, 2002
- Alumni of the Year 2003, University of Stellenbosch
- Western Cape Provincial Award, Arts & Culture, 2005
- Honorary Membership in the Golden Key International Honour Society at the University of Stellenbosch, 2007
- Alumnus of the Year 2007, for excellence in Management, University of Stellenbosch Business School, 2008
- CEO Magazine Awards. SA's most Influential Women in Business and Government. Recognition of achievement in the Arts & Culture Sector, 2010
- Ordre National Du Merite from the French Government, 2012
- German Africa Prize from the German Government for work done in disadvantaged communities, 2012
- Honorary doctorate in education from Cape Peninsula University of Technology, 2017
- Commonwealth Point of Light Award, 2018.
