= Christopher Mott =

American football player and academic

- Occupations: Senior Continuing Lecturer, UCLA

Christopher Mott is an American academic who was a National Football Foundation Hall of Fame Scholar-Athlete in 1978 and Pacific-10 Conference Medalist in 1979 for the Arizona State Sun Devils. He is currently a Senior Continuing Lecturer in the department of English at the University of California, Los Angeles.

== Background ==
Mott attended Arizona State University where he played for the Sun Devils football team, serving as co-captain in 1977. He received his B.A. in English Education from ASU in 1979 and his Ph.D. in English from the University of California, Los Angeles in 1991.

== Awards and honors ==
- Honorary member of the Golden Key International Honour Society, UCLA
- 1995:Distinguished Lecturer Award, UCLA
- 1979: Pacific-10 Conference Medalist, Arizona State Sun Devils
- 1978:National Football Foundation Hall of Fame Scholar-Athlete, Arizona State Sun Devils

== Selected publications and talks ==
- "Electronic Literature Pedagogy: A Questionable Approach." In Electronic Literature: New Horizons for the Literary: Supplemental Online Essays, N. Katherine Hayles, 2008.
- "The Art of Self-Promotion: Or, Which Self to Sell? The Proliferation and Disintegration of the Harlem Renaissance." In Dettmar, Kevin J. H. (ed. and introd.); Watt, Stephen (ed. and introd.). Marketing Modernisms: Self-Promotion, Canonization, Rereading. Ann Arbor, MI: U of Michigan, 1996: 253-74.
- "The Cummings Line on Race." Spring: The Journal of the E. E. Cummings Society, vol. 4, pp. 71–75, Fall 1995.
- "Libra and the Subject of History". Critique: Studies in Contemporary Fiction. 35 (3): 131–45. March 1994.

=== Book reviews ===
- "Hints and Guesses: William Gaddis's Fiction of Longing". Critique: Studies in Contemporary Fiction. September 1999. Archived from the original on February 24, 2006 – via FindArticles.
- "Blank Fictions: Consumerism, Culture and the Contemporary American Novel". Critique: Studies in Contemporary Fiction. September 1999. Archived from the original on February 24, 2006 – via FindArticles.
- "Don DeLillo". Critique: Studies in Contemporary Fiction. June 1994.

=== New Media talks ===
- "Customizing an Instructional Application." Scholarship in a New Media Environment: Issues and Trends. UCLA OID, 1999.
- "The Workload and the Web. Scholarship in a New Media Environment: Issues and Trends. UCLA OID, 1998.
