= Esther Omam =

Cameroonian human rights activist

Esther Omam Njomo
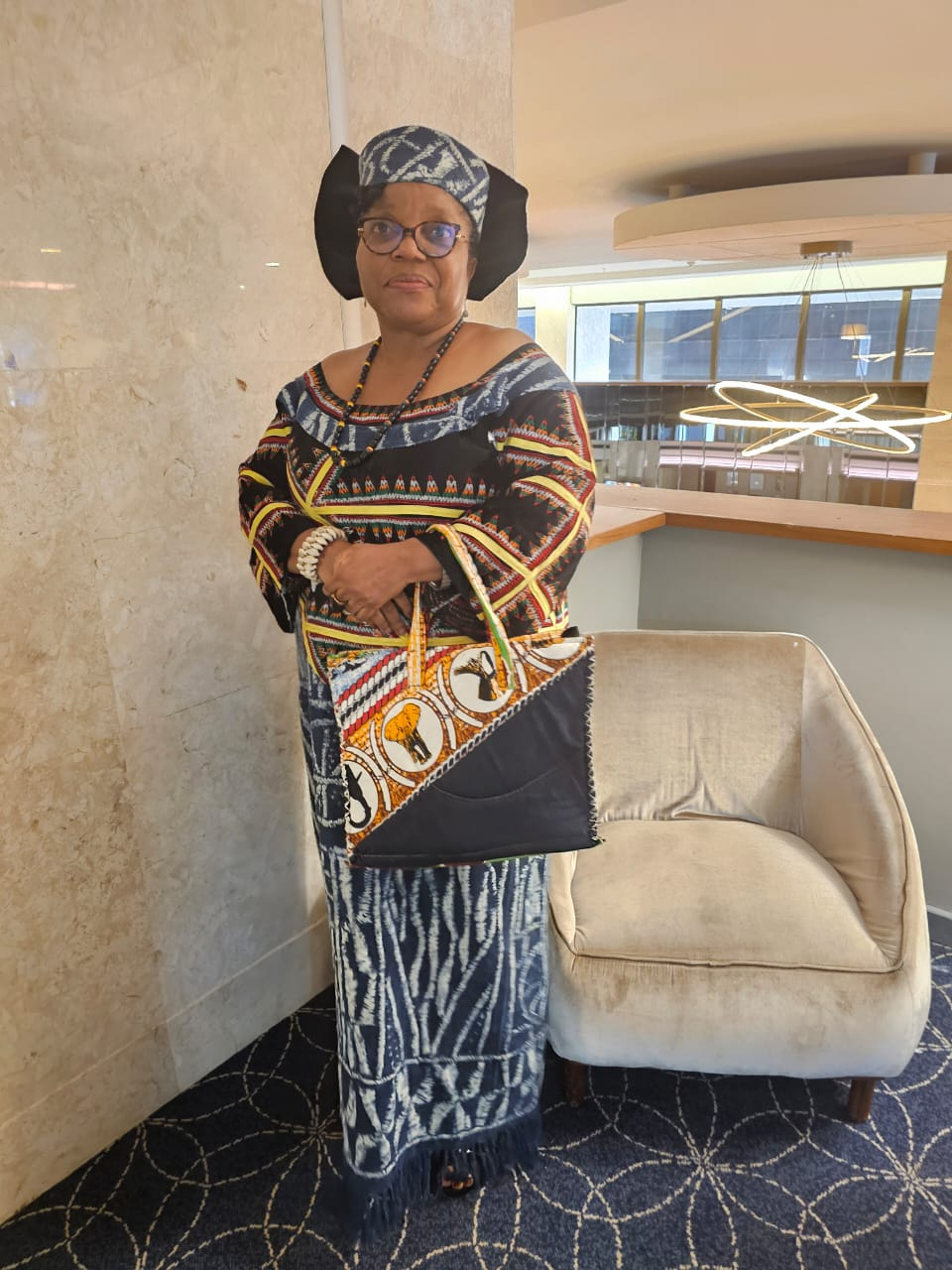
- Born: Douala
- Citizenship: Cameroon
- Awards: German Africa Prize; Global Centre for Pluralism Award

Esther Omam Njomo is a Cameroonian human rights activist and the executive director of Reach Out Cameroon, an NGO that promotes women's and children's rights in conflict-affected areas and ensures women's participation in the process of peacebuilding. She is the winner of the 2023 Global Centre for Pluralism Award, and the 2023 German Africa Prize.

== Early life ==
Born in Douala, Cameroon, Omam was forced out of school to get married at a young age.

== Career ==
Omam is a mediator of peace who belongs to the Women Mediators across the Commonwealth (MWC) network and became a member of the Women's Alliance for Security Leadership (WASL) in 2020.

In 1996, Omam created Reach Out Cameroon as a small initiative which was legally permitted in 2000, alongside a group of medical doctors, gender specialists, social workers, nurses, community relay agents and agronomists in response to HIV epidemic outbreak in Fako District, Cameroon.

In 2018, she proposed the creation of South West and North West Women's Task Force (SNWOT), bringing together women's civil society organizations from across the two regions of Cameroon and beyond.

In 2021, she played an important role in organizing the first ever National Women's Peace Convention in Cameroon, which brought over 1200 women together from across the country demanding an end to violence and calling for peace. She was a finalist for the 2021 Women Building Peace Award.

== Awards ==
In 2023, Omam was awarded the German Africa Prize alongside Marthe Wandou and Sally Mboumien, for organizing the first National Women's Convention for Peace in Cameroon.

In 2024, she won the Africa Women's Award in the Woman of Impact and Exception for the Promotion of Peace's Category for her contributions to ensuring peacebuilding in Cameroon and beyond.

- 2023 Global Pluralism Award
- 2020 Outstanding Humanitarian, Peace and Mediation award by Scoop Media
- Cameroon SHERO on COVID-19 prevention awarded to her by Women in Global Health Cameroon
