= Dekha Ibrahim Abdi =

Kenyan peace activist

- Born: 17 November 1964; Wajir, Kenya
- Died: 14 July 2011 (aged 46); Nairobi, Kenya
- Resting place: Nairobi, Kenya
- Occupation: Activist
- Children: 4 Children
- Awards: Right Livelihood Award (2007)

Dekha Ibrahim Abdi (Somali: Deeqa Ibraahim Cabdi, 17 November 1964 – 14 July 2011) was a Kenyan peace activist based in Mombasa, Kenya. She worked as a consultant to government and civil society organisations. She was of Somali ethnicity.

== Personal life ==
Dekha was born on 17 November 1964 in Wajir. She was married to Dr. Hassan Nurrow Abdirahman with whom she had four children. The couple divorced in 2007 and in 2009, she married Abdinoor, a Kenyan Somali ophthalmologist.

== Career ==
Dekha was a trustee of Coalition for Peace in Africa (COPA) and of NOMADIC, a pastoralist organisation based in Wajir. She was also a founding member of the Wajir Peace and Development Committee, the Coalition for Peace in Africa, ACTION (Action for Conflict Transformation), and the Peace and Regeneration Oasis (PRO).

Dekha worked as a consultant trainer on peacebuilding and pastoralists' development with many local and international agencies in various countries, including Cambodia, Jordan, Ethiopia, Somalia, South Africa, Netherlands, Israel, Palestine, Zimbabwe, the UK, Uganda and Kenya. She was also an Associate of Responding to Conflict and previously worked as RTC's Trainer and Learning Coordinator. Some of her mediation and peacebuilding insights can be read up in the book "Mediation and Governance in Fragile Contexts: Small Steps to Peace" that was published in 2019. Audio clips of interviews of 2010 and 2011 with Dekha can be found online.

== Awards ==
In 2007, Dekha was honoured with the Right Livelihood Award. The Jury commended her "for showing in diverse ethnic and cultural situations how religious and other differences can be reconciled, even after violent conflict, and knitted together through a cooperative process that leads to peace and development".

She was also honoured with Gernika´s Peace and Reconciliation Prize in 2008 (Basque Country) and Hessian Peace Prize of Germany in 2009.

== Death ==
On 7 July 2011, Dekha, her husband Abdinoor, and their driver were on their way to a peace conference in Garissa, when their car crashed into a truck. Her husband and driver died instantly. Dekha sustained heavy injuries and was airlifted to Nairobi. She died shortly afterwards at the Aga Khan Hospital at 11.45 am, 14 July 2011. She was 46 years old.

== See also ==
- Right Livelihood Award
- List of peace activists
