= Artscape Theatre Centre =

Performing arts centre in Cape Town, South Africa

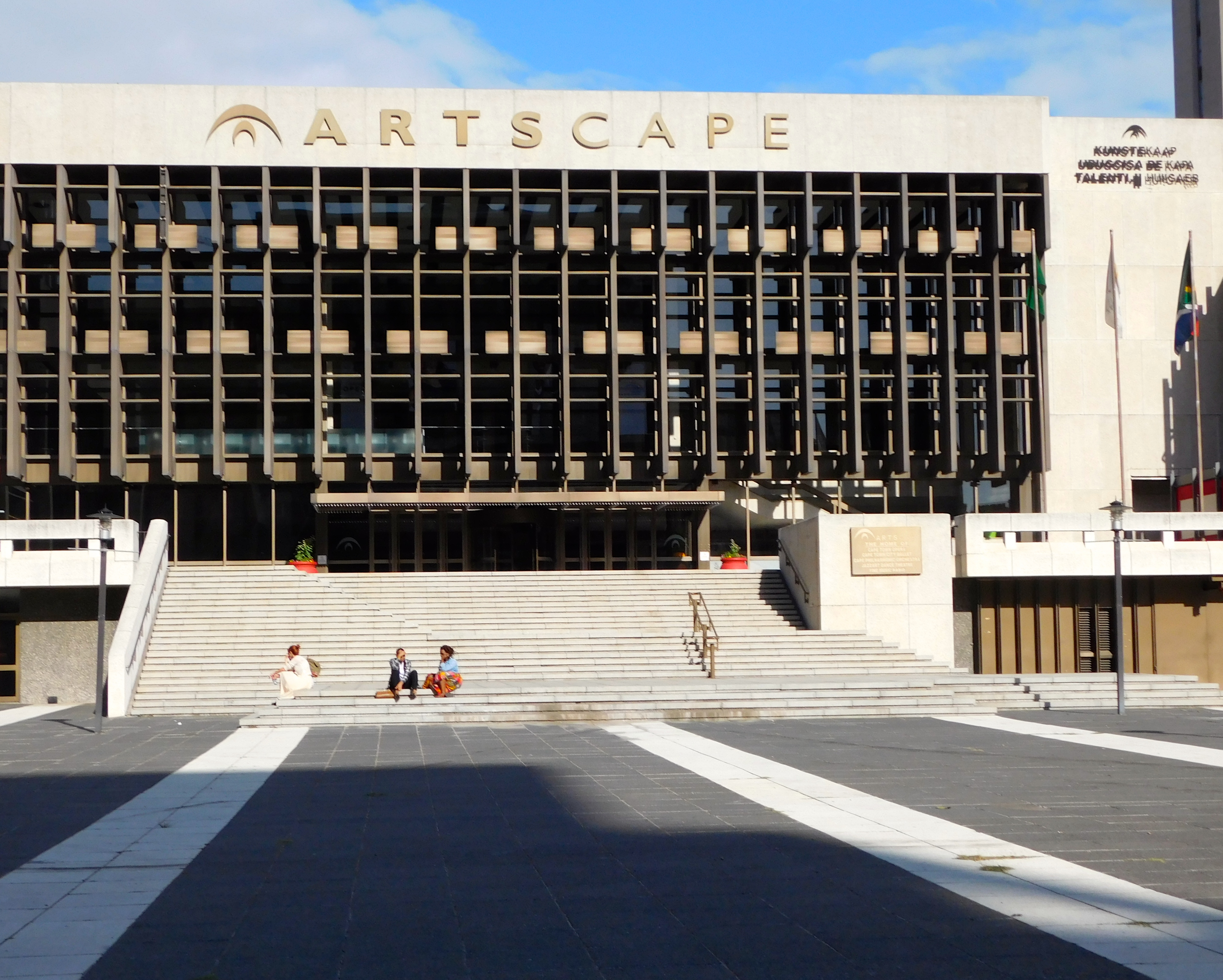

- Location within Cape Town
- Former names: Nico Malan Theatre Centre

General information
- Location: Cape Town, South Africa
- Coordinates: 33.9200°S 18.4305°E
- Completed: 1971; 55 years ago

Other information
- Seating capacity: 1,487 (opera house); 540 (small theatre); 139 (arena theatre)

Website
- artscape.co.za

Artscape Theatre Centre (formerly Nico Malan Theatre Centre) is the main performing arts centre in Cape Town, South Africa. It was opened in 1971 and is located on reclaimed land in the Foreshore area of Cape Town CBD.

The inaugural performance was scheduled to be Giuseppe Verdi's Aida but illness struck the title-role singer Emma Renzi and the production was replaced by CAPAB Ballet's Sylvia. Other productions in the opening season were Mozart's Die Zauberflöte in Afrikaans and Giacomo Puccini's Madama Butterfly. The complex includes:

- Opera House, seating 1,487 with provision for two wheelchairs.
- Theatre, seating 540 but more or less depending upon whether the pit is used.
- Arena Theatre, seating 140.

The Artscape Theatre Centre was originally commissioned by the Provincial Administration of the Cape Province and run by CAPAB (Cape Performing Arts Board). It was formerly known as the Nico Malan Theatre Complex, after the former National Party administrator of the Cape Province, Dr. Johannes Nicholas Malan (commonly known as Nico Malan), who initiated the project. The development and design was contracted to Murray and Roberts Construction now called Concor.

The centre was privatized and renamed in March 2001, when the Cape Performing Arts Board (CAPAB) was dissolved. As of 2018, the CEO is Marlene le Roux.

The Artscape Theatre Centre is also the home of Fine Music Radio and oversees the Maynardville Open-Air Theatre in Wynberg, Cape Town. It also houses the Cape Town Philharmonic Orchestra and the Cape Town Opera. The Cape Town City Ballet also performs there.

== See also ==
- List of concert halls
