= Muhammad Ashafa =

Nigerian imam

Muhammad Ashafa (born 1960) is a Nigerian imam. He is co-director, with Pastor James Wuye, of the Interfaith Mediation Center of the Muslim-Christian Dialogue in Kaduna, Kaduna State, Northern Nigeria.

== Early life and education ==
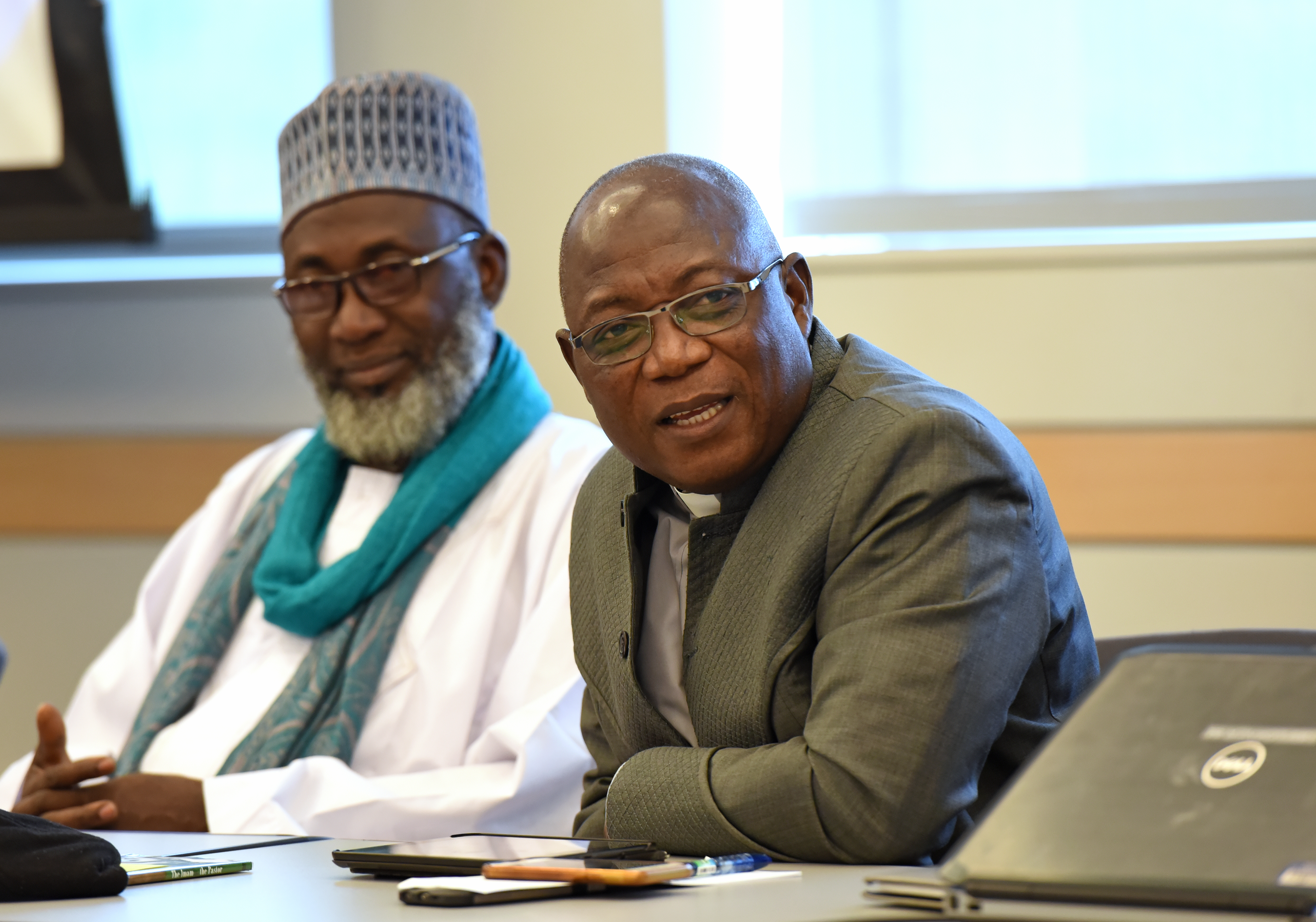
Imam Muhammad Ashafa (left), with Pastor James Wuye at the United States Institute of Peace, in Washington, D.C., 2018

Muhammad Ashafa was born in 1960. As the eldest son of a Muslim scholar and spiritual leader of the Tijaniyya Sufi order from a long line of imams, Ashafa grew up in a conservative environment, eventually following the family vocation and becoming an imam himself. However, unlike his elders, he belongs to a generation influenced by the 1979 Islamic Revolution of Iran, the Saudi Salafi preachers and the Egyptian Muslim Brotherhood, which brought him to join an Islamist group determined to islamize northern Nigeria and drive out non-Muslims. This movement reached its peak during the 80s and 90s.

== Career ==
Ashafa went on to become secretary general of the National Council of Muslim Youth Organizations, an organization promoting debate and confrontation against Christians. During a confrontation between Christians and Muslims in Zongon Kataf, Muhammad Ashafa lost two cousins and his spiritual mentor, while Secretary General of the Kaduna State chapter for the Youth Christian Association of Nigeria (YCAN) Pastor James Wuye lost his right arm. In 1995, the two former opponents decided to work together and build bridges between their respective communities and founded Interfaith Mediation Center of the Muslim-Christian Dialogue. The organization provides interfaith training to young people in schools and universities, to women, religious leaders and politicians. The center has thus contributed to defusing tensions in the 2002 and 2004 clashes in Kaduna and Yelwa.

== In film ==
Ashafa and Wuye have been the subject of two documentary films:

- The Imam and the Pastor (2006)
- An African Answer (2010)

== Recognition and awards ==
Wuye and Ashafa received the Bremen Peace Award in 2005, the Fondation Chirac Prize for Conflict Prevention in 2009, and the German Africa Prize in 2013.

They were among five recipients of the 2017 Intercultural Innovation Award, conferred by the United Nations Alliance of Civilizations and BMW, for their successful mediations in conflicts in Nigeria.

In 2025, Wuye and Ashafa were awarded the first Commonwealth Peace Prize, created by the Commonwealth Secretariat and the Khalili Foundation. The prize included a £50,000 donation from the foundation to the Interfaith Mediation Centre.

== See also ==
- List of peace activists
