= German Africa Prize =

The German Africa Prize or German Africa Award (German: Deutscher Afrika-Preis) has been awarded annually since 1993 by the German Africa Foundation (German: Deutsche Afrika Stiftung) to promote peace, democracy, social market economy and human rights. In addition to these primary goals, the German Africa Prize is intended to contribute to the understanding in Germany of Africa and increase awareness of Africa.

== Nominations and jury composition ==
The award is announced by means of an annual invitation for nominations, with the participation of German diplomatic missions as well as the foreign representatives of the sponsors. The award winners are decided by an independent jury, which, in addition to members of the German Africa Foundation, consists of representatives of the Federal Foreign Office, the Federal Ministry for Economic Cooperation and Development, the Association of German Chambers of Industry and Commerce, the German Council on Foreign Relations and the German Institute for International and Security Affairs. In addition, jury members may be nominated by the Kreditanstalt für Wiederaufbau, the German Africa Foundation and other German political foundations.

== Prize categories ==
The main prize honors outstanding persons from Africa, who have made their mark on peace, democracy, human rights and sustainable development. In addition, the German Africa Prize is awarded as:

- an honorary award for Germans who have earned respect in Africa
- an award for specifically Africa-related journalism
- a sponsorship award for African and non-African scientists, whose theses and dissertations are particularly suited to promote the development of science, culture, democracy or social market economy in Africa.

== Main award recipients ==
Since 1993, the German Africa Prize has been awarded to the following persons:

- 1993: Yawovi Agboyibo (Togo)
- 1994: Derek Keys and Trevor Manuel (South Africa)
- 1995: Peter A' Nyong'o (Kenya)
- 1995: Brazão Mzula (Mozambique)
- 1996: Elizabeth Kayissan Pognon (Benin)
- 1997: Alioune Blondin Béye (Mali)
- 1998: Sir Ketumile Quett Masire (Botswana)
- 1999: Waris Dirie (Somalia)
- 2001: Chenjerai Hove (Zimbabwe)
- 2002: Olara A. Otunnu (Uganda)
- 2003: Alpha Omar Konaré (Mali)
- 2004: John Githongo (Kenya)
- 2005: Paul Fokam (Cameroon)
- 2006: Segolame L. Ramotlhwa (Botswana)
- 2007: Francis Appiah (Ghana)
- 2008: Trevor Ncube (Zimbabwe)
- 2009: Christiana Torpe (Sierra Leone)
- 2010: Mohamed Ibn Chambas (Ghana)
- 2011: Abdikadir Hussein Mohamed (Kenya)
- 2012: Marlene le Roux and Pieter-Dirk Uys (South Africa)
- 2013: Muhammad Ashafa and James Wuye (Nigeria)
- 2014: Abdel Kader Haidara (Mali)
- 2015: Houcine Abassi (Tunisia)
- 2016: Thuli Madonsela (South Africa)
- 2017: Nicholas Opiyo (Uganda)
- 2018: Gerald Bigurube (Tanzania) and Clovis Razafimalala (Madagascar)
- 2019: Juliana Rotich (Kenya)
- 2020: Ilwad Elman (Somalia)
- 2021: Daniel Bekele (Ethiopia)
- 2022: Tulio de Oliveira (South Africa) and Sikhulile Moyo (Botswana)
- 2023: 1st National Women's Convention for Peace in Cameroon, accepted by Sally Mboumien, Esther Omam, and Marthe Wandou

== See also ==
- List of awards for contributions to society

== General sources ==
- "Archive about award recipients from 1993 to 2013". www.deutsche-afrika-stiftung.de (in German). Deutsche Afrika Stiftung.
