= James Wuye =

Nigerian pastor (born 1960)

James Wuye (born 1960) is a Nigerian pastor of the General Council of the Assemblies of God Nigeria and co-director, alongside Imam Muhammad Ashafa, of the Interfaith Mediation Center of the Muslim-Christian Dialogue in Kaduna. He is best known for his peace activism and efforts to defuse religious conflicts between Christian and Muslim communities in Nigeria.

== Biography ==
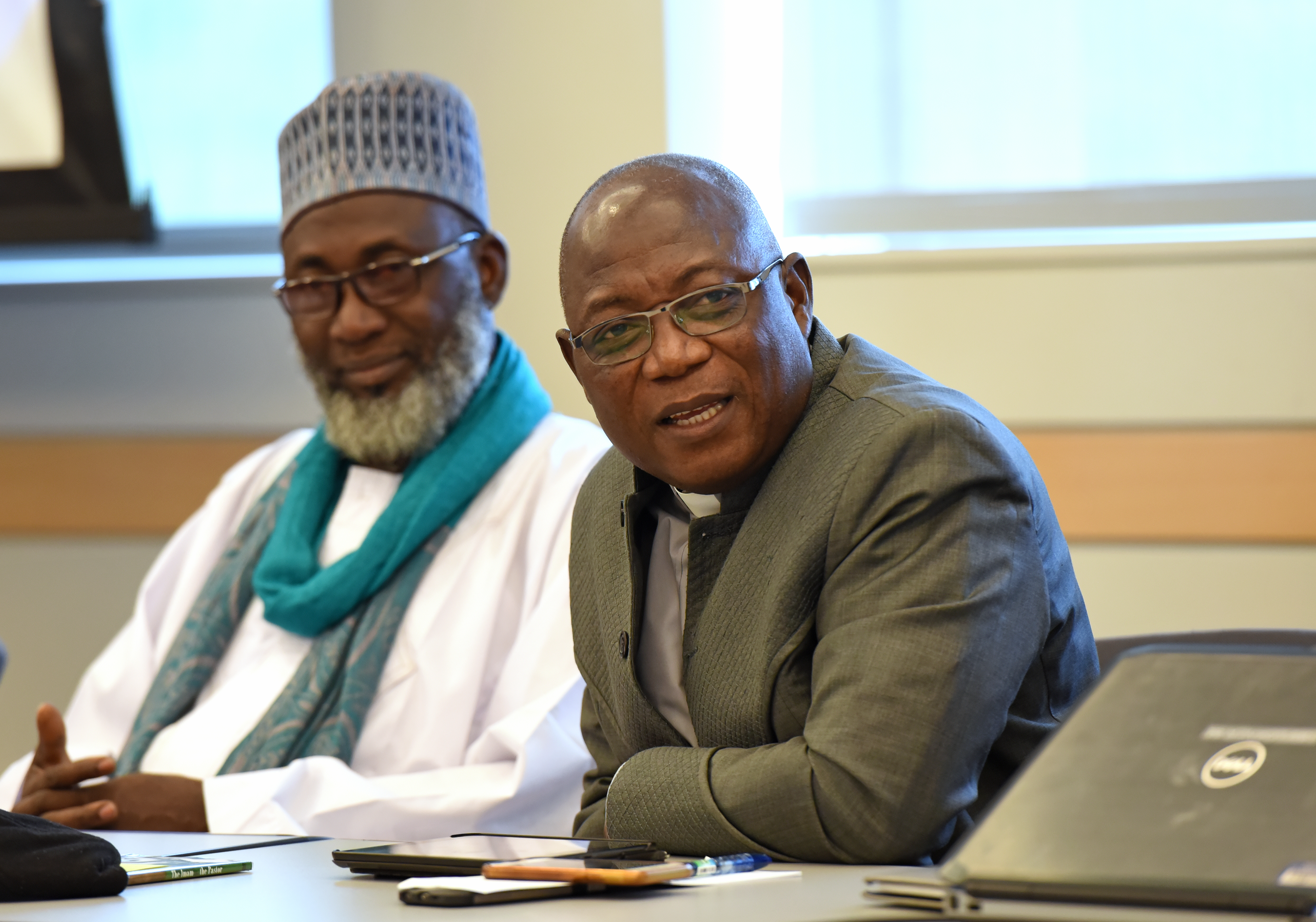
Pastor James Wuye (right), with Imam Muhammad Ashafa, at United States Institute of Peace, in Washington, D.C., 2018

James Wuye was born in Tudun Wada, a district of Kaduna. During his childhood, Wuye lived in military barracks after his father was conscripted to fight in the Biafra War. As an adolescent, he left the Baptist Church attended by his parents and joined the Assemblies of God Church. Wuye served in the leadership of the Kaduna State chapter of the Christian Association of Nigeria (CAN), an organization representing all Christian groups in the country. In 1987, he became a Hausa-English interpreter in a church of General Council of the Assemblies of God Nigeria in Kaduna. He obtained a degree in theology from the AG's Northern Theological Seminary in Kaduna. Then he went on to graduate with an undergraduate degree from Vision University, Kaduna campus and a master's degree in theology from West Africa Christian University.

During the 1980s and 1990s, Wuye participated in riots and interfaith violence. Wuye led a youth militia under CAN to fight for Christians. Conflict flared again in Kaduna State in 1992, starting in Zangon Kataf. During that conflict, Wuye directed the CAN youth militia to attack and kill Muslims, including targets from the youth Muslim militia led by Muhammad Ashafa. Over 2,000 people were killed; among the losses, Wuye lost his right hand to Ashafa's militia, while Ashafa lost two cousins and his spiritual mentor. As leaders on opposing sides in the violence, Wuye and Ashafa both desired and plotted to kill the other.

In 1995, the two former opponents were introduced by a mutual friend and slowly began to build bridges between their respective communities. They founded the Interfaith Mediation Center of the Muslim-Christian Dialogue in Kaduna. The organization provides interfaith training to young people in schools and universities, to women, religious leaders and politicians. The center contributed to defusing tensions and peace agreements between Muslim and Christian communities. The center worked with state governments to achieve peace declarations signed by community leaders declaration in Kaduna in 2002, and in Yelwa-Shendam after a spate of violence in 2004.

== Documentary Films ==
Imam Ashafa and Pastor Wuye have been the subject of two documentary films:

- The Imam and the Pastor (2006)
- An African Answer (2010)

== Honors ==
Pastor James Wuye and Imam Muhammad Ashafa received the Bremen Peace Award in 2005, the Fondation Chirac Prize for Conflict Prevention in 2009, and the German Africa Prize in 2013.

They were among five recipients of the 2017 Intercultural Innovation Award, conferred by the United Nations Alliance of Civilizations and BMW, for their successful mediations in conflicts in Nigeria.

In 2025, Wuye and Ashafa were awarded the first Commonwealth Peace Prize, created by the Commonwealth Secretariat and the Khalili Foundation. The prize included a £50,000 donation from the foundation to the Interfaith Mediation Centre.

== See also ==
- List of peace activists
