= Bremen Peace Award =

German award for peace initiatives

The Bremen Peace Award, also referred to as the Bremen International Peace Award or International Bremen Peace Award, is a biennial award given by the schwelle Foundation, located in Bremen, Germany.

== History ==
The schwelle Foundation was founded by a small group of people in 1979, now developed into a large peace foundation with international partnerships.

The International Bremen Peace Award was established by schwelle in 2003, to honour people who have contributed to peace in times and areas of conflict.

== The award ==
The Bremen International Peace Award, or Bremen Peace Award, is awarded every two years by the schwelle Foundation. It honours people and organisations who are exemplary in their efforts to promote "peace, justice, and integrity of creation". The nominees come from around the world, and award is given in two categories:

- Pioneering Peace Work Award
- Encouraging Initiatives Award

== Recipients ==
The inaugural Bremen Peace Award went to three recipients: Sister Weronika Sakowska, a Polish nun of the Catholic Order of Pallotines, who worked for close to 10 years in a camp for refugees of the Rwandan genocide, over the border in the DR Congo; Parents Circle, a union of Palestinian and Israeli parents who have lost their children to conflict; and the Bremen-born Hans Graf von Sponeck, who served for 30 years as a UN diplomat and resigned from the UN in protest against Security Council sanctions and in particular the US, being responsible for the death of several hundreds of thousands of Iraqi children. M

In 2026 there were two awards:

- Pioneering Peace Work Award: Mahdi Yahya who created the "Peace of Art" project in Lebanon
- Encouraging Initiatives Award: "Mate ni kani" organisation, which has headquarters in Bremen, Germany, and Niger, publishes children's and youth books for teaching mother-tongue languages, as well as supporting women's initiatives in developing their own economic prospects in Niger
