= Human rights in Botswana =

Human rights in Botswana are protected under the constitution. The 2022 Human Rights Report by the United States Department of State noted that in general the government of Botswana has respected the rights of its citizens.

== Constitution ==
The constitution of Botswana addresses human rights principles such as freedom of speech, Freedom of assembly and the right to life.

== Civil and political rights ==
=== Political freedom ===
Botswana has a dominant-party system in which the Botswana Democratic Party (BDP) won every parliamentary election since independence until 2024. Elections in Botswana are recognised as free and fair, and there are no legal restrictions against opposition parties, but the opposition alleges that the BDP has access to unfair electoral advantages while it is in power.

=== Speech and expression ===
The media landscape of Botswana is dominated by state media. Independent journalism is heavily regulated, and independent journalists have been arrested or harassed by the government on multiple occasions. Insulting the nation of Botswana, its associated symbols, or any public official is illegal and subject to a fine. Freedom of assembly is subject to government approval.

=== Due process and punishment ===
The Constitution of Botswana prohibits arbitrary detention, and detained individuals are entitled to legal representation. Most law enforcement comply with these requirements, but the Directorate of Intelligence and Security Services unlawfully detained political opponents in at least two instances in 2022. The government only provides free legal representation for capital crimes. Customary tribal courts do not offer the same legal protections as government courts, though they are popular with the public. The independence of the judiciary is generally upheld.

The Botswana Defence Force has been criticised for its aggressive actions against suspected poachers, including a shoot-to-kill order from 2013 to 2018.

Prison conditions in Botswana meet international standards, and prison officials are held responsible for inhumane conditions. The government of Botswana has been criticised by human rights groups for some of its criminal penalties, including capital punishment and corporal punishment.

=== Labour rights ===
The right to unionise is protected for all workers except for police, military, and prison workers, and union activity is protected for registered unions. Unregistered unions do not receive the same protections. Strike action is legally protected for all industries except aviation, health, electrical, water and sanitation, fire, and air traffic control services, though significant restrictions are applied and strikes are only allowed under limited circumstances.

The government guarantees a minimum wage for all workers. As of 2022, this is 7.22 pula ($0.56 USD) per hour. Work hours are limited to 48 hours per week before overtime pay is required.

== Discrimination ==
=== Indigenous people ===
Many of the indigenous San people have been forcibly relocated from their land onto reservations. To make them relocate, they were denied from accessing water from their land and faced arrest if they hunted, which was their primary source of food. Their lands lie in the middle of the world’s richest diamond field. Officially, the government denies that there is any link to mining and claims the relocation is to preserve the wildlife and ecosystem, even though the San people have lived sustainably on the land for millennia. On the reservations, they struggle to find employment and alcoholism is rampant.

On 24 August 2018 the UN Special Rapporteur on Minorities, Fernand de Varennes, issued a statement calling on Botswana "to step up efforts to recognise and protect the rights of minorities in relation to public services, land and resource use and the use of minority languages in education and other critical areas." He also expressed, “Many minority children living in remote areas of the country are torn from their families and forced to stay in boarding school hostels, sometimes hundreds of kilometres away from their communities; they may be taught in a language they do not yet speak, with over-burdened care-givers not familiar with their culture, and often lacking material and emotional support. This form of institutionalisation leads to forced assimilation that has a serious negative impact on the performance in school of many, if not most, of these children, and often forces them to drop out, at a heavy personal and social cost. Less intrusive and harmful approaches to providing education for these children, particularly those of a very young age, must be explored and put into force.” He continued, saying, “Since its independence in 1966, Botswana has not provided for the official recognition of its numerous tribes, with the exception of the Wayeyi and the Basubiya. In addition, it has maintained a three-tiered legislative and institutional framework that appears to award privileges to the eight constitutionally recognized Tswana tribes, both in terms of representation in the House of Chiefs as well as with regard to control of local administration structures.”

According to Varennes, however, “Botswana has made considerable progress in economic development and other areas including education and literacy, religious freedom, the fight against HIV/AIDS and corruption, but more must be done for minorities.”

=== LGBT rights ===
LGBT rights are a controversial subject in Botswana, and members of the LGBT community are often stigmatised. As with many countries in Africa, Botswana has a significant population that rejects the existence of homosexuality on the continent, considering it to be a Western phenomenon. LEGABIBO has been the primary LGBT rights organisation in Botswana since 1998.

Botswana's sodomy laws were unanimously overturned by the High Court of Botswana on 11 June 2019. Prior to this, it was a crime to engage in "carnal knowledge of any person against the order of nature" or "acts of gross indecency". In the same ruling, it was determined that sex-based legal protections also applied to sexual orientation. It was made illegal to fire an employee on the basis of sexual orientation in 2010. The High Court of Botswana ruled in 2017 that transgender people had a constitutional right to have their gender identity legally recognised.

=== Women's rights ===
The issue of women's rights was prominent in the 1980s and 1990s, often referred to as the time "when women started talking". Emang Basadi was the most prominent Botswanan women's rights organisation during this period, focusing at first on challenging laws that limited women's rights and later on political education for women. The Botswana Caucus for Women in Politics was formed by Emang Basadi in 1997 to take over these responsibilities, but it has not seen the same level of activity.

Attorney General of Botswana v. Unity Dow was a landmark case in Botswana women's rights, in which Unity Dow challenged the Botswanan nationality law that only allowed citizenship to be inherited paternally.

The Woman's Affairs Department is the government agency responsible for addressing women's issues. It has been criticised by women's activists for being ineffectual. As of 2010, Botswana and Swaziland were the only countries in southern Africa not to have a women's issues agency at the department level.

== Historical situation ==
The following chart shows Botswana's ratings since 1972 in the Freedom in the World reports, published annually by Freedom House. A rating of 1 is "free"; 7, "not free". (Note: Note that the "Year" signifies the "Year covered". Therefore the information for the year marked 2008 is from the report published in 2009, and so on.)

Historical ratings
Year	Political Rights	Civil Liberties	Status	President (Note: As of January 1.)
1972	3	4	Partly Free	Seretse Khama
1973	2	3	Free	Seretse Khama
1974	2	3	Free	Seretse Khama
1975	2	3	Free	Seretse Khama
1976	2	3	Free	Seretse Khama
1977	2	3	Free	Seretse Khama
1978	2	3	Free	Seretse Khama
1979	2	2	Free	Seretse Khama
1980	2	3	Free	Seretse Khama
1981	2	3	Free	Quett Masire
1982 (Note: The 1982 report covers the year 1981 and the first half of 1982, and the following 1984 report covers the second half of 1982 and the whole of 1983. In the interest of simplicity, these two aberrant "year and a half" reports have been split into three year-long reports through interpolation.)	2	3	Free	Quett Masire
1983	2	3	Free	Quett Masire
1984	2	3	Free	Quett Masire
1985	2	3	Free	Quett Masire
1986	2	3	Free	Quett Masire
1987	2	3	Free	Quett Masire
1988	2	3	Free	Quett Masire
1989	1	2	Free	Quett Masire
1990	1	2	Free	Quett Masire
1991	1	2	Free	Quett Masire
1992	1	2	Free	Quett Masire
1993	2	3	Free	Quett Masire
1994	2	3	Free	Quett Masire
1995	2	2	Free	Quett Masire
1996	2	2	Free	Quett Masire
1997	2	2	Free	Quett Masire
1998	2	2	Free	Quett Masire
1999	2	2	Free	Festus Mogae
2000	2	2	Free	Festus Mogae
2001	2	2	Free	Festus Mogae
2002	2	2	Free	Festus Mogae
2003	2	2	Free	Festus Mogae
2004	2	2	Free	Festus Mogae
2005	2	2	Free	Festus Mogae
2006	2	2	Free	Festus Mogae
2007	2	2	Free	Festus Mogae
2008	2	2	Free	Festus Mogae
2009	3	2	Free	Ian Khama
2010	3	2	Free	Ian Khama
2011	3	2	Free	Ian Khama
2012	3	2	Free	Ian Khama
2013	3	2	Free	Ian Khama
2014	3	2	Free	Ian Khama
2015	3	2	Free	Ian Khama
2016	3	2	Free	Ian Khama
2017	3	2	Free	Ian Khama
2018	3	2	Free	Ian Khama
2019	3	2	Free	Mokgweetsi Masisi
2020	3	2	Free	Mokgweetsi Masisi
2021	3	2	Free	Mokgweetsi Masisi
2022	3	2	Free	Mokgweetsi Masisi
2023	3	2	Free	Mokgweetsi Masisi

== International treaties ==
Botswana's stances on international human rights treaties are as follows:

International treaties
Treaty	Organization	Introduced	Signed	Ratified
Convention on the Prevention and Punishment of the Crime of Genocide	United Nations	1948	-	-
International Convention on the Elimination of All Forms of Racial Discrimination	United Nations	1966	-	1974
International Covenant on Economic, Social and Cultural Rights	United Nations	1966	-	-
International Covenant on Civil and Political Rights	United Nations	1966	2000	2000
First Optional Protocol to the International Covenant on Civil and Political Rights	United Nations	1966	-	-
Convention on the Non-Applicability of Statutory Limitations to War Crimes and Crimes Against Humanity	United Nations	1968	-	-
International Convention on the Suppression and Punishment of the Crime of Apartheid	United Nations	1973	-	-
Convention on the Elimination of All Forms of Discrimination against Women	United Nations	1979	-	1996
Convention against Torture and Other Cruel, Inhuman or Degrading Treatment or Punishment	United Nations	1984	2000	2000
Convention on the Rights of the Child	United Nations	1989	-	1995
Second Optional Protocol to the International Covenant on Civil and Political Rights, aiming at the abolition of the death penalty	United Nations	1989	-	-
International Convention on the Protection of the Rights of All Migrant Workers and Members of Their Families	United Nations	1990	-	-
Optional Protocol to the Convention on the Elimination of All Forms of Discrimination against Women	United Nations	1999	-	2007
Optional Protocol to the Convention on the Rights of the Child on the Involvement of Children in Armed Conflict	United Nations	2000	2003	2004
Optional Protocol to the Convention on the Rights of the Child on the Sale of Children, Child Prostitution and Child Pornography	United Nations	2000	-	2003
Convention on the Rights of Persons with Disabilities	United Nations	2006	-	-
Optional Protocol to the Convention on the Rights of Persons with Disabilities	United Nations	2006	-	-
International Convention for the Protection of All Persons from Enforced Disappearance	United Nations	2006	-	-
Optional Protocol to the International Covenant on Economic, Social and Cultural Rights	United Nations	2008	-	-
Optional Protocol to the Convention on the Rights of the Child on a Communications Procedure	United Nations	2011	-	-

== See also ==
- LGBT rights in Botswana
