= LGBTQ rights in Botswana =

- Botswana
- Legal status: Legal since 2019
- Gender identity: Transgender people are allowed to change legal gender without sex reassignment surgery or hormone therapy
- Military: Allowed to serve openly
- Discrimination protections: Constitutional protections for sexual orientation

Family rights
- Recognition of relationships: No
- Adoption: No

Lesbian, gay, bisexual, transgender, and queer (LGBTQ) people in Botswana have expanded in the 21st century, although LGBTQ people continue to face legal issues not experienced by non-LGBTQ citizens. Both female and male same-sex sexual acts have been legal in Botswana since 11 June 2019 after a unanimous ruling by the High Court of Botswana. Despite an appeal by the Attorney-General, the ruling was upheld by the Botswana Court of Appeal on 29 November 2021.

In recent years, the LGBTQ community has become more visible and accepted among Botswana's population. The Botswana High Court has been at the forefront of LGBTQ rights in the country. In 2016, it ordered the Government to register Botswana's main LGBTQ organisation, LEGABIBO, and in 2017 it ruled that transgender people have a constitutional right to change their legal gender. In 2019, it struck down colonial-era laws banning homosexuality, and ruled that "sex", as defined in Section 3 of the Botswana Constitution, should be "generously and purposively interpreted" to include sexual orientation. Employment discrimination on the basis of sexual orientation has been banned since 2010 in Botswana, making it one of the few African countries to have such protections for LGBTQ people.

LEGABIBO is the country's main LGBTQ advocacy group, and promotes awareness and acceptance of LGBTQ people.

== History ==
Homosexuality and same-sex relations have been documented among various modern-day Botswana groups. In the 18th century, the Khoikhoi people recognised the terms koetsire, which refers to a man who is sexually receptive to another man, and soregus, which refers to mutual masturbation, usually among friends. Anal intercourse and sexual relations between women also occurred, though more rarely. The San people similarly did not regard homosexuality negatively, and various rock paintings depicting anal intercourse between men exist to this day. The Tswana people, a Bantu ethnic group who make up the majority of Botswana's population, also have a local term to refer to homosexuality. The Tswana term matanyola, which literally translates to "anal sex", has long been used to refer to men who have sex with men. Prior to colonisation, Tswana society did not share the Western concepts of sexuality and gender. Many Tswana men would have sex with men, but also have wives. Homosexuality was not viewed as an antithesis to heterosexuality. Indeed, there was widespread liberty to engage in sexual activity with both men and women. Traditional dikgosi (local Tswana chiefs) argue that homosexuality has always existed in Tswana society, and that such individuals should be respected.

This relative openness and indifference towards homosexuality disappeared after Botswana (then known as the Bechuanaland Protectorate) became a British protectorate in the 19th century and began enforcing Victorian era laws and social policies.

== Legality of same-sex sexual acts ==
Same-sex sexual acts became legal on 11 June 2019. Previously, sodomy, whether heterosexual or homosexual, was criminalised, punishable by up to seven years' imprisonment. The law criminalising such sexual activity applied to both men and women. Initially, its application was limited to men only (similar to other colonies of the British Empire), however, a Botswana court found this to be discriminatory and that the law should apply to women as well. Although same-sex sexual acts remained illegal until June 2019, their prosecution was rare.

On March 30th 2016, the Gaborone City Council unanimously approved a motion calling for the repeal of Botswana's criminalisation of same-sex sexual acts.

Letsweletse Motshidiemang, a student at the University of Botswana, was the lead plaintiff in a case to legalise homosexuality in Botswana. In November 2017, LEGABIBO successfully applied to join the case as a friend of the court. The lawsuit sought to declare Section 164(a) and 167 of the Penal Code unconstitutional because "they interfere with his [the student's] fundamental right to liberty, freedom of privacy, as well as his right to use his body as he sees fit." However, the Deputy Attorney General argued that these sections were constitutional because they prohibited certain sexual acts which may be conducted by those of all sexual orientations, whether heterosexual or homosexual, and thus that these laws do not discriminate based on sexual orientation. Initially, the High Court was supposed to hear the case in March 2018. In February, however, the Deputy Attorney General asked for more time to respond to the plaintiffs' claims. As such, the High Court moved the hearing to 31 May 2018. The case was then postponed again. On 6 December 2018, the Court rescheduled the hearing for 14 March 2019. LGBTQ activists presented their arguments at the hearing and were given a date of 11 June for the judgement.

On 11 June, the High Court decriminalized same-sex sexual activity by unanimously declaring that section 164 of Botswana's Penal Code was unconstitutional. The judgement was welcomed by the ruling Botswana Democratic Party (BDP). Judge Michael Leburu further said that such laws "deserve a place in the museum or archives and not in the world".

"Human dignity is harmed when minority groups are marginalized." ... "Sexual orientation is not a fashion statement. It is an important attribute of one's personality".

— Judge Michael Leburu

In July 2019, the Government of Botswana appealed the High Court ruling to the Court of Appeal. Attorney-General Abraham Keetshabe argued that the court was mistaken in its conclusion in overturning the sodomy law, saying, "I am of the view that the High Court erred in arriving at this conclusion and thus, I have decided to note an appeal with the Court of Appeal", without giving further details of the grounds for the appeal. LEGABIBO and LGBTQ activists slammed the appeal calling it disappointing and an affirmation of persistent homophobia and transphobia. The appeal was unanimously rejected on 29 November 2021, with retiring Court of Appeal president Ian Kirby writing for the court that laws criminalizing same-sex relations "have outlived their usefulness, and serve only to incentivise law enforcement agents to become key-hole peepers and intruders into the private space of citizens".

In March 2026, the invalidated provisions were formally removed from the statute book through subsidiary legislation issued under the Revision of the Laws Act. A statutory instrument titled "Rectification of the Laws (Penal Code) Order, 2026", made by the Law Revision Commissioner, deleted paragraphs (a) and (c) of section 164 of the Penal Code. This was after years of legislative inaction after the courts had already declared the provisions unconstitutional, first by the High Court in 2019 and definitively by the Court of Appeal in 2021. Although the provisions had ceased to have legal effect upon being struck down, their deletion constituted a process of statute law revision, aligning the written law with the constitutional position established by the judiciary.

== Recognition of same-sex relationships ==
Same-sex couples have no legal recognition, whether in the form of marriage or civil unions.

== Discrimination protections ==
The Employment Act 1982 (Tswana: Molao wa Thapo 1982) has prohibited employment discrimination on the basis of sexual orientation since 2010.

In June 2019, the High Court of Botswana ruled that "sex", as defined in Section 3 of the Botswana Constitution, should be "generously and purposively interpreted" to include "sexual orientation". Carmel Rickard, legal columnist at the University of Cape Town, writing for the African Legal Information Institute, said, "The impact of this finding is significant and could well mean that the local LGBTI will have an even stronger, constitutionally-based argument for any further challenge to discrimination. It also has the effect that, thanks to judicial interpretation, Botswana's constitution now joins that of South Africa in outlawing discrimination based on sexual orientation."

"On the basis of the formulated rules of constitutional construction or interpretation, I have no qualms whatsoever in determining that the word 'sex' in Section 3 is wide enough to include and capture 'sexual orientation', as I hereby determine."

— Judge Michael Leburu

== Gender identity and expression ==
In September 2017, the Botswana High Court ruled that the refusal of the Registrar of National Registration to change a transgender man's gender marker was "unreasonable and violated his constitutional rights to dignity, privacy, freedom of expression, equal protection of the law, freedom from discrimination and freedom from inhumane and degrading treatment". LGBTQ activists celebrated the ruling, describing it as a great victory. At first, the Botswana Government announced it would appeal the ruling, but decided against it in December, supplying the trans man with a new identity document that reflects his gender identity.

A similar case, where activist and transgender woman Ricki Kgositau sought to change her gender marker to female, was heard in December 2017. The High Court ruled that the Government must recognise her gender identity. She dedicated her victory to "every single trans diverse person in Botswana".

== Living conditions ==
Homosexuality has typically been a taboo subject in Botswana, and has been historically seen as a "Western disease" and "un-African", though the early 21st century has seen major changes in the societal perceptions of LGBTQ people.

In February 2011, the Deputy Speaker of the Botswana National Assembly, Pono Moatlhodi, responded to a proposal to provide condoms to prison inmates engaging in same-sex sexual acts, as a measure to fight HIV/AIDS. Moatlhodi said that if he had the power, he would have those who practice homosexuality killed. Moatlhodi further said that inmates should learn that by having chosen to break the law, they were imprisoned and thus were responsible for starving themselves of sex.

In 2010 and 2011, former Botswana President Festus Mogae spoke out against sexual discrimination, saying prejudice was hindering efforts to fight HIV in a country where one in four adults had the disease. "We do not want to discriminate. Our HIV message applies to everybody. If we are fighting stigma associated with sex, let's apply it to sexual discrimination in general." He told the British Broadcasting Corporation (BBC) that during his 10 years in office, he had instructed police not to arrest or harass gay people. "I could not change the law because that would be unnecessarily stirring up a hornet's nest. I was not willing to lose an election on behalf of the gays. The majority of our people are still opposed [to homosexuality] so I must convince them first before changing the law unilaterally."

The U.S. Department of State's 2011 Human Rights Report found that "[t]he country has no law explicitly criminalizing consensual same-sex sexual activity. However, what the law describes as 'unnatural acts' are criminalized, and there is widespread belief this is directed toward gay, lesbian, bisexual, and transgender persons. Police did not target same-sex activity, and there were no reports of violence against persons based on their sexual orientation or gender identity during the year."

In September 2016, responding to the deportation of American anti-gay pastor Steven Anderson from Botswana, President Ian Khama said that "we don't want hate speech in this country. Let him do it in his own country."

In November 2018, President Mokgweetsi Masisi, speaking to a crowd, said:

There are also many people of same sex relationships in this country, who have been violated and have also suffered in silence for fear of being discriminated. Just like other citizens, they deserve to have their rights protected.

On 11 June 2019, the ruling Botswana Democratic Party (BDP) welcomed the judgement of the High Court that decriminalised homosexuality.

=== Civil society organizations ===
Botswana's primary LGBTQ rights organization is LEGABIBO. The Government has twice rejected its application to be registered; therefore, the group's ability to raise funds was limited. The registrar said that it could not register any group that "is likely to be used for any unlawful purpose or any purpose prejudicial to or incompatible with peace, welfare or good order in Botswana". In 2013, fourteen members of LeGaBiBo engaged Unity Dow to sue the Botswana Government to force it to register the organisation. The High Court ruled in November 2014 that LEGABIBO must be registered. The Government appealed the ruling and on 16 March 2016, the Botswana Court of Appeal unanimously ruled that the refusal to register LEGABIBO was unlawful. LEGABIBO has since managed to open its main office in Gaborone, followed by Drop In Centres (DIC) in Francistown, Kasane, Selebi Phikwe and Letlhakane.

== Public opinion ==
A 2016 Afrobarometer opinion poll found that 43% of respondents would welcome or would not be bothered by having 'a homosexual neighbour,' well above the average for the countries surveyed. A 2021 Afrobarometer opinion poll found that 50% of respondents from Botswana would welcome or would not be bothered by having a homosexual neighbour. Studies conducted by the Afrobarometer have found that young Batswana are more tolerant of gays than the older generation.

== Summary table ==
Same-sex sexual activity legal	Yes (Since 2019) (Note: The relevant invalidated Penal Code provisions were formally deleted in 2026.)
Equal age of consent (18)	Yes (Since 2019)
Anti-discrimination laws in employment only	Yes (Since 2010)
Anti-discrimination laws in the provision of goods and services	Yes (Since 2019)
Anti-discrimination laws in all other areas (Incl. indirect discrimination, hate speech)	Yes (Since 2019)
Same-sex marriages	No
Recognition of same-sex couples	No
Stepchild adoption by same-sex couples	No
Joint adoption by same-sex couples	No
LGBTQ allowed to serve openly in the military	Yes (Since 2010)
Right to change legal gender	Yes (Since 2017)
Access to IVF for lesbians	Yes
Commercial surrogacy for gay male couples	/Botswana currently does not have a law that regulates surrogacy for couples irrespective of sexual orientation.
MSMs allowed to donate blood	Yes

== See also ==
- Human rights in Botswana
- LGBTQ rights in Africa
- LGBTQ rights in the Commonwealth of Nations
