= Ditshwanelo =

Human rights organization

Ditshwanelo (Setswana for "Rights"), or the Botswana Centre for Human Rights, is a human rights organisation founded in 1993 in Botswana. It aims to improve human rights through education and governance. The group has campaigned against capital punishment and for LGBT rights. For its advocacy it has received awards from the Commission nationale consultative des droits de l'homme and OutRight Action International.

== Activities ==
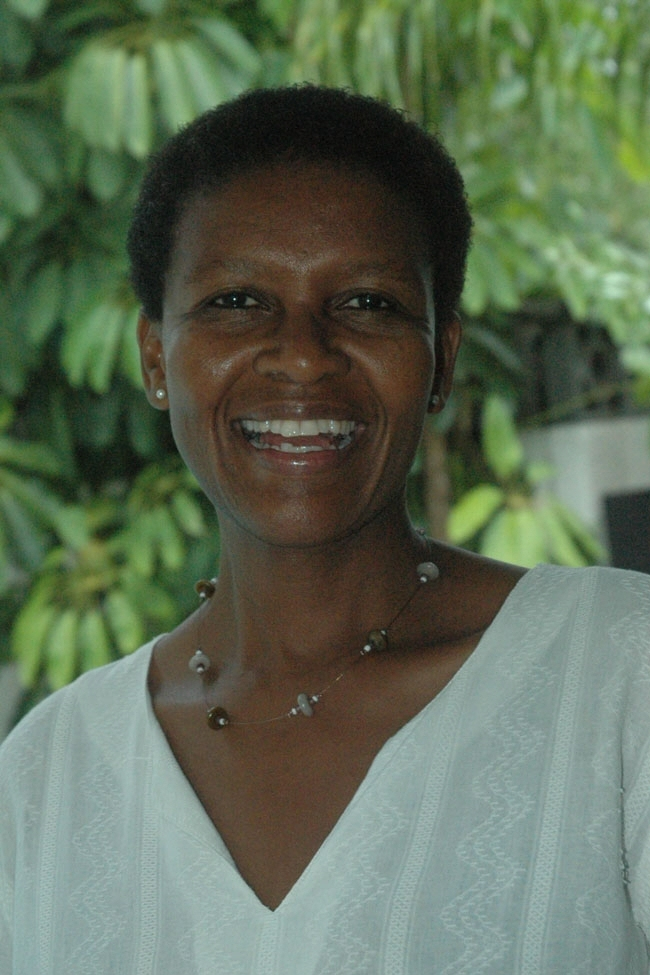
Alice Mogwe in 2010

Ditshwanelo was formed by Alice Mogwe in 1993 as the Botswana Centre for Human Rights. The group has campaigned on different human rights issues and focuses upon education and governance questions. In addition, it offers free advice for civil judicial matters, supports the San people in north Botswana and organises an annual human rights film festival in Gaborone. It has also campaigned against xenophobia, for example organising a one-day workshop in 2001 titled "Racism, Racial Discrimination, Xenophobia and Other Related Intolerances in Botswana".

Ditshwanelo has long called for the repeal of the death penalty, arguing that the Constitution of Botswana should respect the human dignity of all Botswanans, including criminals, and providing a report to FIDH, the International Federation for Human Rights in 1998. The following year, it prevented a miscarriage of justice by staying the execution of two San men, Gwara Brown Motswetla and Tlhabologang Phetolo Maauwe. They had been controversially convicted of murder in 1995 and were eventually freed by the Court of Appeal in 2006, eleven years later. The group reminded the Government of Botswana in 2018 that 42 African countries had stopped executions and that Botswana was now the only country in the Southern African Development Community to have it. Mmika Michael Mpe was executed in 2020 for his participation in the robbery and murder of Reinette Vorster in 2014. In response, Ditshwanelo commented "We once again reiterate that the loss of all life is always deeply regrettable. We further urge our Government to seriously explore other forms of punishment for capital offences".

Ditshwanelo has also focused on LGBT rights in Botswana. It campaigned for the legalisation of homosexuality in 1995 and organised a roundtable event in 1998. In 2003, it unsuccessfully opposed plans to criminalise lesbian sexual practices. LEGABIBO (Lesbians, Gays & Bisexuals of Botswana) formed as a network supported by Ditshwanelo and uses the Ditshwanelo offices. Ditshwanelo's patron is emeritus Archbishop of Central Africa Walter Khotso Makhulu. When critics questioned why the church was supporting a group promoting LGBT rights, Makhulu stated "Yes the Bible does say it is opposed [to homosexuality]. But it was written in its own day and in its own time".

== Awards ==
The International Gay and Lesbian Human Rights Commission (now OutRight Action International) presented its Felipa de Souza Award to Ditshwanelo in 2000, recognising its advocacy for same sex desire. The Commission nationale consultative des droits de l'homme awarded Ditshwanelo and then president Alice Mogwe a Human Rights Prize in 2012, celebrating its work in advocating for a people-centred development of the Central Kalahari Game Reserve.
