= Capital punishment in Botswana =

Capital punishment in Botswana is a legal penalty applicable for murder under aggravated circumstances. Executions are carried out by hanging. It is the only country in Southern Africa that still actively practices capital punishment.

There is on average one execution per year, and the execution usually takes place some years after the award of sentence by the trial court. In recent years, one execution has been carried out in 2016, two in 2018, one in 2019, and one in 2020. Another two executions were carried out on February 8, 2021. As of January 17, 2025, there are 17 people on death row in Botswana.

== History ==
During the existence of the Bechuanaland Protectorate, British colonial officials exerted control over domestic affairs in what is now Botswana. Under the Order in Council of 10 June 1891, the Resident Commissioner assumed permissive jurisdiction over death penalties imposed by African chiefs. The Resident Commissioner also presided over a collegial court responsible for adjudicating murder cases. In 1912, the Resident Commissioner lost his judiciary powers to an independent court which heard cases involving Europeans; from 1928, the court gained jurisdiction over treason charges brought against Africans.

Customary legal systems varied in their use of capital punishment; the Tswana people historically imposed the death penalty, while among other peoples the prescribed punishment was a heavy fine. Among the San people of the Kalahari desert, ostracism was viewed as a severe punishment.

The 1966 Constitution of Botswana guarantees an individual right to life. However, Article 7 of the Constitution, which prohibits cruel and unusual punishments, also prevents constitutional challenges to any form of punishment lawful at independence, including the death penalty but also less lethal punishments such as whipping. Novak suggests that, because Botswana was subject to relatively indirect rule by the British and achieved independence peacefully, its post-independence judiciary has been more likely to impose the death penalty than nearby countries like Zimbabwe, where hangings of colonial dissidents remain prominent memories. Clemency or commutation of sentences is uncommon.

== Notable cases ==
A controversial case was that of Mariette Bosch, a South African immigrant who was sentenced to death for murdering her lover's wife. She was sentenced in 1999 and executed two years later. She was the fourth woman to be executed since independence in 1966 and one of the few white women ever executed in Africa. She was hanged in secret, without her relatives being notified. In 2020, Mmika Michael Mpe was hanged for the 2014 murder of Reinette Vorster.

== Reception and future ==
The human rights organisation Ditshwanelo has campaigned against the death penalty. By 2018, over 40 African countries had stopped capital punishment and Botswana was now the only country practising it in the Southern African Development Community.

South Africa has refused to extradite fugitives to Botswana due to constitutional concerns over capital punishment. In the case of Benson Keganne, extradited to Botswana in 2007, a death sentence was imposed despite a previous guarantee from President Festus Mogae that he would commute any death sentence to life imprisonment. The sentence was ultimately reduced to imprisonment by the Botswana Court of Appeal.

An Afrobarometer survey conducted in July 2024 showed that the vast majority of Batswana support the retention of the death penalty with 82% in favour and 16% against.

Duma Boko, sworn in as President of Botswana in 2024, has publicly opposed capital punishment as an attorney representing capital defendants. In a 2009 panel discussion at the University of Botswana, Boko remarked that "If we didn't have the death penalty, Jesus would have lived much longer than the 33 years that he did."

== See also ==
- Botswana Prison Service
