= Mariette Bosch =

South African murderer

Mariëtte Sonjaleen Bosch
- Mariette Bosch
- Born: 1950; Union of South Africa
- Died: 31 March 2001 (aged 50); Central Maximum Prison, Gaborone, Botswana
- Cause of death: Execution by hanging
- Other name: Mariëtte Wolmarans
- Status: Executed
- Motive: Love triangle
- Conviction: Murder
- Penalty: Death

Details
- Victims: Maria Magdalene "Ria" Wolmarans
- Country: Botswana
- Date apprehended: 1996

Mariëtte Sonjaleen Bosch (1950 – 31 March 2001, later named Mariëtte Wolmarans) was a South African woman who was executed in Botswana on 31 March 2001. Bosch was convicted for the murder of Maria Magdalene "Ria" Wolmarans, both members of the white expatriate community in Gaborone, in June 1996. She was the first white person to be executed in Botswana, and was the fourth woman to be hanged since the country's independence. Due to these two factors, the murder case received significant attention outside the country and was referred to as "Botswana's White Mischief".

== Background ==
Mariette Bosch was the daughter of an affluent liquor store owner in South Africa, and with her husband Justin had moved to Gaborone, the capital of neighbouring Botswana, due to the latter country's lower crime rate and a bustling economy. The Boschs settled in Phakalane, a neighbourhood in Gaborone that was popular with affluent White South African expatriates and often referred to as "Little Sandton". Mariette became a member of the Gaborone Dutch Reformed Church and entered into high society, becoming friends with Ria Wolmarans and her husband, Marthinus "Tienie" Wolmarans. She had three children.

In 1995, Justin Bosch died in an automobile accident. Shortly afterwards, Mariette Bosch and Tienie Wolmarans began having an affair. The Wolmarans had separated in 1993 but had moved back in together the following year, despite Tienie promising Bosch that he would divorce his wife.

== Murder ==
In June 1996, Bosch travelled to Pietersburg, South Africa, and received her father's pistol from one of her friends. The following day she smuggled the gun into Botswana. Bosch entered the Wolmarans' residence, located two blocks away from her own, by climbing a security wall and shooting Ria Wolmarans twice, hitting her in the stomach and ribs. There were no witnesses to the crime.

Originally, police believed that the murder occurred in the process of a burglary and named no suspects. Bosch told her sister-in-law, Judith Bosch, that she loved Tienie Wolmarans and wished to marry him. Judith, with whom Bosch had an acrimonious relationship, persuaded Bosch to give the murder weapon to her and her husband, saying that she would give it back to the gun's original owner, who was a mutual friend; Mariette gave the gun to Judith's husband. Three months after the killing, Bosch ordered a wedding dress from a designer in Pretoria. Upon discovering the facts about the gun and the dress, Judith took the gun to the police. The police arrested Wolmarans on suspicion that he was involved in the murder, but he was released after one evening and was never charged.

== Legal process ==
Botswana prosecutors said that the murder encompassed "the four Ls of murder — love, loot, lust and loathing." After Mariette Bosch's arrest, Tienie Wolmarans married her in 1997 and supported her. Bosch was originally held in the Botswana Prison Service's Lobatse Prison.

Chris McGreal of The Guardian said, "The trial was at times bizarre". A psychologist serving the defence, Dr. Louise Olivier, had also worked as a magazine's "sex doctor." A psychiatrist, who served as the defence's expert witness, argued that Bosch did not have the profile of a killer and was not capable of lying. McGreal said that Bosch's daughter cried in court and that her family "were horrified at the circus atmosphere". On 13 December 1999, Justice Isaac Aboagye of the High Court of Botswana found Bosch guilty of Wolmarans' murder, and in February 2000, he sentenced her to death.

In January 2001, Bosch appealed. The British barrister Sir Desmond da Silva represented her. A panel of judges from the Commonwealth of Nations served as a court of appeal, and da Silva attempted to convince them that the Botswana government had not revealed, during the trial, that it had granted immunity to a suspect in exchange for testifying against Bosch. On 30 January 2001, the Court of Appeal of Botswana denied the appeal, ruling that Bosch's explanation of the case was not convincing.

At that stage, the only possibility of Bosch being saved from execution would have been a pardon from Botswana's President Festus Mogae. From 1966 until before Bosch's execution, 33 people had been executed in Botswana. On the weekend before Bosch's execution, Mogae said that he was not considering granting clemency.

While awaiting her death sentence, Bosch was imprisoned in the Gaborone Central Prison. The government of South Africa declined to intervene in her case. Up to the end, she insisted that she did not kill Ria Wolmarans, did not show remorse, and accused a third party of being the real culprit.

== Execution ==
In Botswana, the mandatory punishment for murder is death, unless extenuating circumstances warranting leniency are found. After Bosch had spent one year on death row, she was hanged at 5:30 am on 31 March 2001. The execution took place at the Central Maximum Prison in Gaborone. Bosch's family and lawyers were not given advance notice of her execution. The day after the hanging occurred, her family were driving to visit her when they learned about the hanging over the radio. Tienie Wolmarans said he had attempted a scheduled visit the previous day, Friday, to give Bosch some items, but was told that there was an inspection and so they were unable to conduct the visit. Bosch's death warrant was given that day. Wolmarans said that the prison authorities had lied to him.

The Botswana criminal justice system does not have a designated last meal for the executed. No sedatives are given to a prisoner before execution. Joe Orebotse, a man who spoke on behalf of the commissioner of the Botswana prison system, said that a religious minister, a medical officer, a hangman, and prison officials were present, but that no relatives were permitted access. In Botswana, relatives are not allowed at executions. Wolmarans said that he was not aware of the location of Bosch's grave on prison grounds. Her lawyers said that she had been executed with an unusual quickness and criticized the execution.

== Aftermath ==
On 2 April 2001 South African President Thabo Mbeki had been planning to launch a petition to get Bosch's death sentence overturned, not realizing that she had already been executed. Interights, a non-governmental organisation based in the United Kingdom, and some undisclosed parties had argued that the execution was unfair. On Monday 8 December 2003 Mogae's office said that the execution was not in contradiction of the African Commission on Human Rights and that the ACHR had ruled that Bosch's rights had not been violated by her being executed during the 34th Ordinary Session meeting that was held in The Gambia.

Human rights groups from South Africa and other countries criticized the execution; Amnesty International argued that it had been conducted hastily and in secrecy to avoid further controversy, that the family was not aware of the execution until it had already happened, and that the execution was rushed after the appeal failed and as Bosch was asking for clemency from Mogae. The Botswana human rights organisation Ditshwanelo also criticized the execution.

The case was compared with the book and film White Mischief, and the atmosphere of wealthy white people in the colonial-era Kenya that the series depicted. The book and film were based on a murder in Kenya in the World War II era involving a man, Sir Henry Delves Broughton, tried for killing another man who became romantically involved with his wife. Therefore, people referred to it as "Botswana's white mischief". A documentary about the Bosch murder case had been made. In 2001 the government of Botswana refused to broadcast it, saying that the documentary could result in litigation. After the decision, Chris Bishop, the head of the television news network of Botswana, resigned.

== See also ==
- Capital punishment in Botswana

== Additional sources ==
- Morrall, Peter. Murder and Society. John Wiley & Sons, 2 October 2006. ISBN 0470030224, 9780470030226.
- "In the Court of Appeal of Botswana Held at Lobatse Court of Appeal Criminal Appeal No. 37 of 1999 High Court Criminal Trial No. 34 of 1997 In the matter between MARRIETTE SONJALEEN BOSCH APPELLANT and The State Respondent" (Archive) – Appeals Court Ruling, hosted by the South African Legal Information Institute (SAFLI)
