= Human trafficking in Botswana =

Botswana ratified the 2000 UN TIP Protocol in August 2002.

In 2010 Botswana was a source and destination country for women and children subjected to trafficking in persons, specifically forced labor and commercial sexual exploitation. Parents in poor rural communities sometimes sent their children to work for wealthier families as domestics in cities or as herders at remote cattle posts, where some of these children were vulnerable to forced labor. Batswana girls were exploited in prostitution within the country, including in bars and by truck drivers along major highways; it did not appear, however, that organized pimping of children occurred. In the past, women reported being forced into commercial sexual exploitation at some safari lodges, but there were no similar reports during this reporting period. Residents in Botswana most susceptible to trafficking were illegal immigrants from Zimbabwe, unemployed men and women, those living in rural poverty, agricultural workers, and children orphaned by HIV/AIDS.

Some women from Zimbabwe who voluntarily, but illegally, migrated to Botswana to seek employment were subsequently subjected by their employers to involuntary domestic servitude. Botswana families which employed Zimbabwean women as domestic workers at times did so without proper work permits, did not pay adequate wages, and restricted or controlled the movement of their employees by holding their passports or threatening to have them deported back to Zimbabwe.

In 2010, the Government of Botswana did not fully comply with the minimum standards for the elimination of trafficking; however, it made significant efforts to do so. During the reporting period, the government began drafting a comprehensive anti-trafficking law, investigated potential cases of human trafficking, and provided protective services to several individuals who may have been targets of traffickers. It failed, however, to prosecute and convict trafficking offenders or make attempts to proactively identify trafficking victims among vulnerable populations, such as irregular migrants subject to deportation.

The U.S. State Department's Office to Monitor and Combat Trafficking in Persons placed the country in "Tier 2" in 2017. The country was on the Tier 2 Watch List in 2023.

In 2023, the Organised Crime Index gave the country a score of 4.5 out of 10 for human trafficking.

== Prosecution (2010) ==
The Government of Botswana did not increase its efforts to prosecute or punish trafficking offenses over the last year, though it investigated several suspected cases of human trafficking. The government did not prosecute any trafficking offenses or convict or punish any trafficking offenders in 2009.

Although it does not have a comprehensive law prohibiting trafficking in persons, provisions in the Penal Code of 1998, such as those in sections 155–158 on procurement for forced prostitution and sections 28000–262 on slavery, prohibit some forms of human trafficking. The sufficiently stringent penalties prescribed for offenses under these sections range from seven to 10 years’ imprisonment, and are commensurate with those prescribed for other serious crimes, such as rape. These sections have never been used to prosecute or convict a suspected trafficking offender. In June 2009, the Parliament passed a revised Children's Act, which defined a child as anyone under the age of 18 and increased protections for children from various forms of exploitation, including child labor and child prostitution.

Section 57 of the Act prohibits the facilitation or coercion of children into prostitution and prescribes sufficiently stringent penalties of two to five years’ imprisonment or a fine of $2858 to $7143. In October 2009, the Ministry of Defense, Justice and Security began drafting a comprehensive anti-trafficking law. Officers involved in law enforcement investigations of several non-trafficking crimes during 2009 observed that some of these crimes seemed to contain elements of human trafficking. Very few immigration and law enforcement officials are trained to effectively investigate cases of human trafficking or to differentiate between smuggling clients and trafficking victims, which continued to obscure the nature and extent of the trafficking situation in Botswana.

In 2009, the Botswana Police Service conducted 10 in-service training courses for its officers, during which students received lectures on combating human trafficking. A police officer in the National Central Bureau of Interpol was assigned to work exclusively on human trafficking issues and to educate police officers about the phenomenon; information on his specific anti-trafficking duties and the results of his work were unavailable.

== Protection (2010) ==
The government showed evidence of minimal efforts to protect victims of trafficking. During the year, the government did not identify or provide assistance to any confirmed victims of trafficking, but provided shelter and social services to three Zimbabwean children and six illegal Indian migrants who officials believed to be targets of transnational traffickers.

The government provided logistical and financial assistance to repatriate all nine individuals to their countries of origin. NGO-operated shelters which received government funding to provide services to children, including children in prostitution, may have provided assistance to trafficked children without identifying them as such. Law enforcement and social services personnel have not established formal procedures to proactively identify victims of trafficking among vulnerable populations or to refer identified victims for protective services, and foreign trafficking victims have been deported from Botswana.

During the reporting period, IO M identified 594 unaccompanied minors at the reception center in Plumtree for Zimbabweans deported from Botswana and expressed concern that some of them may have been victims of trafficking Botswana has an extensive public medical system, which includes psychological care facilities, and a university-run legal clinic which provides legal assistance to victims of any crime. It is unclear whether any trafficking victims received assistance at these facilities in 2009. Botswana's laws do not specifically protect victims of trafficking from penalization for unlawful acts committed as a direct result of being trafficked, but the government did not generally prosecute persons it believed to be victims of any crime.

== Prevention (2010) ==
The government made moderate efforts to prevent trafficking in and through Botswana. During the reporting period, the government did not complete or implement a national anti-trafficking plan of action it began developing in 2008. The government continued its participation with NGOs in an anti-trafficking working group. During the reporting period, the working group raised the issue of trafficking in the local press and within the government; fostered communication on trafficking issues between the government, NGOs, and other stakeholders; and laid the groundwork for drafting and implementing anti-TI P legislation.

It produced and disseminated anti-trafficking education posters at all of its border posts and included trafficking awareness segments in some of its law enforcement training sessions. In early 2009, a partnership of NGOs and representatives from the government's police, labor, and social services responsible for issues of child labor, including the trafficking of children for forced labor, formed a child labor task force that met regularly throughout the reporting period.

In mid-2009, the government funded the salaries of two ILO consultants to advise the government on how to strengthen both its laws on worst forms of child labor and enforcement of those laws. The task force began developing definitions for what constitutes "hazardous work" under child labor statutes and recommended changes within existing laws to standardize the definition of a "child" under different statutes. During the year, the Ministry of Labor conducted child labor inspections and removed at least one child from a situation of exploitative child labor. The government made efforts to reduce the demand for commercial sex acts, largely through a broad, well-publicized HIV /AIDS awareness campaign that discouraged commercial sex acts.

== See also ==
- Human rights in Botswana
