= Alice Mogwe =

Botswanan activist and lawyer (born 1961)

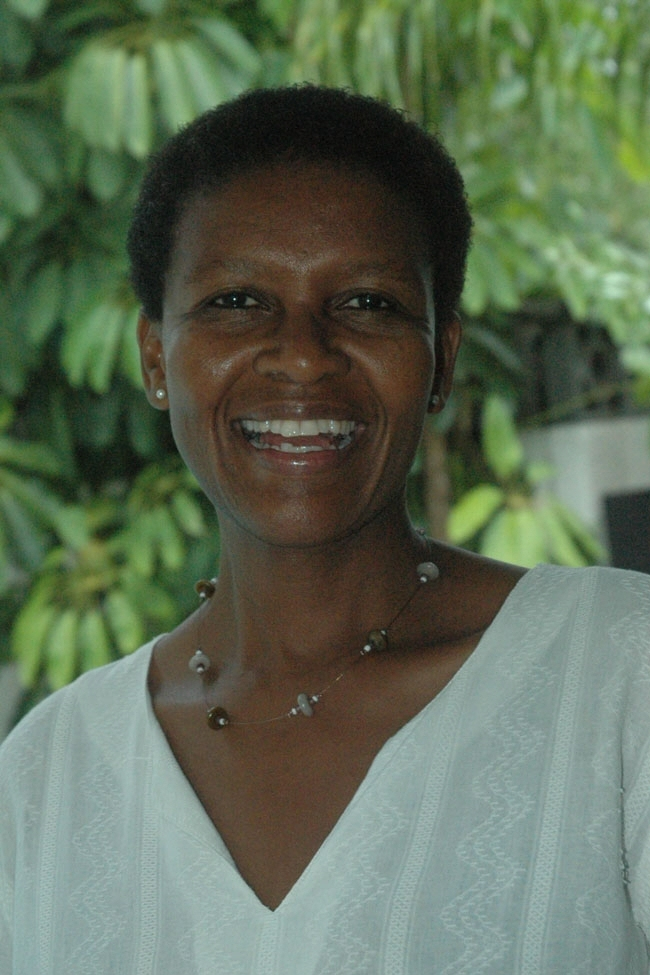
- Mogwe in 2010
- Born: 14 February 1961 (age 65); Molepolole, Botswana
- Occupations: President of the International Federation for Human Rights; Director of Ditshwanelo

Alice Bahumi Mogwe (born 14 February 1961) is a Motswana activist and lawyer. She is the founder and director of the human rights organization Ditshwanelo.

In 2019, she was elected to a three-year term as president of the International Federation for Human Rights, and she was reelected in 2022.

Mogwe's work focuses on protecting political freedoms, abolishing the death penalty, and ensuring rights for minorities, women, children, LGBTQ people, domestic workers, and refugees and other migrants.

== Early life and education ==
Alice Mogwe was born in 1961 in Molepolole, Botswana. She began university in South Africa during apartheid at the University of Cape Town. After graduating with a bachelor of arts degree in 1982 and then a bachelor of laws in 1985, she moved to England to obtain a master of laws from the University of Kent in 1990.

== Career ==
After returning to Botswana, Mogwe began her career as a human rights lawyer, becoming a founding member of the organization Women and Law in Southern Africa.

In 1993, she established the human rights organization Ditshwanelo, which she has continued to direct. The organization, also known as the Botswana Centre for Human Rights, provides legal aid and otherwise advocates for human rights causes.

Her human rights work with Ditshwanelo included supporting the rights of indigenous groups in Botswana such as the Basarwa. She is also known for having organized legal fights against death penalty cases and against the deportation of refugees.

Mogwe founded and worked with various other civil society organizations in Botswana, including the Domestic Workers’ Foundation and the Botswana Labor Migrants Association. She has also worked as an election observer in Botswana and as co-chair of Tanzania Elections Watch.

A practicing Anglican, she is a member of the Anglican Peace and Justice Network. Early in her career, she served as a delegate for the World Council of Churches.

In 2019, Mogwe was elected president of the International Federation for Human Rights (FIDH), a major nongovernmental human rights federation and watchdog group. She was the first woman from Sub-Saharan Africa to lead the organization. After her first three-year term, she was reelected in 2022. She had previously served as deputy secretary-general, then secretary-general of the organization. Mogwe has also served two terms on the board of International Service for Human Rights.

== Awards and recognition ==
- FES Human Rights Award 2021
- Human Rights Prize of the Commission Nationale Consultative des Droits de l’Homme (CNCDH) (2012)
- David Rockefeller Bridging Leadership Award (2010)
- Recognition of Contribution as a Vanguard Women's Leader of Botswana (2005)
- Chevalier de l’Ordre National du Merite awarded by the Government of the Republic of France (2005)
- Chevalier, French Legion of Honour (2024)

== Publications ==
- Mogwe, A. (1994). Human Rights in Botswana: Feminism, Oppression, and “Integration”. Alternatives, 19(2), 189-193.
- Mogwe, A. L. I. C. E., & Melville, I. N. G. R. I. D. (2012). Human dignity and democracy. A Fine Balance: Assessing the Quality of Governance in Botswana, 83-99.
- Mogwe, A. (1992). Botswana: Abortion ‘debate’dynamics. Agenda, 8(12), 41-43.
