= Botswana passport =

Passport issued to citizens of Botswana

- The front cover of Botswanan biometric passport
- Type: Passport
- Issued by: Botswana
- Purpose: Identification
- Eligibility: Batswana citizenship
- Expiration: 10 Years
- Cost: $25

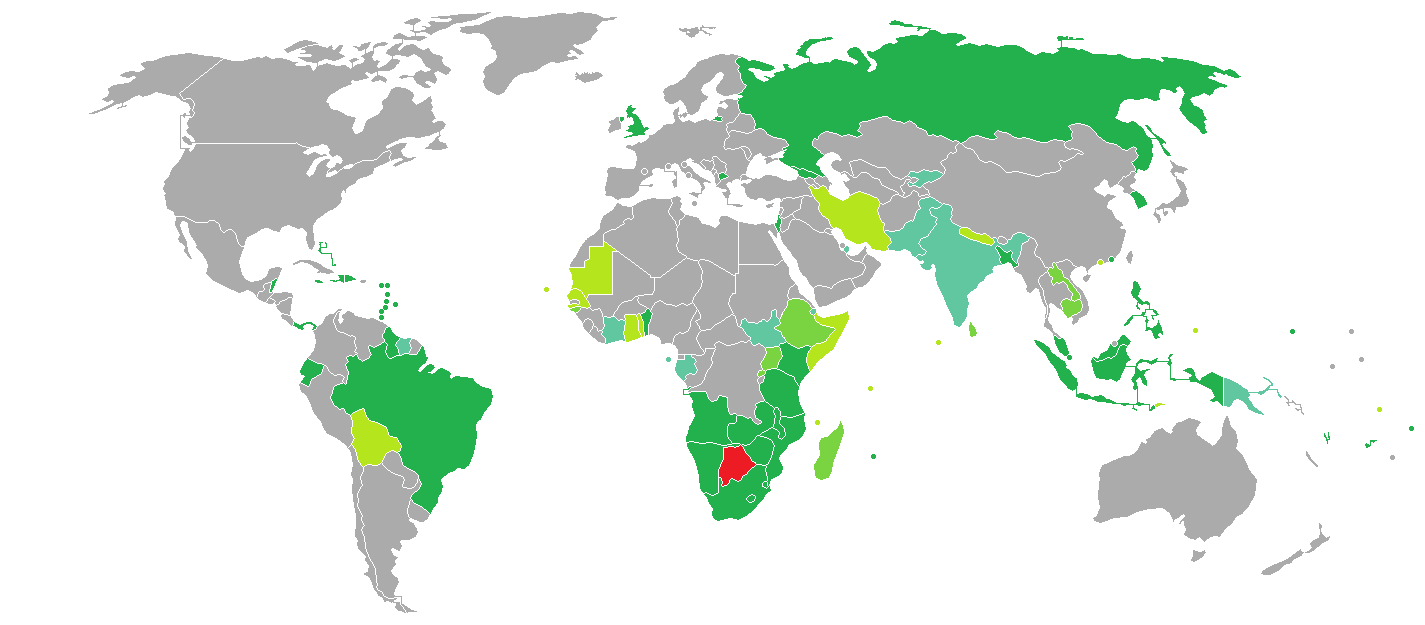
visa-free & visa-on-arrival countries for holders of the Botswana passport

Botswana passports are travel documents issued by the Passport Division of the Department of Immigration and Citizenship in the Ministry of Nationality, Immigration And Gender Affairs to citizens of Botswana for international travel.

On 8 March 2010, the Department of Immigration and Citizenship began issuing electronic passports to the general public. The validity of all Botswana non-electronic passports expired on 31 December 2011.

The Botswana passport, which features 48 pages, is written in English and French. The firsts page features a map of Botswana superimposed with wildlife.

As of 2014 the Botswana passport was the 4th most powerful on the African continent, allowing Botswana citizens travel to at least 70 countries visa free, 28 with visa on arrival and 121 requiring a visa. The passport is ranked 58th in the world.

== See also ==
- Visa requirements for Botswana citizens
- List of passports
