= Botswana nationality law =

Citizenship Act, 1998

Parliament of Botswana
- Long title: An Act to re-enact with amendments the provisions relating to the acquisition and loss of citizenship of Botswana and for matters related thereto.
- Citation: Act No. 8 of 1998; Cap. 01:01
- Territorial extent: Botswana
- Passed by: National Assembly of Botswana
- Passed: 8 April 1998
- Assented to: 20 April 1998
- Commenced: 24 April 1998
- Administered by: Ministry of Labour and Home Affairs

Legislative history
- Bill title: Citizenship Bill, 1998
- Bill citation: Bill No. 9 of 1998

Repeals
- Citizenship Act, 1982 (Act No. 25 of 1982)

Amended by
- Citizenship (Amendment) Act, 2001 (Act No. 9 of 2002); Citizenship (Amendment) Act, 2003 (Act No. 1 of 2004); Citizenship (Amendment) Act, 2021 (Act No. 10 of 2021); Citizenship (Amendment) Act, 2024 (Act No. 23 of 2024); Citizenship (Amendment) Act, 2026 (Act No. 4 of 2026)

Related cases
- Attorney-General v Dow (1992); John K. Modise v Botswana (2000); Mathe and Others v Attorney General (2022)

Text of statute as originally enacted
- Status: Amended

The primary law governing nationality of Botswana is the Citizenship Act, 1998, which came into force on 24 April 1998.

Botswana citizenship is principally acquired through jus sanguinis, or descent from a citizen parent, rather than birth on Botswana territory alone. It may also be acquired through adoption, registration, naturalisation and particular statutory arrangements for people who would otherwise lack a nationality.

== Terminology ==
The distinction between the terms citizenship and nationality is not always clear in the English language and varies between jurisdictions. Generally, nationality refers to the legal relationship between an individual and a sovereign state, particularly in international law, while citizenship refers to membership of a state under domestic law and the associated rights and duties. The distinction is more clearly defined in some non-English-speaking jurisdictions than in the Anglosphere. In Botswana, the terms generally denote the same legal status, although domestic legislation principally uses citizenship. In Attorney-General v Dow (1992), Amissah P of the Court of Appeal distinguished nationality in the legal sense of citizenship from nationality understood as ethnic identity.

== History ==
=== Pre-independence context ===
Before British intervention, the territory now forming Botswana comprised several Tswana polities, including the Ngwaketse, Kwena, Ngwato and Tawana states, together with other communities. Britain established the Bechuanaland Protectorate in 1885. The distinction between membership of these societies and the nationality categories created by British imperial law is important to the later emergence of Botswana citizenship.

The legal status of inhabitants of a British protectorate differed from that of residents of a Crown colony. Indigenous people of the Bechuanaland Protectorate were generally classed as British protected persons, not automatically as British subjects or Citizens of the United Kingdom and Colonies (CUKC). Some people residing in the territory nonetheless possessed British nationality through other legal connections.

=== Independence ===
On 30 September 1966, Botswana became independent. Section 20 of the independence Constitution conferred Botswana citizenship on persons born in the former protectorate who, immediately beforehand, held the status of a CUKC or British protected person. Certain people born outside the territory could qualify through a father who met the constitutional criteria.

The Constitution initially supplied a jus soli for children born in Botswana after independence, with exceptions relating to foreign diplomats and enemy occupation. The legislature of Bechuanaland also enacted the Citizenship of Botswana (Supplementary Provisions) Law, 1966, which commenced at independence. It supplemented the Constitution by establishing procedures for naturalisation and registration, dealing with adoption, and regulating renunciation, loss and deprivation.

==== The 1982 and 1984 restrictions ====
The Citizenship Act 1982 continued to recognise citizenship for some children born in Botswana but restricted the right where nationality of another country was acquired through the father. The Citizenship (Amendment) Act 1984 removed the remaining general territorial birthright and reinforced the paternal basis of acquisition. A child born within marriage generally derived Botswana citizenship through a citizen father; an unmarried citizen mother could transmit citizenship to a child born outside marriage. A foreign woman married to a Botswana man had a preferential route to naturalisation that was not equally available to the foreign husband of a Botswana woman.

=== Dow case and subsequent reforms ===
The discriminatory system was challenged by Unity Dow, a Motswana married to an American. Of their three children, the eldest, born before marriage, had Botswana citizenship through her, while the two born after marriage did not. Their continued residence in Botswana depended on their father's immigration status. Dow argued that a law denying married citizen mothers the same ability as fathers to transmit citizenship interfered with her own constitutional rights.

After Dow succeeded in the High Court, the government appealed. On 3 July 1992, the Court of Appeal held by a majority that section 4 of the citizenship legislation was unconstitutional. It treated section 3 of the Constitution, which guarantees fundamental rights without distinction as to sex, as an operative guarantee of equality notwithstanding the omission of sex from the detailed definition of discrimination in section 15. The majority also considered international human-rights instruments when interpreting the constitutional protections. Two judges dissented, adopting a narrower interpretation of the constitutional text. The appellate court did not decide the validity of section 5, governing children born outside Botswana, because Dow's children did not fall under it.

Parliament eventually enacted the Citizenship (Amendment) Act 1995 which replaced the discriminatory maternal and paternal categories with provisions allowing citizenship to be transmitted by either parent, extended adoption-related rights, and established gender-neutral rules governing the naturalisation of foreign spouses. The legislation was deemed to take effect from 30 November 1982, although the replacement birth and descent sections expressly limited the acquisition of citizenship by people who had not already been citizens at commencement. Botswana's subsequent report to the Committee on the Elimination of Discrimination against Women acknowledged the continuing consequences of that limitation. The government stated that the retrospective commencement did not benefit every adult born before the specified date to a Botswana mother and foreign father, particularly where an affected person could no longer use the child-registration process. Thus, the 1995 changes established gender-neutral statutory rules but did not necessarily resolve the position of every person excluded under the earlier regime.

The Citizenship Act 1998 repealed and re-enacted Botswana's citizenship provisions, incorporating the gender-neutral model while preserving nationality already lawfully acquired. It introduced a general statutory structure dealing with acquisition by birth and descent, adoption, settlement, presidential registration and naturalisation, as well as loss and resumption of citizenship. The original Bill was published in March 1998 and the Act was passed on 8 April that year.

The early amendments altered administrative and substantive aspects of naturalisation. Act No. 9 of 2002 authorised waiver of the language requirement in special circumstances for ordinary and spousal naturalisation; Act No. 1 of 2004 removed the multi-year advance declaration.

=== Modise case ===
In John K. Modise v Botswana, the African Commission on Human and Peoples' Rights considered the nationality of an opposition political activist born in Cape Town to parents from Bechuanaland and raised in the protectorate. The Botswana authorities disputed his entitlement to citizenship and repeatedly removed him to South Africa, which did not acknowledge him as its citizen. In its decision adopted on 6 November 2000, the commission held that Modise had acquired Botswana citizenship at independence through his father and found violations of rights protected by the African Charter on Human and Peoples' Rights, including equality before the law, recognition of legal status, freedom of movement, political participation, property and family life. Botswana's offer of citizenship by registration was held inadequate because that status was not equivalent, for certain political purposes, to citizenship by descent.

== Acquisition of citizenship ==
=== Birth and descent ===
Under the 1998 Citizenship Act, Botswana citizenship generally passes through either parent. Children born in Botswana may acquire citizenship by birth, while those born abroad may qualify by descent. Birth within Botswana does not, however, automatically confer citizenship. The law also covers children born outside marriage and those whose citizen parent died before their birth. The 2024 amendment extended citizenship by birth to certain children born after a parent had renounced Botswana citizenship. It also allowed abandoned children under seven to be recognised as citizens following a High Court ruling. Bringing a child under five into Botswana, or unlawfully assisting with a foundling, to obtain citizenship for the child became an offence.

=== Adoption and registration ===
A non-citizen child aged three or younger adopted by a Botswana citizen automatically acquires citizenship. Older adopted children may be registered on application, although the minister can refuse registration on character grounds where the child is sufficiently mature. Children whose parents subsequently acquire Botswana citizenship may also be registered. The 2004 law set the age limit at 21.

=== Naturalisation ===
Foreign nationals may apply for naturalisation after living in Botswana continuously for the twelve months immediately before applying and for an aggregate of at least ten years during the twelve years preceding that final twelve-month period. Applicants must be of good character, know Setswana or another language spoken by a tribal community in Botswana, and intend to remain in the country. The minister may relax residence requirements in special circumstances or waive the language requirement. Applications are published in the Gazette and a local newspaper, allowing thirty days for objections. The minister considers these alongside the Citizenship Committee's recommendation before deciding. Successful applicants must take an oath of allegiance. The original 1998 Act required applicants to declare their intention to naturalise several years in advance. This requirement was removed for ordinary naturalisation in 2004, although it remained for certain applications by foreign spouses.

Foreign spouses may apply after five years' residence, provided they are living in Botswana when they apply. They must ordinarily declare their intention at least two and a half years beforehand and satisfy character, language and residence requirements, some of which the minister may waive.

=== Citizenship by registration ===
The 1998 Act allowed registration for people who had settled in Botswana before independence and become established members of a community. In 2024, this was replaced with a provision entitling people without citizenship, or any entitlement to nationality, to register after twenty years of continuous lawful residence as members of a community in Botswana. The president may also grant citizenship by registration to people who have rendered distinguished service to Botswana, brought distinction to the country, or qualify under exceptional circumstances.

=== Economic citizenship ===
In September 2025, President Duma Boko announced plans for a citizenship by investment programme. The Citizenship (Amendment) Bill, 2025 introduced a proposed category of economic citizenship. Labour and Home Affairs Minister Pius Mokgware said recipients would not enjoy certain political rights, including voting in national and local elections. During parliamentary debate, Kgatleng East MP Mabuse Pule suggested granting investors permanent residence instead. Parliament approved the bill in December 2025. The subsequent Citizenship (Amendment) Act, 2026 (Act No. 4 of 2026) introduced section 15A governing economic citizenship and commenced on 3 July 2026 under Statutory Instrument No. 100 of 2026.

== Loss, renunciation and restoration ==
Under the 2024 amendment, adult dual citizens may voluntarily renounce Botswana citizenship. Renunciation takes effect once the minister registers their declaration. Anyone who lost Botswana citizenship on or after independence on 30 September 1966 may apply to resume it through a registered declaration.

Citizenship acquired through naturalisation or registration may also be revoked. Under the 2024 law, grounds for ministerial deprivation included fraud, disloyalty, assisting an enemy during hostilities, and living abroad continuously for seven years without notifying the minister of an intention to retain citizenship.

The president could separately deprive registered or naturalised citizens of their nationality for conduct deemed contrary to Botswana's values, interests, peace or security. The 2024 law prohibited this presidential power from rendering someone stateless.

== Dual and multiple citizenship ==
Botswana historically restricted multiple citizenship. Under the 1998 Act, children holding another nationality generally had to choose between citizenships upon reaching adulthood. The 2004 consolidated law required them to renounce their foreign citizenship by age 21 to retain Botswana nationality. Adults who voluntarily acquired another nationality could also lose Botswana citizenship. These restrictions particularly affected children of mixed-nationality parents and Batswana who acquired citizenship abroad.

On 29 April 2022, the High Court ruled in Mathe and Others v Attorney General that sections 15(1) and 15(4), requiring certain dual citizens to choose between nationalities, were unconstitutional. The court found that the restrictions disproportionately interfered with constitutional protections against discrimination and rights concerning movement, association and family life.

The Citizenship (Amendment) Act 2024 subsequently replaced section 15, allowing dual citizens to retain Botswana nationality upon turning 18 unless they formally renounced it. Citizens acquiring another nationality through marriage could retain Botswana citizenship, while those voluntarily acquiring foreign citizenship had to notify the minister within a reasonable period.

== Documentation and statelessness ==
There have been some difficulties obtaining identity documents such as passports; especially after the introduction of biometric passports in 2011 where members of the Bazezuru community were presumed to have foreign nationality.

In 2019, the United Nations Committee on the Rights of the Child raised concerns about unregistered births, especially among children in remote areas and refugee, asylum-seeking and abandoned communities. The 2024 amendments subsequently introduced citizenship provisions for foundlings and certain long-term stateless residents. In May 2026, the United Nations Human Rights Committee welcomed Botswana's progress on statelessness and encouraged it to join the Convention on the Reduction of Statelessness. The following month, the government reported granting citizenship to 64 long-term refugees.

== Commonwealth citizenship ==
Section 19 of the Citizenship Act recognises citizens of Botswana, alongside nationals of other Commonwealth countries, as Commonwealth citizens.

Some Commonwealth states extend political rights to qualifying citizens of other member countries. Thirteen states granting electoral rights to resident Commonwealth citizens: Antigua and Barbuda, Barbados, Belize, Dominica, Grenada, Guyana, Jamaica, Mauritius, Saint Kitts and Nevis, Saint Lucia, Saint Vincent and the Grenadines, Trinidad and Tobago and the United Kingdom. The applicable residence requirements and other conditions vary between jurisdictions.

In the United Kingdom, qualifying Commonwealth citizens may register to vote in parliamentary and local elections, provided they satisfy the applicable age, residence and legal eligibility requirements. A qualifying Commonwealth citizen is one who has permission to enter or remain in the United Kingdom, or who does not require such permission. In Mauritius, Commonwealth citizens aged at least eighteen may qualify for registration after two years' residence or by satisfying the alternative domicile and residence conditions. Saint Lucia requires Commonwealth citizens to have resided continuously in the country for at least seven years, in addition to meeting age and electoral-district residence requirements.

Other Commonwealth jurisdictions permit foreign nationals to vote on the basis of residence rather than Commonwealth citizenship. These include Eswatini, where the constitution recognises certain ordinarily resident non-citizens as eligible voters; Malawi, where non-citizens may qualify after seven years' ordinary residence; and New Zealand, where qualifying residents may vote irrespective of nationality. The Crown Dependencies of Guernsey, Jersey and the Isle of Man, which are constitutionally separate from the United Kingdom, similarly permit qualifying residents to vote without a Commonwealth nationality requirement.

== See also ==
- Visa policy of Botswana
- Visa requirements for Botswana citizens
- Botswana passport
