= Unity Dow =

Motswana politician, writer, and human rights activist (born 1959)

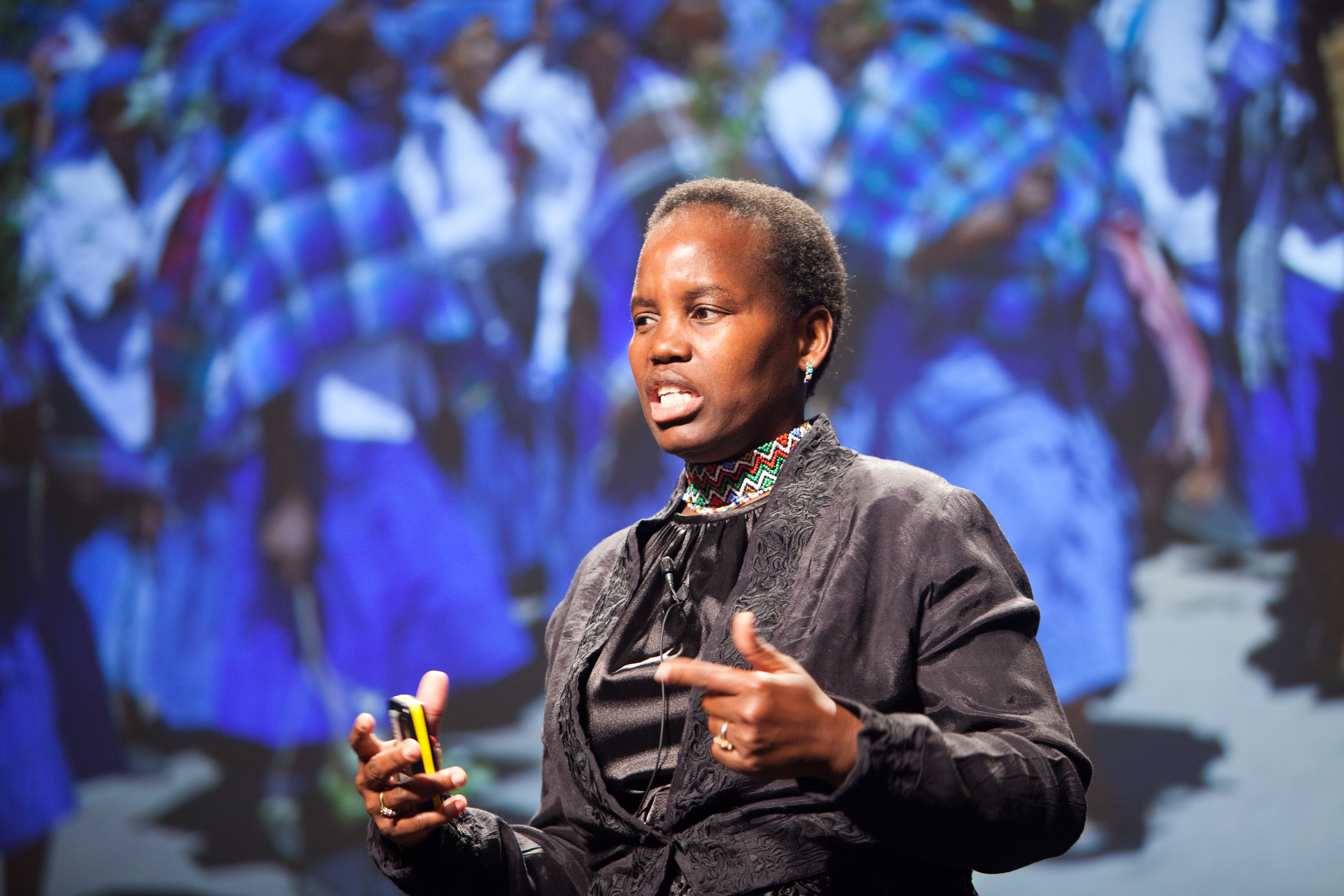
- Dow in 2011

Minister of Foreign Affairs and International Cooperation
- In office 2 November 2019 – 26 August 2020
- President: Mokgweetsi Masisi
- Preceded by: Vincent Seretse
- Succeeded by: Lemogang Kwape

Member of Parliament for Kgatleng West
- Incumbent
- Assumed office 30 October 2024
- Preceded by: Mmusi Kgafela
- Majority: 193 (1.66%)

Specially Elected Member of Parliament
- In office 2 November 2019 – 5 September 2024
- Appointed by: Mokgweetsi Masisi

Personal details
- Born: Unity Diswai; 23 April 1959 (age 67) Mochudi, Bechuanaland Protectorate
- Party: Botswana Congress Party
- Spouse(s): Peter Nathan Dow (m. 1984) Karl J. Stahl (died 2024)
- Children: 3
- Education: University of Botswana and Swaziland (LLB); University of Edinburgh
- Profession: Lawyer, judge, politician, writer, and human rights activist

Unity Dow (née Diswai; born 23 April 1959) is a Motswana (Note: People from Botswana are referred to as Motswana (singular) or Batswana (plural).) lawyer, author, human rights activist, Vice President of Botswana Congress Party and Member of Parliament for Kgatleng West since October 2024. She formerly served as a judge on the High Court of Botswana and in various Botswana government ministries. Born in the Bechuanaland Protectorate to a seamstress and a farmer, who insisted on their children obtaining an education, Dow grew up in a traditional rural village before modernisation. She earned a law degree in 1983 from the University of Botswana and Swaziland, though her studies were completed in Swaziland and University of Edinburgh, Scotland, as Botswana had no law school at the time. After her graduation, Dow opened the first all-woman law firm in Botswana and in 1997 became the first woman to be appointed as a judge to the country's High Court.

During her time in law, Dow was involved in three historic cases in Botswana. In 1992, she was the plaintiff in the landmark legal case, Unity Dow v Attorney-General, which ended the gender discrimination in the nation's nationality laws that had previously not allowed children to derive nationality from their married mothers. The case gained Dow international attention and sparked a wave of changes eliminating gender disparity in nationality laws across Africa. In 2006, as the presiding judge in the case of Roy Sesana and Others v. the Government of Botswana, Dow ruled against the government's actions to prohibit the Basarwa indigenous people from living and hunting on their ancestral lands, forcing them to resettle outside the Central Kalahari Game Reserve. She ruled that the government had to restore basic services, allow the Basarwa to return to the land and obtain hunting permits, and pay damages to those who had been forcibly relocated if they chose not to return. In 2014, Dow served as legal counsel for LEGABIBO (Lesbians, Gays & Bisexuals of Botswana) in their case to register their organisation with the Department of Civil and National Registration and successfully received a ruling for the government to allow the organisation to be registered.

Dow was first elected to the National Assembly in 2014, when she was nominated by President Ian Khama as a special elected member of parliament. She was first appointed as an Assistant Minister of Education and in 2015 became the Minister of Education and Skills Development. Subsequently she served as Minister of Basic Education, Minister of Infrastructure and Housing Development, and Minister of International Affairs and Cooperation, before becoming a backbencher in 2020. She has served on numerous international commissions and committees, evaluating the application of laws affecting the human rights of people in Kenya, Palestine, Rwanda and Sierra Leone. In 2000, Dow began publishing novels, typically focusing on social and legal issues and their impact on gender and power structures. The works examine social practices and exploitation through abuse, violence, and suppression of human rights. She has received numerous accolades and honours for her humanitarian work, including the Legion of Honour in 2010.

== Early life and education ==
Unity Diswai was born on 23 April 1959, in Mochudi, Kgatleng District, Botswana (which at the time was the Bechuanaland Protectorate), to parents Phiri and Maefshane Diswai (also known as Moses and Ellen Diswai), descendants of the Mosarwa indigenous people and members of the BaKgatla tribe. (Note: The Bechuanaland Protectorate terminated on 30 September 1966, when the Republic of Botswana gained independence from Britain.) The rural village in which she grew up had no paved roads, electricity nor running water. There were no telephones and she had not seen a refrigerator until she was a teenager, nor a television until she was twenty. Her mother was a seamstress, who was able to read and write in SeTswana, but not English. Her father, who worked a small farm, spoke and read English. When her father was at school, he won a scholarship to attend the University of Fort Hare, but the scholarship was given to the chief's son instead. For both her parents, education became a priority and six of their seven children completed their university studies. Their Western courses were unusual for rural Botswana at the time. Diswai completed her primary and secondary education in Mochudi. After high school, she studied law at the University of Botswana and Swaziland. Because there was no law school in Botswana at the time, under a British aid program she attended university in Swaziland and completed two years of study in Scotland, at the University of Edinburgh, before she earned her Bachelor of Laws in 1983 from the University of Botswana and Swaziland.

== Law and activism ==
=== Early career (1983–1991) ===
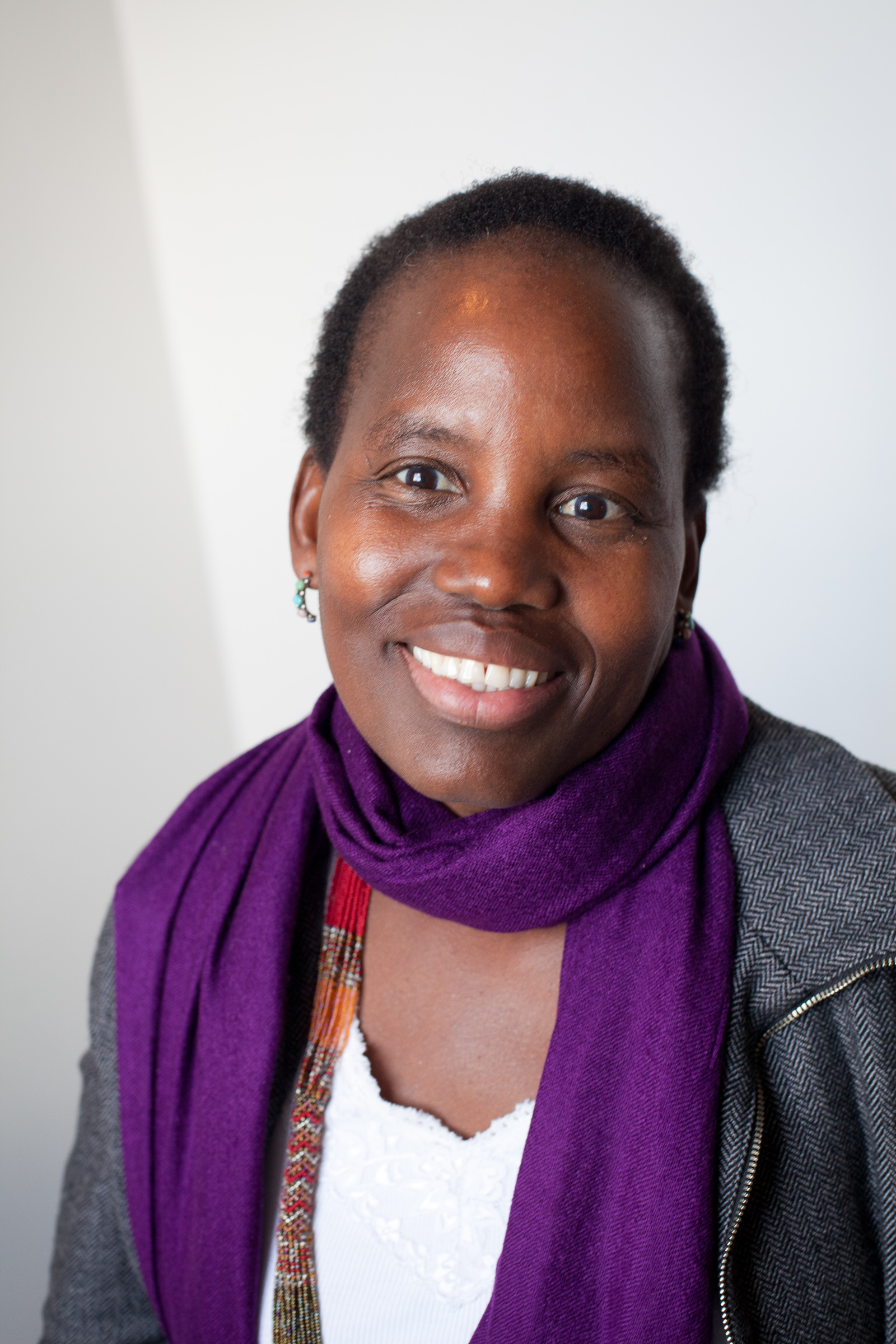
Unity Dow

Diswai qualified as an attorney in 1983 and began working in the chambers of the Attorney-General of Botswana as a criminal prosecutor in Gaborone. She married a United States national, Peter Nathan Dow, on 7 March 1984. The couple made their home in Mochudi, with their three children. In 1986, Dow entered private practice specialising in criminal law, opening the firm Dow Malakaila, the first all-woman law firm in the country. That year, she became one of the founding members of the first women's group in Botswana Emang Basadi (Stand Up for Women). In 1988, the firm's name was later changed to Dow Lesetedi and Company. That year, she co-founded the organisation Women and Law in Southern Africa (WLSA) to advocate for women and children's rights through litigation. From 1988 to 1991, Dow conducted research for WLSA, helping to complete a regional study on human rights for women in six neighboring countries. In 1990, she helped establish the Metlhaetsile Women's Information Centre to promote education on women's rights under the law.

In 1990, Dow filed suit in the High Court of Botswana to challenge the Nationality law of Botswana. Under the 1984 Citizenship Act, only illegitimate children could derive nationality through their mother. As two of her three children with Peter were born after their marriage, they were not considered Batswana. Fearful that there was a possibility that when Peter's residency permit expired in 1992, her family might be forced to move or split up, Dow initiated Unity Dow v Attorney-General, alleging that the Citizenship Law was discriminatory and contravened her right to avoid demeaning and inhumane punishment. The court found in favour of Dow concurring that the law impacted her free choice of whom to marry, could force her to be separated from her family if her husband and children's residency permits were not renewed, and was discriminatory.

=== Middle career (1991–2009) ===
Dow had taken a two-year sabbatical from her law practice in 1991 for the case and during that time, she co-founded the Baobob Primary School in Gaborone and the AIDS Action Trust. She served as a coordinator for WLSA from 1992 to 1994, while the appeal of her case was pending. During the appeal, Attorney General v Unity Dow, the state argued that discrimination against women was protected by the constitutional provisions to preserve the traditional customs of Botswana, which was a patrilineal society. The Attorney General also denied that Dow had standing, claiming she personally had suffered no actual harm. The Court of Appeal, led by Judge President Austin Amissah, concluded that sex discrimination contravened the Constitution and that customary tradition could not override the constitutional provisions for equal protection under the law, or the obligations Botswana had under the international agreements to which it was a signatory. On the issue of standing, the court found that she only had to prove that there was a possibility that she would be harmed by the law, not that she had been, and separation from her family would be degrading and inhumane. In a three to two majority decision, the Court of Appeal affirmed the High Court ruling with slight modifications, declaring Sections 4 and 5 of the Citizenship Act were unconstitutional.

As a result of the landmark ruling, in 1995 the Citizenship Act was amended to remove gender disparity in the acquisition of nationality in Botswana. The ruling became the basis for women's groups throughout Africa to press for change in their nationality laws and eliminate gender disparities, resulting in nearly half of Africa's countries amending legislation on nationality by 2010. From 1994 to 1998, Dow served as the director of the Metlhaetsile Women's Information Centre and during that time published The Citizenship Case in 1995, detailing the legal proceedings of her case. In 1996, she worked on a case involving child maintenance that resulted in an amendment to the laws for support, and in 1997 she presented a case on battered woman syndrome, considering these to be significant issues for women. That year, Dow was appointed as a judge to the High Court of Botswana, and began serving the court in January 1998. Her appointment marked the first time a woman had been appointed to serve as a judge on the High Court.

In 2004, Dow served as part of a United Nations mission to review the domestic application in Sierra Leone of international women's human rights with Ghanaian Charlotte Abaka, former chair of the Committee on the Elimination of Discrimination against Women; Feride Acar, founding chair of the Middle East Technical University's gender and women's studies programme, in Ankara, Turkey; Dorcas Coker-Appiah, Ghanaian lawyer and co-founder of the Gender Studies and Human Rights Documentation Centre in Accra; and South African, Tiyanjana Maluwa, a law professor at Pennsylvania State University. Dow was elected as a commissioner of the International Commission of Jurists in 2004 and re-elected to the post in 2009. In 2006, she was elected to serve on the executive committee of the International Commission of Jurists with six returning commissioners and three new members, including herself, Vojin Dimitrijević of Serbia and Raji Sourani of Palestine.

Dow was the presiding judge, along with Maruping Dibotelo and Mphaphi Phumaphi, for the Roy Sesana and Others v. the Government of Botswana case brought to the High Court in 2002 by the Basarwa people (sometimes referred to as Kalahari bushmen) concerning their removal from their ancestral lands in the Central Kalahari Game Reserve. Sesana and Keiwa Setlhobogwa brought the case on behalf of 241 other litigants when the Government of Botswana terminated the water supply in the reserve, refused to provide health services and transport for school children, stopped food distribution to orphans and the poor, and attempted the forced removal of the Basarwa from their settlements. They amended their case to include the refusal of the Department of Wildlife and National Parks to permit them to enter the reserve without a permit or issue special game licences to them. After a four-year hearing, in 2006, Dow concluded that termination of services and forced relocation of the Basarwa represented an infringement to their constitutionally protected right to life. She ordered that services be restored and that damages should be paid to those who had been relocated and had no wish to return. On the issue of game licences, all three justices concurred that they had been unlawfully withheld, as although the Department of Wildlife was not obligated to issue permits, they had traditionally done so; withholding them while at the same time stopping rations, impacted the Basarwa peoples' ability to sustain themselves. On the issue of permits to enter the reserve, Dow found that they hampered the Basarwa people in exerting their rights of free movement. The case, according to law professor Clement Ng'ong'ola was the first decision in Botswana to recognise the rights of indigenous people to their ancestral lands.

In 2007, Dow served as a member of a special mission of the International Legal Assistance Consortium to assess the Rwandan judicial system and evaluate how the country could emerge from its past of conflict and rehabilitate its justice system to ensure that defendants in the 1994 genocide cases receive a fair trial. One of the last cases upon which she presided concerned a government tax increase on alcoholic beverages. Dow delayed implementation of the 30 per cent increase and the case was ultimately dropped. She retired from the bench in April 2009 to lecture at the Washington and Lee University School of Law in Lexington, Virginia and the University of Cincinnati in Ohio, prior to serving as a visiting professor at Columbia Law School in New York City.

=== Later career (2010–present) ===
In February 2010, Dow founded the legal firm Dow & Associates and that same month was sworn in by the Kenyan President as one of the justices on the Interim Independent Constitutional Dispute Resolution Court to help implement Kenya's new Constitution. In 2011, she was elected as chair of the Executive Committee of the Commissioner of the International Commission of Jurists. That year Dow began to work with Ricki Kgositau and another transgender activist regarding their inability to obtain identity cards with their appropriate gender. At the time in Botswana there was no legal means for transgender people to adjust their gender markers on official documents. When the activists approached the Civil and National Registration office to change their documents, they were advised to obtain a court order. They enlisted Dow to assist them, and she in turn contacted the Southern African Litigation Centre to help with legal aid and financial support. To assure that the matter would be given a fair hearing, and eliminate the possibility of losing the case, a decision was made to establish precedent for LGBT rights in a case with less risk of harm and delay the gender marker cases. (Note: In 2013, both litigants proceeded with new counsel and each won their case to have their gender markers changed in 2017.)

To that end, Dow represented the human rights organisation LEGABIBO (Lesbians, Gays & Bisexuals of Botswana) in their case to register their organisation with the Department of Civil and National Registration. The organisation had been refused registration by both the director of the department and Edwin Batshu, the Minister of Labour and Home Affairs, on the grounds that homosexual acts were illegal in the county. Dow argued that refusing to register the organisation violated the right of free association and advised that the case was not about the right to engage in sexual acts, but whether the members could gather and share their information collectively. In 2014, Justice Terrence Rannowane of the High Court ruled that refusing to register the group and allow them to assemble was in violation of the Constitution, Sections 3, 12, and 13, which grant the right to freedom of expression, freedom of association, and freedom of assembly respectively. (Note: The government appealed the decision and lost. In 2016, the Court of Appeal ordered the Registrar of Societies to register LEGABIBO as required by the Societies Act.)

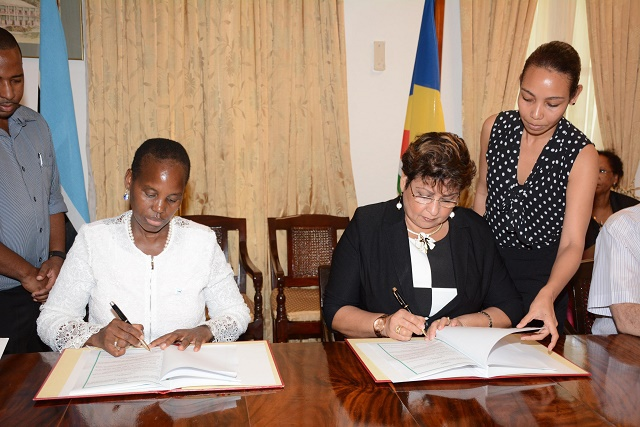
Ministers Dow and Macsuzy Mondon (Seychelles) signing a Memo of Understanding for a teacher exchange program, 2015

On 6 July 2012, Dow was appointed by the United Nations Human Rights Council as one of three independent experts to conduct a fact-finding mission on how Israel's West Bank settlements affect Palestinians. That year, she decided to enter politics and joined the Botswana Democratic Party. She ran in the 2014 general election for the Mochudi West District, but lost her bid for a seat in the National Assembly. On 28 October 2014, Dow was nominated, along with six other candidates, by President Ian Khama of Botswana as a special elected member of parliament. Along with Kenneth Matambo, Kitso Mokaila, and Eric Molale, she won the ballot and was appointed as the Assistant Minister of Education in the Government. In February 2015, she was appointed as Minister of Education and Skills Development by Khama, succeeding Mokgweetsi Masisi, the sitting Vice President of Botswana. During her time in the Ministry, Dow established a programme to train teachers from Seychelles in Botswana and send Batswana teachers abroad to assist Seychelles with their teacher shortage. She served in that capacity until September 2016, when in a cabinet shuffle, she was appointed as Minister of Basic Education.

After Khama stepped down as president in March 2018, Dow was shifted by incoming President Masisi from Education to the post of Minister of Infrastructure and Housing Development. On 20 June 2018, in a cabinet reshuffle, she was named Minister of International Affairs and Cooperation, swapping her seat in Infrastructure and Housing with Vincent Tina Seretse, who had held International Affairs previously. Masisi won the presidency in the 2019 general election and reconfirmed Dow as Minister of International Affairs and Cooperation for the 12th parliament of Botswana. Along with her daughters Cheshe and Natasha, Dow opened the Dow Academy in Mochudi, Kgatleng District in January 2020. The private school offers primary and secondary education. In August 2020, Dow relinquished her ministry and was replaced by Lemogang Kwape in a cabinet reshuffle. Dow said of the move, "As a minister you speak predominantly about your portfolio. But the backbench gives you the liberty to interrogate a wide variety of issues of national interest. The only limitation is my party position on a given subject".

Unity Dow resigned from the BDP and joined the Botswana Congress Party in 2024. She was subsequently elected to become Member of Parliament for Kgatleng West in November 2024 through the BCP. She would later ascend to the Vice Presidency of the BCP in a hotly contested internal election, defeating Party veteran and fellow MP Taolo Lucas.

== Writing ==
In 2000, when Dow began publishing fiction, few Batswana writers had produced works which reached an audience outside Botswana. (Note: Before Dow, both Bessie Head and Alexander McCall Smith had gained international audiences, but both were part of the diaspora, as Head lived in South Africa and Smith resided in Scotland.) One of the reasons for this was the staunch opposition of the Batswana leadership for the British to merge their territory with that of South Africa, which led to a defensive resistance to Pan-Africanism and also a lack of investment in the nation's infrastructure and academic development. Both her non-fiction and fiction works integrate social and legal issues and their impact on gender and power structures. Each of Dow's works examines social practices which lead to an imbalance of power relationships and fuel violence against women, child sexual abuse, the AIDS crisis, and gender inequality. Her characters use common sense to resist unreasonable custom but remind the reader of the importance of traditional culture.

With her first novel, Far and Beyon′ (2000), Dow focused on a central theme of the AIDS epidemic and violence's effects on families, specifically how women living in a patriarchal society cope with fatherless families because of the devastation it led to in rural Botswana. It explores the limits cultural practices, customs, and institutions place upon girls and women by use of male-oriented structures. In the story, Mara, an illiterate mother with limited ability to support herself, has already had one husband and two sons die from AIDS, another husband abandon her, and her third partner abuse her. Mara attributes her sons' deaths to a hidden enemy and seeks answers from a diviner. Though her daughter, Mosadi (meaning woman), known as Mosa, and remaining son, Stan, do not believe the diviner's rituals will explain why their brothers died, they go along with the ceremonies prescribed. When Mosa discovers she is pregnant and abandoned by the father of the child, she decides to have a secret abortion, rather than burden her mother further. In an effort to heal her family, Mosa evaluates social practices which separate men and women and elevate male roles, teaching women to ignore their transgressions. Remaining loyal to her family and culture, she learns to reject the acceptance of reprehensible behaviours in her community. In this way, Dow explores how societal indulgence of and silence about wrongs in society lead to ideological confusion and exploitation of the powerless by those who are more powerful.

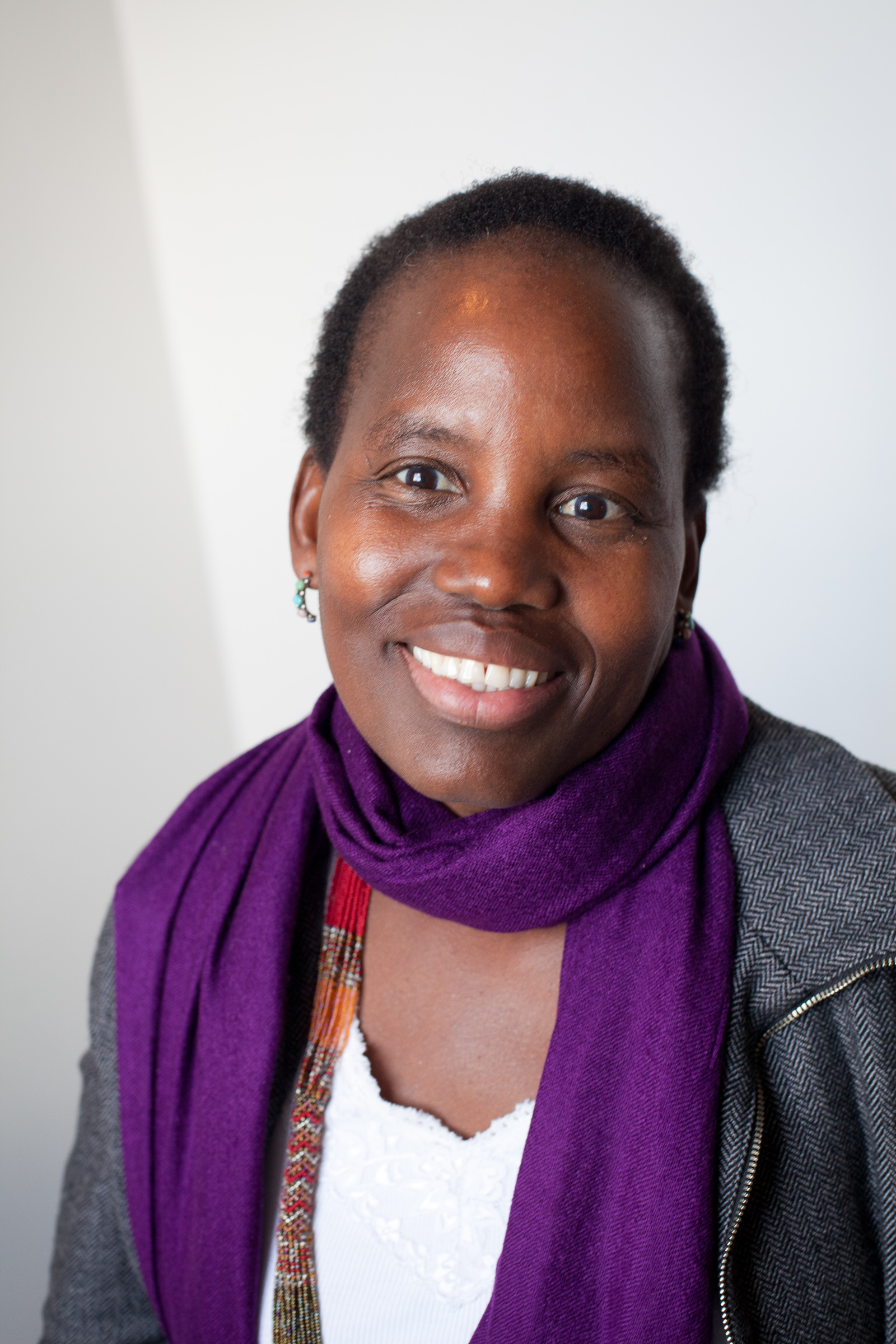
Dow, 2011

Similar themes carried into Dow's second novel, The Screaming of the Innocent (2001), which also examines women's empowerment in a country rife with police corruption, ritual murder, institutional secrecy, and societal silence. Exploring the cultural practice of dipheko, murdering someone to harvest their organs for their magical properties of luck and prosperity, Dow shows how the rich and powerful prey upon the illiterate rural population and buy the silence of authorities. In the book, a little girl is murdered in the bush near her village and information about the case has been suppressed by the police and powerful men of her area. Her dismemberment is hidden in the novel as a symbolic representation of the lack of acknowledgement of such practices in society at large. The protagonist, Amantle Bokaa, who is completing her national service (known in Botswana as Tirelo Sechaba), discovers bloody clothes in a closet of the clinic to which she has been assigned. The clothes belong to an earlier victim, but when presented to the villagers awaken awareness that the fact had been hidden from them. Bokaa, because the villagers believe she will not be viewed in the negative light the authorities hold them, is chosen to speak to the police on behalf of the villagers. Because she is female and a child, she would appear to be powerless, but her education, which taught her the skills to deal with opposition and question beliefs, gives her the power and confidence to challenge the code of silence and social barriers in her way. Dow's work not only draws a spotlight on power relationships, but upon the horrors of ritual murder and femicide. She makes clear her belief that women will be the drivers of changes in policy to end such practices.

Far and Beyon′ was first issued in Botswana and subsequently published in Australia. The Screaming of the Innocent was first published in Australia and republished in South Africa in 2003. Her third novel, Juggling Truths, was published that year in Australia and released the following year in South Africa. Dow again evaluated reprehensible cultural practices and social norms with strategies for combating them. Though she previously explored African society and issues caused by opposing Western modernity and local traditionalism, the work focuses on the balancing act of coming to terms with wholesome and unwholesome practices within the local culture. Using the character of Monei, a young girl living in a rural village, Dow examines oral traditions and the use of folklore and legends as an means to instill moral guideposts and as a social control for children. The book questions such topics as the beliefs that killing a monitor lizard leads to torrential storms, that befriending someone with albinism will bring bad luck, or that drinking bull's urine will help one learn to whistle. It also includes tales of a male monster who swallows children and a priest who sexually preys on young girls. The themes in the story link Juggling Truths to Dow's first two novels and suggest that girls and women are able to develop their strength through education and independent thinking. Dow approaches her analysis of social complexity using a variety of interventions, recognising that there are no simple solutions. Juggling Truths was a nominee for the Percy FitzPatrick Prize in the young adults category in 2006.

Dow's 2007 book The Heavens May Fall deals with identities in transition from traditional society to a modern globalised world. In Dow's eyes, society is constantly changing; as a result, custom, gender, identity, language, social construction, and institutions are fluid. A reflection of Dow's own life, the story tells of the transition from no paved roads to indoor plumbing and how diamond wealth provided access to education, health care, and utilities. The book is dedicated to her three children, reiterating how perceptions about them have transformed, as they are African, but also share a more complex identity because their father was a US national. In the time the story unfolds they would have been seen by society as foreign. The story tells of Naledi, born before Botswana's modernisation and takes place in the time of Dow's challenge to the nationality law. As a lawyer, Naledi represents vulnerable women and children who need arbitration or legal assistance. She takes a case of a teenaged rape victim and exposes the complicity of the male-dominated legal system, which dismissed the case without a hearing. Though the case is unresolved, the accused was ordered to undergo an HIV test, because his victim had been exposed to unprotected sex, which underscores societal changes and fluidity. Maleness did not give the accused the privilege or power to avoid the test in a country where the legal system has safeguards to include protection for women, despite the fact that the legal system ultimately failed Naledi.

Dow contributed to the book Schicksal Afrika (Fate of Africa) compiled by the former German President Horst Köhler in 2010, which collected works by well-known authors. Her essay focused on colonialism and the distrust Africa has developed for its own wisdom. That year, she also published Saturday Is for Funerals with Max Essex, a Harvard professor and AIDS researcher. The book is written as a conversation between Dow and Essex. She begins each chapter, telling a true story of a person affected by HIV/AIDS, which is followed by Essex's commentary about testing, antiretroviral drugs, and solutions for Botswana's status as the country with the third highest HIV rate in the world. Though Helen Epstein, a molecular biologist and journalist who writes about HIV/AIDS, lamented that most of Essex's solutions required high technology, she found Dow's stories compelling and showed a willingness of Batswana society to frankly and compassionately tackle its problem with the disease. Fetson Kalua, a professor of English Studies at the University of South Africa, called Dow "the most influential writer of fiction in Botswana today".

== Honours and awards ==
Dow has been the recipient of numerous awards and honours, including honorary doctorates of law from Kenyon College (Gambier, Ohio, 2001), Saint Michael's College (Colchester, Vermont, 2007), and the University of Edinburgh (Edinburgh, Scotland, 2009). She has been recognised for her human rights work with the William Brennan Human Rights Award (2003) of Rutgers University in New Brunswick, New Jersey; the Phyllis N. Stern Distinguished Lectureship Award (2008) of the International Council on Women's Health Issues; and the Prominent Women in International Law Award (2009) of the American Society of International Law's Women in International Law Interest Group. She was also a nominee for the Harvard Law School's Women Inspiring Change exhibit (2014). On 14 July 2010, she was awarded the Legion of Honour by the French Ambassador to Botswana, Geneviève Iancu. She was honoured with the Global Achievement Award of the Middle East Excellence Award Institute of Dubai for her work in peace and human development initiatives on 11 November 2012.

== Selected works ==
=== Academic ===
- Dow, Unity; Mogwe, Alice (1992). The Convention on the Rights of the Child and the Legal Status of Children in Botswana: A Consultancy Report for UNICEF, Botswana. Gaborone, Botswana: Women and Law in Southern Africa. OCLC 474483768.
- Dow, Unity; Kidd, Puseletso (1994). Women, Marriage, and Inheritance. Gaborone, Botswana: Women and Law in Southern Africa Trust. ISBN 978-99912-0-153-5.
- Dow, Unity (1995). The Citizenship Case: The Attorney General of the Republic of Botswana vs Unity Dow. Gaborone, Botswana: Lentswe La Lesedi. OCLC 718046544.
- Dow, Unity (1999). "Domestic Application of Regional and International Treaties in Africa, with Specific Reference to Women's Rights". In Ankumah, Evelyn A.; Kwakwa, Edward K. (eds.). The Legal Profession and the Protection of Human Rights in Africa. Maastricht, The Netherlands: Africa Legal Aid. pp. 69–78. ISBN 90-76441-01-4. OCLC 772508198.
- Dow, Unity (2000). "National Implementation of International Law: The Dow Case". In Tokman, Victor E.; United Nations Division for the Advancement of Women (eds.). Bringing International Human Rights Law Home: Judicial Colloquium on the Domestic Application of the Convention on the Elimination of All Forms of Discrimination against Women and the Convention on the Rights of the Child. New York: United Nations. pp. 112–116. ISBN 92-1-130204-8. OCLC 717000925.
- Dow, Unity (2010). "Kapitel V – Werte und Traditionen: Diamanten bedeuten Liebe. Kühe etwa nicht? [Chapter V – Diamonds Mean Love. Aren't They Cows?]". In Köhler, Horst (ed.). Schicksal Afrika: Denkanstöße und Erfahrungsberichte [Fate of Africa: Food for Thought and Experience Reports] (in German) (Originalausgabe ed.). Reinbek bei Hamburg: Rowohlt Verlag. pp. 263–267. ISBN 978-3-499-62644-9.
- Dow, J. U. (2001). How the global informs the local: The Botswana citizenship case. Health Care for Women International, 22(4), 319-331. https://doi.org/10.1080/07399330120965

=== Literary ===
- Dow, Unity (2000). Far and Beyon'. Melbourne, Australia: Spinifex Press. OCLC 8106613885.
- Dow, Unity (2002). The Screaming of the Innocent. Melbourne, Australia: Spinifex Press. OCLC 8106611734.
- Dow, Unity (2003). Juggling Truths. Melbourne, Australia: Spinifex Press. OCLC 8106610182.
- Dow, Unity (2007). The Heavens May Fall. Melbourne, Australia: Spinifex Press. ISBN 978-1-876756-48-2.
- Dow, Unity; Stielau, Jo (2009). I Know You Still Love Me: Stories about Living with HIV and AIDS. Cape Town, South Africa: Maskew Miller Longman. ISBN 978-0-636-09432-1.
- Dow, Unity; Essex, Myron (2010). Saturday Is for Funerals. Cambridge, Massachusetts: Harvard University Press. ISBN 978-0-674-05077-8.

== See also ==
- First women lawyers around the world
