= Visa policy of Botswana =

Policy on permits required to enter Botswana

Visitors to Botswana must obtain an e-Visa unless they are citizens from one of the visa-exempt countries.

All visitors (except Namibia) must hold a passport valid for at least 6 months from the date of arrival.

== Visa policy map ==
External image
- Botswana international border crossing points

Visa policy of Botswana Botswana Visa not required (90 days) eVisa

== Visa exemption ==
=== Ordinary passports ===
Citizens of the following countries and territories may enter Botswana without a visa for up to 90 days within any 365-day period (unless otherwise stated):

- All European Union member states

- Angola
- Antigua and Barbuda
- Argentina
- Australia
- Bahamas
- Bahrain
- Barbados
- Belize
- Brazil
- Brunei
- Canada
- Chile
- Costa Rica
- Cuba
- Dominica
- Dominican Republic
- Eswatini
- Gambia
- Grenada
- Guyana
- Hong Kong
- Iceland
- Israel
- Jamaica
- Japan
- Kenya
- Kiribati
- Kuwait
- Lesotho
- Liechtenstein
- Malawi
- Malaysia
- Maldives
- Mauritius
- Mexico
- Monaco
- Mozambique
- Namibia^{ID}
- Nauru
- New Zealand
- Norway
- Oman
- Papua New Guinea
- Paraguay
- Peru
- Qatar
- Russia^{1}
- Samoa
- Saint Kitts and Nevis
- Saint Lucia
- Saint Vincent and the Grenadines
- Samoa
- San Marino
- Saudi Arabia
- Seychelles
- Sierra Leone
- Singapore
- Solomon Islands
- South Africa
- South Korea
- South Sudan
- Switzerland
- Tanzania
- Tonga
- Trinidad and Tobago
- Turkey
- Tuvalu
- Uganda
- United Arab Emirates
- United Kingdom
- United States
- Uruguay
- Vanuatu
- Vatican City
- Venezuela
- Zambia
- Zimbabwe

_{ID - May enter with an ID card in lieu of a passport.}
_{1 - 30 days, but no more than 90 days within any 365-day period.}

Botswana and Namibia signed an agreement in February 2023 allowing citizens to travel between the two countries using only identity cards, with passports no longer needed. Botswana has held talks with Zimbabwe to achieve a similar deal, and expects to open talks with Zambia.

=== Non-ordinary passports ===
In addition to countries who are already visa-exempt, holders of diplomatic, official or service passports of China and diplomatic passports only of India do not require a visa to enter Botswana for up to 30 days.

== Electronic visa (e-Visa) ==
On 12 August 2021, Botswana launched an electronic visa system, all countries that needed prior visa, are now eligible for e-Visa.

Ministry of foreign affairs of Botswana stated that they introduced an e-Visa system to boost tourism and business in country.

== Visitor statistics ==
Most visitors arriving in Botswana were from the following countries of nationality:

Country	2016	2015	2014	2013
Zimbabwe	874,169	967,322	784,720	825,717
South Africa	759,564	808,118	600,387	742,639
Zambia	220,649	202,289	188,351	331,799
Namibia	187,044	170,326	162,453	169,733
United States	52,171	49,451	49,961	139,752
United Kingdom	42,534	41,011	39,675	47,929
Germany	35,288	32,230	34,576	43,674
India	19,297	17,413	18,342	13,543
Lesotho	18,773	18,842	12,408	10,839
Malawi	17,102	20,607	15,175	17,386
Total	2,401,786	2,501,616	2,082,521	2,598,158

== See also ==
- Visa requirements for Botswana citizens
