= LEGABIBO =

Botswana LGBT advocacy group

- Lesbians, Gays & Bisexuals of Botswana
- Formation: 1998; 28 years ago
- Type: Human rights advocacy group
- Purpose: Seek legal and social rights for Botswana's LGBT community
- Location: Botswana
- Affiliations: Ditshwanelo
- Website: legabibo.org.bw

The Lesbians, Gays & Bisexuals of Botswana (LEGABIBO) is a Botswana human rights advocacy group with the primary objective of seeking legal and social rights for the LGBT community in Botswana. It is the first LGBT focused organization to be registered in Botswana after years of official opposition. The organization aims to reduce discrimination of LGBT individuals and advocate the recognition of same sex couples for the purpose of adoption, accessing social benefits and same-sex marriage.

== History ==
LEGABIBO was initiated in 1998 under the auspices of Ditshwanelo, a human rights NGO to be a side project that represents an informal community of lesbians and gays in Botswana. Getting official recognition and legal protection for same-sex relationships in conservative Botswana was a goal of the informal group. However, registration of the organization proved to be a challenge in Botswana because government officials felt practice of same-sex relationships violates section 164 of the penal code and others felt registration of a gay rights organization will create disorder in the society.

In the initial stages of its existence, the organization failed to attract enough resources to sustain its activities until BONELA (Botswana Network of Ethics, Law and HIV) decided to provide some support. BONELA gave the organization support for its legal struggles and office space to coordinate activities and host workshops to discuss issues affecting the LGBT community in Botswana. In 2005, LEGABIBO applied for registration, its first attempt to force the government to make a decision on its position and interpretation of the law concerning the registration of LGBT NGOs. After two years, the application was refused. In 2012, the organization re-applied for registration with the Botswana's Civil and National Registration department but was denied registration on the basis that the constitution does not recognize same-sex unions and objectives of the group contravenes section 7(2) of the Societies Act. The refusal was challenged by LEGABIBO, which was represented by former High Court judge Unity Dow, with the support of BONELA, the Southern Africa Litigation Centre (SALC) and the Open Society Initiative of Southern Africa (OSISA). The group achieved favorable judgement in the high court in November 2014 and in the Court of Appeal in March 2016.

== Events ==
=== Batho Ba Lorato ===
LEGABIBO host Batho Ba Lorato, a queer film festival to raise awareness about LGBT issues, promote freedom of expression and tolerance. The third festival was held on February 28, 2015, at the University of Botswana auditorium.

=== International Day Against Homophobia and Transphobia ===
The organization with BONELA celebrates the International Day Against Homophobia and Transphobia and uses the occasion to raise awareness about human rights concerns. In 2015, the event was used to campaign against the mutilation of intersex babies.
