= Attorney General of Botswana v. Unity Dow =

Court of Appeal case in the Republic of Botswana

Attorney General of Botswana v. Unity Dow (sometimes abbreviated Attorney General v. Dow, Civil Appeal No. 4/91, and known locally as the Citizenship Case or Dow Case) was a landmark decision of Botswana's Court of Appeal. The case upheld the decision brought to the High Court of Botswana, by the lawyer, Unity Dow, who would go on to become a judge on the High Court and a government minister. It declared provisions of the 1984 Citizenship Act, which barred children from receiving nationality from their mothers, to be unconstitutional. It resulted in the passage of the 1995 Citizenship Act of Botswana, which eliminated gender disparities in the law. The case sparked women to press for changes to nationality laws across Africa.

== Background ==
In 1990, Unity Dow, a Motswana (Note: Persons from Botswana are referred to as Motswana (singular) or Batswana (plural).) lawyer and the plaintiff filing suit in the High Court of the Republic of Botswana challenged the nationality statues of Botswana. The action, Unity Dow v Attorney-General (Botswana) (High Court of Botswana Misca. 124/1990), argued that the 1984 Citizenship Act was discriminatory because it did not allow children the equal ability to derive nationality from their parents. Dow was an indigenous Mosarwa woman who had a child with Peter Nathan Dow, a US national, in 1979. The couple married on 7 March 1984 and subsequently had two other children. Because of the provisions of the 1984 Citizenship Act, the Dows' oldest child was able to acquire Motswana nationality because she was born outside of wedlock. Their two youngest children were ineligible to derive nationality from their mother because their parents were legally married. Under Section 4 of the Citizenship Act, legitimate children could only derive Motswana nationality if their father was a citizen of Botswana, despite the fact that they were born in the country and had lived there their entire life.

Dow argued that under the constitution, all citizens were granted rights without distinction to belief, color, creed, origin, race or sex; were barred from receiving inhuman or degrading punishments; and were granted freedom of movement. She argued that Section 15 prohibited laws from making provisions that were discriminatory. High Court judge, Martin Horowitz found in favor of Dow, concurring that the law impacted her free choice of whom to marry, could force her to be separated from her family if her husband and children's residency permits were not renewed, and was discriminatory.

== Appeal ==
The government filed an appeal in 1992, Attorney General of Botswana v. Unity Dow making the argument to the Court of Appeal that Dow did not have standing to challenge the law, as she personally suffered no harm, and that the constitution provided no right to citizenship or the ability to pass citizenship on to offspring. The Attorney General also argued that the omission of the word "sex" in Section 15 (3) of the Constitution was designed to allow for the customary patrilineal organization of society and preservation of the traditional customs regarding the treatment of Motswana women and therefore, the Citizenship Act was not discriminatory because it followed custom. He justified the sex-based discrimination in the Citizenship Act as necessary to preserve the male-oriented custom of Motswana society and prevent dual nationality.

Austin Amissah, Judge President of the Court of Appeal, evaluated Chapter II, Section 3, of the Botswanan Constitution which lists individual's fundamental rights and freedoms, and Section 18, which contains provisions to enforce fundamental rights of the Constitution. He found that Section 3 specifically mentioned "sex" as a characteristic defining entitlement of those fundamental rights. As it was the foundational provision of Chapter II in defining the rights and freedoms to which every person is entitled, fundamental rights could not be infringed except in the case that they impact public interests or the enjoyment of rights by others. He further found that Chapter II, Section 15 could not be separated from Section 3, as all other provisions in Chapter II of the Constitution were founded upon Section 3. He concluded that as discrimination is not mentioned in Section 3, unequal treatment could not be allowed to limit the rights and freedoms outlined in it. Specifically, Amissah stated, "I know of no principle of construction in law which says that a fundamental right conferred by the Constitution on an individual can be circumscribed by a definition in another Section for the purposes of that other Section". Maintaining that custom cannot override the constitution, as the Constitution is preeminent, he reiterated that equal protection of their rights under the law is afforded to any person, male or female, and was expressly required by the African Charter on Human and Peoples' Rights, the Convention on the Elimination of All Forms of Discrimination Against Women and the Universal Declaration of Human Rights, to which Botswana was internationally obligated. The majority of the justices, Amissah, Akinola Aguda, and George Bizos determined that under the merits of the case, the Constitution forbade gender-based discrimination.

As for standing, Amissah noted that the respondent (Dow) merely had to have a reasonable belief that her rights might be breached to seek redress from the court. Justice Aguda agreed, stating that if Dow's husband and children were refused admission to Botswana, she would rightly feel that she had been subjected to degrading treatment and could seek relief on those grounds. The majority of justices, Amissah, Aguda, Bizos and Bill Schreiner, concurred that Dow had standing. The full bench of the Court of Appeal in a 3 to 2 majority affirmed the High Court decision with slight modifications, declaring Sections 4 and 5 of the 1982 Citizenship Act, as amended in 1984, unconstitutional. Amissah, Aguda, and Bizos joined in the majority with Cedric Puckrin and Schreiner in the minority.

== Impact ==
The case became landmark litigation in Africa. In 1995, a new Citizenship Act was passed in Botswana, which eliminated gender disparities in the law. The case empowered women activists to press for changes to nationality laws across Africa. By 2010, changes had been made to the nationality laws in Algeria, Burkina Faso, Burundi, Djibouti, Egypt, Ethiopia, Gambia, Ivory Coast, Kenya, Lesotho, Mali, Mauritius, Morocco, Niger, Rwanda, Senegal, Sierra Leone, Tunisia, Uganda, and Zimbabwe, to eliminate at least some of the gender-based discrimination in their nationality laws. Before 2018, 42 of the 54 African countries had changed laws which had restricted women from passing their nationality to their children. The case thrust Dow into the national and international spotlight and in 1997, she was appointed as the first woman to serve on the High Court of Botswana. In 2014, she was elected as a Special Elected Member of Parliament and served the government in various ministries until 2020, when she became a backbencher.
