= Commission nationale consultative des droits de l'homme =

French governmental organization

National Consultative Commission on Human Rights
- Commission nationale consultative des droits de l'homme

Agency overview
- Formed: March 17, 1947; 79 years ago
- Headquarters: 20 Avenue de Ségur Paris 75007
- Agency executive: Christine Lazerges, Présidente
- Website: www.cncdh.fr

The Commission nationale consultative des droits de l'homme (National Consultative Commission on Human Rights, CNCDH) is a French governmental organization created in 1947 by an arrêté from the Ministry of Foreign Affairs to monitor the respect for human rights in the country. It may acts as counsellor for the government and propose laws, and then survey the application of governmental measures and laws voted in Parliament.

The CNCDH is under the authority of the prime minister, and presided over by a director, Christine Lazerges, who can be summoned by the office of the P.M., or who can take the initiative in consulting with them. The 1990 Gayssot Act tasks the CNCDH of providing a yearly report on the state of the struggle against racism in France.

It is composed of

- state representatives, for the prime minister and for each 17 concerned ministers
- one deputy named by the president of the National Assembly
- one senator named by the president of the Senate
- members of the Conseil d'État and magistrates, which assured a juridical coherence to the CNCDH's advises
- one mediator of the Republic insuring relations between private persons and administrations
- representatives of 33 human rights NGOs
- representatives of trade unions confederations
- civil society personalities, representing for instance Catholic institutions, as well as Protestant, Muslim, Jewish, or university teachers, sociologists, etc.
- "experts" working in international bodies concerned with human rights issues

== See also ==
- National human rights institutions
- French Equal Opportunities and Anti-Discrimination Commission
