= Constitution of Botswana =

Supreme law of Botswana

Constitution of the Republic of Botswana

Overview
- Jurisdiction: Botswana
- Date effective: 30 September 1966
- System: Republic

Government structure
- Branches: Three
- Chambers: Unicameral (National Assembly)
- Executive: President
- Judiciary: High Court

History
- Amendments: 16
- Last amended: 1 February 2021

Full text
- Constitution of the Republic of Botswana at Wikisource

The Constitution of Botswana is the supreme law of Botswana, and was commenced on September 30, 1966.

== Background ==
Before colonial rule was established in Botswana, a traditional constitution – a body of laws known as molao – was used by tribal chiefs, or diKgosi, of the Botswana people. During the early years of the Bechuanaland Protectorate, some non-Botswana also came to be ruled by these laws. Protectorate administrators kept elements, though not all, of this traditional constitution; much of it has lapsed today.

In 1959, a Constitutional Committee of the Joint Advisory Council drew up the Protectorate's first formal constitution, which came into operation in 1960. In 1963 consultations began for a second constitution which would confer self-government. The 1965 general election was held under this constitution, which was modelled on the Westminster system of parliamentary democracy: there was a unicameral legislature; a prime minister and cabinet of five ministers responsible to the legislature; and a purely consultative Ntlo ya Dikgosi.

When Botswana achieved full independence on 30 September 1966, the prime minister was replaced by a president elected by the legislature (renamed the National Assembly), and given executive powers.

A series of later amendments to the Constitution have increased the number of elected members of the National Assembly, and the size of the Ntlo ya Dikgosi. Other constitutional changes were made in 1994 and 1997.

== Structure ==
The constitution is divided into 9 chapters, each detailing certain areas such as individual rights and the delegation of executive powers.

1. The Republic
2. Protection of Fundamental Rights and Freedoms of the Individual
3. Citizenship
4. The Executive
5. Parliament
6. The Judicature
7. The Public Service
8. Finance
9. Miscellaneous

=== The Republic ===
This section declares Botswana an independent nation as well as defines the public seal.

=== Protection of Fundamental Rights and Freedoms of the Individual ===
This section defines the rights of the citizens. It begins by stating that everyone is guaranteed rights regardless of race, creed, or sex. The rights are as follows: "(a) life, liberty, security of the person and the protection of the law; (b) freedom of conscience, of expression and of assembly and association; and (c) protection for the privacy of his or her home and other property and from deprivation of property without compensation, the provisions of this Chapter shall have effect for the purpose of affording protection to those rights and freedoms subject to such limitations of that protection as are contained in those provisions, being limitations designed to ensure that the enjoyment of the said rights and freedoms by any individual does not prejudice the rights and freedoms of others or the public interest.

=== The Executive ===
This section defines the executive branch including the President, Vice President, and Cabinet.

==== The President ====
The President is the chief executive of the state. The President is elected president by members of the National Assembly. These members state on the ballot who they would support for President if elected, and after election to the National Assembly vote for whomever they indicated they would elect as President. The President has the following requirements: (a) is a citizen of Botswana by birth or descent; (b) has attained the age of 22 years; (c) is qualified to be elected as a Member of the National Assembly and (d) is in possession of a verified University of Cambridge qualification. The President's term is limited up to 10 years, or however long the President holds office in the National Assembly.

The executive power of Botswana resides solely in the President. The President is also the commander of the armed forces. The president also has the power to pardon a person convicted of a crime.

==== The Vice President ====
The Vice President is chosen by the President from among the members of the National Assembly. The Vice President takes over for the President when the President is unable to fulfill his duties either because of illness, death, or other reasons.

The Vice President is second-in-command to the President and carries out the missions of the President.

==== The Cabinet ====
This Cabinet is composed of the President, the Vice President and no more than six ministers who are appointed by the President from the National Assembly. The Ministers in the Cabinet are responsible for advising the President with respect to policy of the government.

=== Parliament ===
This section describes both the National Assembly as well as the Ntlo ya Dikgosi which together create the Parliament of Botswana.

==== National Assembly ====
The Parliament consists of the President and National Assembly. The president is a voting member of the National Assembly. There are an additional 57 elected members of the National Assembly. There is also a speaker of the Assembly who is elected by the members of the Assembly, but does not necessarily have to be a member of the assembly themselves. There is also a deputy speaker elected by the Assembly.

In order for a person to be eligible to be a member of the Assembly they must: be a citizen of Botswana, be 18 years old, is registered to vote, and is able to speak and read in English. There are many conditions that disqualify a member from eligibility, most of these dealing with allegiance to other countries.

Botswana is divided into the number of constituencies that they have members of parliament so that each district sends one member to the Assembly. People in Botswana are eligible to vote if they are: 18, a citizen, and have resided in Botswana for 12 consecutive months.

==== Ntlo ya Dikgosi ====
In addition to a parliament, Botswana also has a Ntlo ya Dikgosi. The Ntlo ya Dikgosi acts as an advisory body to the Parliament of Botswana. This body consists of 33–35 members. In order to be eligible to be a member one must be 21 years old and a citizen. There are similar disqualifying conditions for this body as there are for the National Assembly. The member is appointed for 5 year terms. No member may participate in party politics, and many members are tribal chiefs. This body possesses no legislative power, including approval or veto power, rather they advise the Parliament on bills and measures. A power the body does have is to summon members of the government to appear before it.

=== The Judicature ===
This section describes the varying parts of the judiciary in Botswana including the High Court, the Court of Appeal, and the Judicial Service Commission.

==== High Court ====
The High Court of Botswana acts as the supreme legal source, in which the court possesses unlimited original jurisdiction to hear any cases. The court has a Chief Judge as well as a number of other judges, in which the number is determined by the Parliament. The Chief Justice is appointed by the President, as well as all of the other Justices but these can be advised to the President by the Parliament. In order to be qualified to be a judge on this court one must have either been a judge, been an attorney, been a law professor with a law degree, or been a Chief Magistrate. Appointments to this court are until the person reaches the age of 70. The only other reason a judge would leave the high court is if the Parliament decides the person is no longer able to properly perform their duties.

The High Court has authority to interpret the constitution. If there is disagreement on any interpretation, that disagreement is settled by the High Court.

==== Court of Appeals ====
The Court of Appeals has the right to hear any case in Botswana in which one party has appealed the decision found. This court consists of a President of the Court of appeals, a number of other judges, and the entirety of the High Court. Like the High Court, the President is appointed by the President as are the other judges, with the advice of Parliament. In order to be qualified a person must have been either a judge, attorney, or law professor. As is with the High Court a person is appointed until the age of 70, barring Parliament does not find them incapable during their tenure.

==== Judicial Service Commission ====
The Judicial Service Commission is created to help advise the President on judicial nominations. It consists of the Chief Justice, the President of the Court of Appeals, the Attorney-General, the Chairman of the Public Service Commission, a member of the Law Society nominated by the Law Society, and a person of integrity and experience who is not a legal practitioner appointed by the President.

=== The Public Service ===
This section details rules and regulations regarding public service. This section states anything not stated in the constitution or by an act of Parliament will be under the jurisdiction of the President. There will also be a Public Service Commission of 2–4 members serving 3 year terms. This commission hears all appeals of public servants who have been removed from their position and would like to return to it. If a person disagrees with the ruling of this commission they may appeal directly to the President. The President is allowed to appoint or remove people to or from: Ambassador, High Commissioner, Secretary to the Cabinet, Attorney-General, Director of Public Prosecutions, Permanent Secretary, Commissioner of Police, and f. any other superscale office. This section also establishes 5 year renewable terms for the Director of Public Prosecutions as well as establishes a 60 year age limit for the Director of Public Prosecutions and the Auditor-General. Finally, this section protects pre-existing pensions for people receiving pension before the creation of the Constitution.

=== Finance ===
This section describes the varying financial rules. It begins by setting up a Consolidation Fund in which all revenue made by the country will be combined into one fund. Parliament regulates the use of this fund. Contingency funds may also be created by Parliament in emergencies in order to make it easier to use funds outside of the Consolidation Fund. There is an Auditor General position who is accountable for the accounts of the country.

=== Miscellaneous ===
The final part of the Constitution details 3 main ideas. First, it establishes a process for a public servant to resign from their position. Second, it states a person can be reappointed to a public servant position unless explicitly not allowed by the Constitution or a law of Parliament. Third, it defines shortened versions of phrases used such as "Assembly" for the National Assembly.

== Scholarly critiques of the Constitution ==
While the constitution has been relatively stable in terms of being the governing document, some scholars, including Gretchen Bauer, Druscilla Scribner, and John Holm, have argued that the constitution does not adequately protect women or minorities. In Botswana, there have been movements in order to try and establish gender quotas in the constitution, so that women are more able to win seats in the National Assembly. This is due to the county's first-past-the-post electoral system, which makes it more difficult for women of any party to win seats. Although gender quota initiatives in the country have been largely ineffective, some scholars argue that they prove that the constitution has failed to account for the need of constitutional provisions protecting female representation.

Botswana's constitution is noted for being extremely gender neutral, with only one reference to sex in the entire document. Some argue that this is beneficial as to show gender equality; however, others point to this gender neutrality as acceptance of de facto discrimination. Those who argue this state that women have to fight for laws in the negative, in that they have to get laws to allow them to do things that should already be granted to them in the constitution.

Another criticism of the constitution is that it was written by the current, and so far only, ruling party in the country. The Bechuanaland Democratic party (BDP) was founded by Seretse Khama before Botswana was an independent nation, and since the country's independence the BDP has been the only party to rule, although elected through democratic elections. Due to the continuous rule of this single party, many fear that the constitution in place unfairly biases the electorate toward the party and its supporters. This has also led to criticism about class and ethnicity conflict.

Some praise the constitution for its allowance of political competition. Because the National Assembly is elected democratically by the people, it allows for minority representation in the Assembly. This is important because minority voices can be hidden in certain electoral systems, but some assert that the constitution of Botswana protects the voices of the minorities.

Another argument that some scholars make is in reference to the power of the President. The constitution places a lot of power in the position of President, and as the country has had only one ruling party there is little checks in place on who becomes President and who is able to advise and consent to certain presidential actions. This has led some scholars to call for direct elections of the President so that the President is held more accountable by the people as well as by the National Assembly.

Another criticism is the constitutions handling of tribes and tribal law. The constitution supports the tribal system, including the Ntlo ya Dikgosi or tribal advisory body; however, some argue that this unfairly favors powerful tribes leaving smaller tribes to be ruled by a body that does not represent their interests. This argument states that the constitution should be amended to include an easier and fairer way to divide power among tribes, especially because the current divisions were created with the constitution in 1966.

Jacqueline Solway, Mpho Molomo, and Lydia Nyati-Ramahobo, among other scholars, praise the constitution of Botswana for being extremely progressive for its time in its attempt to have gender and minority equality; however, there are scholars that argue that the Constitution requires significant work in order to be equal and fair.
