= Elections in Botswana =

Elections in Botswana take place within the framework of a multi-party democracy and a parliamentary system. The National Assembly is mostly directly elected, and in turn elects the President and some of its own members. The Ntlo ya Dikgosi is a mixture of appointed, hereditary and indirectly elected members.

The first multi-party elections took place in 1965.

== Electoral history ==
=== Bechuanaland Protectorate ===
Following the creation of the Bechuanaland Protectorate in 1889, the first elections took place in the territory at the start of the 1920s, following the establishment of the European Advisory Council (EAC) and the Native Advisory Council (NAC). Members of the EAC were elected in single-member constituencies by British citizens (or those who could qualify for British citizenship) with European parentage, and who met residency and wealth requirements. It was first elected in 1921, with elections held every three years. Initially it had four members, increasing to six in 1929 and eight in 1948.

The Native Advisory Council initially consisted of 30 members, five from each of the southern tribes (the Rolong, Kwêna, Bangwaketse, Kgatla, Bamalete and the Tlôkwa). One of the five members had to be the tribe's chief, but the other four members were elected by the tribes "according to their customs". However, this system was criticised by some members, including SM Molema, who claimed that chiefs were picking their favourites. The Resident Commissioner noted that his understanding was that members would be elected in kgotlas (traditional assemblies). In 1937 the system was changed to allow the Resident Commissioner to select one representative for each tribe. In 1940 it was renamed the African Advisory Council (AAC) and in 1944 its membership was changed to reflect the population of the tribes. The AAC was enlarged to 35 members, with eight from the Bangwato, four from the Bangwaketse and Kwêna, three from the Rolong, the Bamalete, Tlôkwa, Kgatla and the Tawana, two from the Kgalagadi and two representing the Francistown area.

In 1950 a Joint Advisory Council was created, with eight representatives from each of the EAC and the AAC and three nominated members. Towards the end of the 1950s, pressures to create a Legislative Council eventually led to a proclamation in December 1960 that the EAC and AAC would be dissolved in April 1961, and two new bodies, a Legislative Council and African Council, would be elected. The new Legislative Council had eleven directly elected members, ten of which were elected by Europeans and one by the Asian population. There were also ten indirectly elected African members, who were chosen by the African Council, as well as ten colonial officials and some co-opted members. The African Council was partly elected, with elected members sitting alongside the leaders of the eight chiefdoms.

=== Republic of Botswana ===
The first elections held under universal suffrage took place in 1965, prior to independence 18 months later. The Bechuanaland Democratic Party (renamed the Botswana Democratic Party following independence) won a landslide victory, taking 28 of the 31 seats. Following independence, the BDP went on to claim landslide victories in 1969, 1974, 1979 and 1984, winning at least three-quarters of the seats in every election. A referendum on electoral reform was held in 1987, but it only involved the creation of the post of Supervisor of Elections, and the first-past-the-post system that allowed the BDP to dominate the National Assembly remained in place. After another landslide victory in 1989, the 1994 elections saw the best performance by an opposition party, as the Botswana National Front (BNF) won 13 of the 40 elected seats, although the BDP still held two-thirds of the seats. A second electoral reform referendum was held in 1997 following violent protests in 1995. The reforms included the creation of an Independent Electoral Commission, allowing Batswana living abroad to vote, and lowering the vote age from 21 to 18, with all three approved by voters.

The 1999 elections saw the BDP win 33 of the 40 elected seats, following a split in the BNF in 1998. It went on to win 44 of the 57 elected seats in 2004, 45 seats in 2009 and 37 seats in 2014.

== Electoral system ==
=== National Assembly ===
The 69 members of the National Assembly include 61 members elected for five-year terms in single member constituencies using first-past-the-post voting, six members elected by the National Assembly from a list provided by the President, and two ex officio members; the President and the Attorney General. Since independence, the size of the National Assembly has gradually been increased; with the number of elected members increasing from 31 to 32 in 1974, 34 in 1984, 40 in 1994, 57 in 2004 and 61 in 2024. The presence of indirectly elected members began in 1974.

Voters must be Batswana citizens aged 18 or over, have continuously resided in the country for at least 12 months prior to voter registration. Reasons for disqualification include being declared insane, being under a death sentence, having been imprisoned for six months or more, having committed an offence related to elections, or having dual citizenship. Candidates must be at least 21, be sufficiently proficient in English to take part in parliamentary proceedings and must not have an undischarged bankruptcy. They must also obtain a nomination from at least two voters in their constituency and the support of seven. A deposit is required, which is refunded if the candidate receives at least 5% of the vote in the constituency. Members of the Ntlo ya Dikgosi cannot stand for election to the National Assembly.

=== President ===
Candidates for the National Assembly state on the ballot paper which candidate they support for President, and the President is subsequently elected by members of the National Assembly following general elections. Candidates must be nominated by at least 1,000 voters, and be at least 30 years old. Until 1974 the President had to be an elected MP.

=== Ntlo ya Dikgosi ===
The Ntlo ya Dikgosi (House of Chiefs) is indirectly elected. Until 2005 it consisted of the eight chiefs of the country's main tribes, four members elected from amongst themselves by chiefs of other tribes, and three further members elected by the 12 existing members. In 2005 it was expanded to consist of 35 members, comprising the eight chiefs, five members appointed by the President, and 22 members elected by regional electoral colleges from paid tribal chiefs every five years.

== Referendums ==
Three national referendums have been held in Botswana. The first was held in 1987 on reforms to the electoral system, with a second referendum on the same subject in 1997. The third referendum was held in 2001 on proposed reforms to the judicial system. Voters were asked a total of eight questions, and voter turnout was just 4.9%.
