= List of rulers of Ngwaketse =

The following is a list of rulers of baNgwaketse, a territory located in present-day Botswana.

Kgôsikgolo = King

(Dates in italics indicate de facto continuation of office)

Tenure	Incumbent	Notes
1750 to 1770	Mongala a Makaba, Kgôsikgolo	
1770 to 1790	Moleta a Mongala, Kgôsikgolo	
1790 to 1817	Makaba II a Moleta Rramaomana, Kgôsikgolo	
Division into two segments (1817-1857)
1817 to 1824	Makaba II a Moleta Rramaomana, Kgôsikgolo	
1824 to 1844	Sebêgô a Makaba, acting Kgôsikgolo	
1844 to 1857	Senthufe a Sebêgô, Kgôsikgolo	
1817 to 1822	Tshosaa Makaba, Kgôsikgolo	
1822 to 1845	Segotshane a Makaba, acting Kgôsikgolo	
1845 to 1857	Gaseitsiwe a Tshosa, Kgôsikgolo	Becoming Paramount Chief of re-united baNgwaketse
Reunification
1857 to July 1889	Gaseitsiwe a Tshosa, Kgôsikgolo	
1889 to 1 July 1910	Bathoen I a Gaseitsiwe, Kgôsikgolo	
1910 to 1916	Seêpapitsô III a Bathoen, Kgôsikgolo	
1916 to 1918	Kgosimotse a Gaseitsiwe, acting Kgôsikgolo	
1918 to 1919	Malope a Makaba, acting Kgôsikgolo	
1919 to 1923	Tshosa Sebêgô a Keemanao, acting Kgôsikgolo	
1923 to 1924	Gagoangwe a Setshele, acting Kgôsikgolo	♀
1924 to 1928	Ntebogang a Bathoen, acting Kgôsikgolo	♀
1928 to 1 July 1969	Bathoen II a Seêpapitsô, Kgôsikgolo (Bathoen Seepapitso Gaseitsiwe)	Abdicated
1969 to 1973	Seêpapitsô IV a Bathoen, Kgôsikgolo (Seepapitso Bathoen Gaseitsiwe)	1st Term
1973 to 19??	Mookgami a Seêpapitsô, acting Kgôsikgolo (Mookgami Gaseitsiwe)	
19?? to 2010	Seêpapitsô IV a Bathoen, Kgôsikgolo (Seepapitso Bathoen Gaseitsiwe)	2nd Term
October 2011 to present	Malope II a Seêpapitsô, Kgôsikgolo (Malope Seepapitso Gaseitsiwe)	

== Sources ==
- http://www.rulers.org/botstrad.html

== See also ==
- Botswana
  - Heads of state of Botswana
  - Heads of government of Botswana
  - Colonial heads of Botswana (Bechuanaland)
    - Rulers of baKgatla
    - Rulers of baKwêna
    - Rulers of Balete (baMalete)
    - Rulers of Bangwato (bamaNgwato)
    - Rulers of baRôlông
    - Rulers of baTawana
    - Rulers of baTlôkwa
