= Seepapitso III =

Ngwaketse chief (1884–1916)

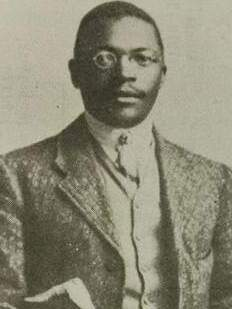
- Seepapitso in 1915

Kgosi of the Bangwaketse
- Reign: 1910–1916
- Predecessor: Bathoen I
- Successor: Bathoen II; Kgosimotse (regent)
- Born: Seepapitso Bathoen Gaseitsiwe; 25 December 1884
- Died: 18 June 1916 (aged 31–32)
- Issue: Bathoen II; Mookami
- Father: Bathoen I

Seepapitso III Bathoen Gaseitsiwe (Note: Sometimes rendered as Seepapitso I or Seepapitso II) (1884–1916) was the chief, or kgosi, of the Bangwaketse in the Bechuanaland Protectorate (present-day Botswana) from 1910 until his assassination in 1916. Becoming kgosi upon the death of his father, Bathoen I. Seepapitso implemented legal and economic reforms and began several development projects, giving him a reputation as a moderniser. He created a more bureaucratic system of government to facilitate his reforms, and he became known for his detailed record keeping of meetings and trials. Seepapitso implemented several levies to fund his projects and was strict with enforcement of the law, causing discontent with some of the tribe's headmen. He had a strained relationship with his brother, Moepitso, which culminated in Moepitso shooting and killing Seepapitso. Seepapitso was succeeded by a series of regents until his son Bathoen II came of age.

== Early life and family ==
Seepapitso Bathoen Gaseitsiwe was born in 1884 to Bathoen I, the kgosi, or head, of the southern African Bangwaketse tribe, and Gagoangwe, the daughter of Bakwena kgosi Sechele I. His sister Ntebogang Ratshosa was born in 1882, and his brother Moepitso was born c. 1887. He also had two older half-siblings on his mother's side: a half-brother Baitirile and a half-sister Maserame, children of kgosi Pilane of the Bakgatla.

Seepapitso began his tutoring under the missionary Mothowagae Motlogelwa of the London Missionary Society. He then attended school at the Lovedale Missionary Institute until 1903. After leaving Lovedale, he worked under his father for the following seven years as he was trained to be the next kgosi. In the final months of his father's reign, Seepapitso began taking notes on the proceedings of the tribe's formal meetings, the kgotla. He attended the church of the London Missionary Society each Sunday, where he played the organ.

== Kgosi of the Bangwaketse ==
Seepapitso became kgosi upon his father's death on 1 July 1910. His relationship with his brother Moepitso soured, largely because Moepitso felt he was entitled to more of the family's estate. The brothers came into further conflict in 1913 when Seepapitso discouraged Moepitso from marrying a certain woman, which allegedly caused Moepitso to threaten Seepapitso with a gun.

Upon taking his position, Seepapitso was the most educated of the dikgosi, or chiefs, and he remained among the most well educated among all tribal leaders in southern Africa in the early 20th century. He could fluently speak and read English, allowing him to engage efficiently with the British colonial government of the Bechuanaland Protectorate where the Bangwaketse were located. He was willing to work with the colonial government, which held him in high regard. During World War I, Seepapitso oversaw regiments under South African General Dan Pienaar. On 1 January 1915, his regiments captured pro-German Boers in Segwagwa. This earned him a strong reputation with the colonial government.

Seepapitso was a Congregationalist Christian, and believed there should be only one religious institution for the Bangwaketse. When he became kgosi, he faced a religious dispute between the London Missionary Society and the Ngwaketse free school that split from it, led by Mothowagae Motlogelwa. Seepapitso's father Bathoen had ordered Mothowagae's banishment, worried that he may attempt to organise a coup to put Bathoen's brother in charge. Seepapitso ordered that the banishment be carried out.

Fearing encroachment from surrounding tribes, Seepapitso enforced boundaries for the Bangwaketse. He sent several wards to settle in areas around the outer edges of the tribe's territory, beginning with Mahubaakgama in 1913, followed by dispatches to Dagawana, Gathwane, Khakhea, and Kokong in 1915. He was one of several dikgosi to protest the proposal to assimilate the Bechuanaland Protectorate into the Union of South Africa, which had previously been a major issue during his father's reign.

=== Reforms and development projects ===
Seepapitso is described as a moderniser and a progressive, and he implemented a number of developments for the Bangwaketse. He believed that European technology could work alongside tribal law and traditions to bring prosperity to the Batswana. Seepapitso mobilised mephato age regiments for a variety of infrastructure projects. He oversaw the construction of the Makgodumo dam in 1913, and through his efforts to sink boreholes, Kanye became the first village with standpipes in the protectorate. In addition to infrastructure, he introduced the protectorate's first resident medical practitioner. Seepapitso also pushed for educational reforms. This included constructing new schools in Macheng and Manyana, hiring more qualified teachers, increasing the school levy, encouraging parents to send their children to school, creating academic prizes, and introducing sports competitions.

With his secretary, Peter Kgasa, Seepapitso created a bureaucracy to govern the Bangwaketse, and he had detailed records made to track government proceedings. He was the first Motswana kgosi to keep minutes at kgotla meetings, and he personally recorded the happenings of court cases he oversaw. Seepapitso kept his kgotla records and his judicial records separated. He hired the trader Richard Montshiwa Rowland to organise his development projects and implement economic reforms. Seepapitso's collection of funds sometimes frustrated the tribe's headmen. He personally managed an account with the Standard Bank on behalf of the Bangwaketse.

=== Legal responsibilities ===
Seepapitso created a single list of the Banagwaketse's 621 laws in 1913 and read them for the tribe. This included his own laws as well as those of his predecessors Bathoen I and Gaseitsiwe, revitalising some laws that had not been enforced. Before implementing new laws, he discussed them with other Bangwaketse to determine whether action should be taken on an issue and then raised it at an assembly to solicit feedback. When ruling on court cases, Seepapitso determined that failure to appear was an admission of guilt. He imposed restrictions on divorce and mandated that divorces be addressed at the kgotla where he presided. He also required that the person who caused the divorce must compensate the other. Seepapitso decried women of the tribe becoming concubines for Europeans but is not known to have taken legal action in response.

As kgosi, Seepapitso introduced several laws. He oversaw the development and regulation of roads as oxen-pulled wagons became more common. He required that they have brakes before descending the hill from Kanye in 1910, that they must have someone leading them when they travel through towns in 1911, and that they not be allowed on main roads. He created several new levies, and in 1911 he determined that citizens who could not pay taxes would "be sent away to work". In 1912, Seepapitso ordered that a specific brand must be applied to livestock that are to be sold outside of the tribe. The same year, he set fixed rates for transportation of goods by wagon and for the sale of firewood to Europeans. Seepapitso mandated that a permit was required to sell cattle in 1913. Also in 1913, he mandated the dowry practice of bogadi. Seepapitso attempted to enforce his father's ban on kgadi beer but found this to be a challenge.

Seepapitso grew frustrated with his headmen who he felt were not doing enough to enforce the law. When a headman did not collect enough money in taxes and levies, Seepapitso would relieve him from his position. In one instance in 1913, he personally went into someone's hut to catch them with illegal alcohol. Seepapitso's actions were challenged during the trial, but he said that he had to do it himself because the headmen refused to do their jobs.

== Assassination ==
On 18 June 1916, Seepapitso was shot and killed by his brother Moepitso at a kgotla meeting. The two had been in a heated argument that morning, after Moepitso asked for money to which he felt entitled. During their argument, Moepitso allegedly said what has been interpreted as a death threat: "I have always been speaking to you and now I will see what I will do".

When the kgotla meeting began that evening, Moepitso and one other tribal leader in attendance spurned Seepapitso by leaving while he was speaking. Approximately five minutes later, Moepitso shot Seepapitso. The kgosi is reported as saying Moepitso a mpolaela eng? (transl. Moepitso, why are you killing me?) before turning to see who the shooter was. The headmen did not know what had happened, and Moepitso joined them in carrying Seepapitso to his home, where the kgosi died soon after. Moepitso was a suspect, especially as he showed no emotion beyond slight nervousness. The wife of Seepapitso's servant accused Moepitso of the killing. He was arrested when his glasses were found with the murder weapon. Moepitso was hanged for the killing, which their mother endorsed.

It is unknown why Moepitso killed Seepapitso. He had a reputation for being erratic and violent, and he had allegedly made multiple threats against Seepapitso's life in the past. Moepitso's displeasure with the allocation of his father's inheritance may have been a factor, or he may have been jealous of his brother's broader success in life. He is also said to have wanted the position of kgosi for himself. Some historians, such as Yonah Matemba, propose that Moepitso killed Seepapitso at the behest of Bangwaketse tribal leaders who felt threatened by the kgosi and his modernisation reforms. Several headmen were deemed complicit in the killing and exiled.

== Legacy and succession ==
Seepapitso's death was felt widely through the Bangwaketse and through oral tradition became a shared cultural tragedy. The year 1916 is traditionally associated with the killing. The academic Yonah Hisbon Matemba has credited Seepapitso as the greatest kgosi of the Bangwaketse in the colonial period. Seepapitso's detailed record keeping has allowed historians to study the Batswana in a time period from which not many surviving records exist.

Seepapitso had two sons: Bathoen II and Mookami. Bathoen II was Seepapitso's heir, but as he was only eight years old at the time of his father's death, Seepapitso was succeeded by a series of regents: Kgosimotse, Malope, and Tshosa Sebego. Seepapitso's reforms, already declining amid the instability of successive regencies, degraded under Tshosa's rule. As dissatisfaction grew, Seepapitso's mother Gagoangwe and then his sister Ntebogang took charge of the tribe. Ntebogang continued many of Seepapitso's development and modernisation projects. Bathoen II became kgosi with the end of the regency on 13 April 1928, and during his reign he revitalised many of Seepapitso's projects and reforms.

== Bibliography ==
- Massey, David (1978). "A Case of Colonial Collaboration: The Hut Tax and Migrant Labour". Botswana Notes and Records. 10: 95–98. ISSN 0525-5090.
- Matemba, Yonah Hibson (2002). "The Assassination of Kgosi Seepapitso Gaseitsiwe of the BaNgwaketse 1916–17". Botswana Notes & Records. 34 (1): 25–36.
- Molefi, R.; Morton, F.; Ngcongco, L. (1987). "The Modernists: Seepapitso, Ntebogang and Isang". In Morton, Fred; Ramsay, Jeff (eds.). The Birth of Botswana: A History of the Bechuanaland Protectorate from 1910 to 1966. Longman Botswana. pp. 11–29. ISBN 978-0-582-00584-6.
- Morton, Barry; Ramsay, Jeff (2018). Historical Dictionary of Botswana (5th ed.). Rowman & Littlefield. ISBN 978-1-5381-1133-8.
- Roberts, Simon (1991). "Tswana Government and Law in the Time of Seepapitso, 1910–1916". In Mann, Kristin; Roberts, Richard L. (eds.). Law in Colonial Africa. Heinemann Educational Books. pp. 164–184. ISBN 978-0-85255-602-3.
- Schapera, I. (1942). "A Short History of the Bangwaketse". African Studies. 1 (1): 1–26. doi:10.1080/00020184208706566. ISSN 0002-0184.
- Schapera, Isaac (1963) [1956]. Government and Politics in Tribal Societies. C. A. Watts.
- Schapera, I. (1977). "Contempt of Court in Tswana Law". Journal of African Law. 21 (2): 139–152. doi:10.1017/S0021855300008640. ISSN 0021-8553.
- Schapera, I. (1987). "Early European Influences on Tswana Law". Journal of African Law. 31 (1–2): 151–160. doi:10.1017/S002185530000930X. ISSN 0021-8553.
- Williamson, David (1977). Burke's Royal Families of the World. Vol. II: Africa & the Middle East. Burke's Peerage. ISBN 978-0-85011-029-6.
