= List of chairpersons of the Ntlo ya Dikgosi =

This is a list of chairpersons (speakers) of the Ntlo ya Dikgosi, an advisory body to the government of Botswana

Name	Entered office	Left office
Kgosi Katholo P. Ramokate	1966	1968
Kgosi Leapeetswe P. Khama	1969	1969
Kgosi Seepapitso IV	1970	1973
Kgosi Letsholathebe	1974	1976
Kgosi Seepapitso IV	1977	1989
Kgosi Monare Gaborone	1990	1990
Kgosi Seepapitso IV	1991	1993
Kgosi Katholo P. Ramokate	1994	1994
Kgosi Sediegeng H. Kgmane	1995	1995
Kgosi Seepapitso IV	1996	1998
Kgosi Tawana II	1999	2002
Kgosi Mosadi Seboko	2003	2003
Kgosi Orabile N. Kalaben	2004	2004
Kgosi Seepapitso IV	2005	2008
Kgosi Puso Gaborone	January 18, 2009	2024
Kgosi Malope II	2024	Present

== Sources ==
- Official website of the Parliament of Botswana
