= Makaba I =

18th-century Ngwaketse chief

Kgosi of the Bangwaketse
- Predecessor: Khutwane (acting)
- Successor: Mongala
- Issue: Mongala
- Father: Khutwane

Makaba I was the leader of the Bangwaketse in the 18th century. The exact nature of his reign is unknown, but he is traditionally understood to have had a disputed reign with his cousin Modutlwa. He led his faction to Seoke and was succeeded by his son Mongala, who became kgosi.

== Life ==
Makaba was born to Khutwane, who acted as the effective leader of the Bangwaketse. According to tradition, Khutwane seized power over his brother Khuto following the death of their father Leema. When Khutwane died, Makaba was a claimant to the leadership position against Modutlwa, the son of Khuto. Makaba took his faction of the tribe to Seoke. After settling in Seoke, Makaba discovered the Bakgwatlheng, who would later be subjugated by his son Mongala and destroyed by Mongala's son Moleta.

== Succession and legacy ==
Upon Makaba's death, he was succeeded by his son Mongala. Mongala consolidated power and became kgosi, affirming Makaba's lineage as the leaders of the tribe. The Bakwena provide an alternate understanding of Makaba's rule, suggesting that the Bangwaketse were still part of the Bakwena until the rule of Mongala or his son Moleta. The approximate time of the split indicates that Makaba may also have been the leader of the Bangwaketse at the time they split from the Bakwena.
