= Makaba II =

Ngwaketse chief (c. 1790–1824)

Kgosi of the Bangwaketse
- Reign: c. 1790–1824
- Predecessor: Moleta
- Successor: Gaseitsiwe
- Born: c. 1760
- Died: 1824
- Issue: Tshosa; Segotshane; Sebego
- Father: Moleta

Makaba II (c. 1760 – 1824) was the kgosi of the Bangwaketse from c. 1790 until his death in 1824. Succeeding his father Moleta, Makaba's cattle raids against other tribes made the Bangwaketse the strongest tribe among its neighbours. He was killed during a raid by the Bakololo and succeeded by his grandson Gaseitsiwe.

== Kgosi of the Bangwaketse ==
Makaba was born c. 1760 to Moleta, kgosi of the Bangwaketse. He succeeded his father c. 1790. Makaba was frequently in conflict with other tribes in the region. He launched numerous cattle raids against neighbouring tribes, particularly the Bakwena, the Barolong, and the Batlhaping. He also targeted the Mmanaana Kgatla, over which he seized control from 1820 to 1824. These raids allowed the Bangwaketse to become the strongest tribe in the surrounding areas. Makaba used the tribe's cattle wealth to encourage immigration to its territory.

Makaba had three children. By one wife he had Tshosa and Segotshane, and by another he had Sebego. When the Difaqane conflicts began in the 1820s, Makaba's control over the Bangaketse slipped as his sons worked with the Bakwena to undermine him. Tshosa openly rebelled against his father in 1823 and was killed. Segotshane, also a member of this rebellion, fled to the Barolong following their defeat. Makaba welcomed Robert Moffat of the London Missionary Society to Kgwakgwe in July or August 1824.

== Death and succession ==
Makaba was killed in 1824 while fighting against a Bakololo invasion from the south. It has been suggested that Sebego played a role in his father's death. As Makaba's heir Tshosa predeceased him, Makaba was succeeded by Tshosa's son, Gaseitsiwe. Sebego and Segotshane both served as regents for Gaseitsiwe. Makaba's death began a period of strife among the Bangwaketse.
