= Ntlo ya Dikgosi =

Botswana parliamentary advisory body

The Ntlo ya Dikgosi (Tswana for "House of Chiefs") in Botswana is an advisory body to the country's parliament.

== Composition ==
The house consists of 35 members. Eight members are hereditary chiefs (kgosi) from Botswana's principal tribes (BaKgatla, BaKwêna, BaMalete, BamaNgwato, BaNgwaketse, BaRôlông, BaTawana, and BaTlôkwa). 20 members are indirectly elected and serve five-year terms. Two are chosen from the districts of North-East and Chobe. The remaining 5 members are appointed by the country's president. They must be at least 21 years of age, proficient in the English language, and have not participated in active politics in the past five years. Chiefs may not belong to political parties.

== Powers ==
The house acts as a purely advisory body to the Parliament and has no legislative nor veto power. All bills affecting tribal organization and property, customary law, and the administration of customary courts go through the house before being discussed in the National Assembly. Members must also be consulted when the constitution is being reviewed or amended. The body has the power to summon members of government to appear before it.

== See also ==
- National Assembly of Botswana
- History of Botswana
- Kgosi
- List of Chairpersons of the Ntlo ya Dikgosi
- Senate of Lesotho
- National House of Traditional Leaders of South Africa
- Council of Traditional Leaders of Namibia
