= Puso Gaborone =

Kgosi of the Tlôkwa (r. 2007–present)

Kgosi of the Tlôkwa
- Reign: August 2007 – present
- Predecessor: Moshibidu Gaborone
- Born: 11 November 1975 (age 49)

Puso Gaborone (born 11 November 1975) is the kgosi of the Tlôkwa tribe of Tlokweng in Botswana. As of 2021, he serves as the elected chairperson of Botswana's Ntlo ya Dikgosi (House of Chiefs), a position he has held since 2009.

== Background and education ==
Born in November 1975, he is the only son of the late kgosi Moshibidu Gaborone and grandson of Kgosi Gaborone. Kgosi was educated at Batlokwa National School. Prior to him being a chief he was a teacher. His coronation was held at the Tlokweng Kgotla in a ceremony attended by the Former Presidents of Botswana, Festus Mogae and Quett Masire, Tlôkwa chiefs from South Africa and Lesotho, community leaders and members of the community as a whole.

== Tlôkwa throne ==
Puso Gaborone ascended the Tlôkwa throne in August 2007 after his father died in 2005. In his capacity as the kgosi of the Tlôkwa, he has been elected and re-elected as the chairperson of Botswana's Ntlo ya Dikgosi (House of Chiefs).

== Personal life ==
Kgosi Puso Gaborone married Thandi Tshepo Leshomo Gaborone in August 2016 and the couple has one child. It was also reported that he "had led by example" by taking the COVID-19 vaccine with his wife in March 2021.

== See also ==
- List of rulers of Tlôkwa
- Ntlo ya Dikgosi
