= Gaseitsiwe =

Ngwaketse chief (c. 1820–1889)

Kgosi of the Bangwaketse
- Reign: c. 1824 – 1889 (de jure); c. 1853 – 1889 (de facto)
- Predecessor: Makaba II
- Successor: Bathoen I
- Regent: Sebego; Segotshane
- Born: c. 1820
- Died: 1889
- Issue: Bathoen I; Gasekete; Kgosimotse
- Father: Tshosa

Gaseitsiwe (c. 1820–1889) was the kgosi of the Bangwaketse in present-day Botswana from c. 1824 to 1889. He succeeded his grandfather, Makaba II. The early years of his reign were under the regency of Gaseitsiwe's uncle Sebego, who seized power forcefully. Gaseitsiwe formally took power in 1853. He ruled until his death and was succeeded by his son Bathoen I.

== Early life and exile ==
Gaseitsiwe was born c. 1820 as the son of Tshosa Makaba II. Tshosa was the son and heir of Makaba II, the kgosi of the Bangwaketse. Tshosa was killed in a rebellion against Makaba c. 1823.

Gaseitsiwe became kgosi upon Makaba's death c. 1824, but Tshosa's younger brother Sebego seized power and became regent. The Bangwaketse split c. 1830, with one side controlled by Sebego and the other controlled by Tshosa's other brother Segotshane. Gaseitsiwe was a member of Segotshane's alliance against Sebego. Sebego poisoned Gaseitsiwe's brother in the 1830s and attempted to poison Gaseitsiwe, so he fled with his mother to live with the Barolong. Gaseitsiwe returned from exile c. 1844 to repel Sebego.

== Kgosi of the Bangwaketse ==
Gaseitsiwe took control over the Bangwaketse following the Batswana–Boer War of 1852–1853. He reunited the tribe in June 1853 alongside Sebego's son Senthufe. He then exiled Senthufe and consolidated power in 1857.

Gaseitsiwe gained access to the trans-Kalahari trade route and led a westward expansion of the Bangwaketse in the 1860s. He formed an alliance with Sechele I in the 1870s and defined the boundaries between their respective territories.

The Mmanaana Kgatla moved to Mosopa in the late 19th century while fighting the Bakwena and came under the authority of the Bangwaketse. Gaseitsiwe tried to seize control over the Kgatla people's allies, the Balete, in 1881 but was soundly defeated in battle. The Bangwaketse's attack on Balete cattle in South African Republic angered the nation, and they captured Gaseitsiwe before ransoming him. This marked a transfer of power away from Gaseitsiwe toward his son, Bathoen I.

Gaseitsiwe offered support to the Barolong in the Batswana–Boer War of 1881–1884, where they fought the Goshenites. He was kgosi when the Bechuanaland Protectorate was declared by the United Kingdom, and he invited the Bechuanaland Expedition that declared the protectorate into Kanye.

Gaseitsiwe was taught to read by Sebobi, an evangelist with the London Missionary Society, but he did not convert to Christianity. He was tolerant of the organisation, mobilising age regiments to help it construct a church. Religious disagreements between Christians and adherents of traditional religion became a major issue toward the end of Gaseitsiwe's reign in the 1870s and 1880s.

== Death and succession ==
Gaseitsiwe died in 1889. He had three children. By one wife he had Bathoen I, and by another he had Gasekete and Kgosimotse. Gaseitsiwe was succeeded by Bathoen.
