= Malope II =

Ngwaketse chief

Kgosi of the Bangwaketse
- Reign: 7 October 2011–present
- Predecessor: Seepapitso IV
- Father: Seepapitso IV

Malope II is the incumbent kgosi, or chief, of the Bangwaketse. He became kgosi on 7 October 2011, succeeding his father Seepapitso IV. Malope married Maseitsebi Motlomelo in 2022.
