= Mosadi Seboko =

Motswana traditional ruler

Mosadi Muriel Seboko

Kgosikgolo of the Balete
- Reign: 7 January 2002 – present
- Predecessor: Tumelo Seboko
- Born: 7 June 1950 (age 75); Ramotswa, Botswana
- Issue: 4 daughters
- Alma mater: Moeding College

12th Chairperson of the Ntlo ya Dikgosi
- In office 28 February 2002 – 28 January 2004
- Preceded by: Tawana II
- Succeeded by: Orabile N. Kalaben

Mosadi Seboko (born 7 June 1950) is a Motswana traditional ruler who is kgosikgolo of the Balete people since 2002. She is the first female kgosikgolo in the history of Botswana.

== Early life ==
Because of the patriarchal system practised in Botswana, culturally, people believe a woman cannot lead the tribe as a Paramount Chief. However the Constitution of Botswana does not discriminate against women due to their sex. My understanding of the Bill of Rights in the Constitution suggests that actually we have equal rights as men and women, to such positions.

— Mosadi Seboko on why she wanted to be the first female kgosikgolo in Botswana

Mosadi Seboko was born on 7 June 1950 in Ramotswa, 30 kilometres (19 mi) south of Gaborone. Her name Mosadi literally means "woman" in Setswana, and she was given the English name "Muriel". Her father, Mokgosi III, expected a boy to be his oldest child, but upon seeing his daughter, he said, "Well, it's a woman. What can I do? It's my child." In 1969, she graduated from Moeding College. Two years later, she became the department administrator at Barclay's Bank. She ended her six-year marriage with her abusive husband in 1978.

== Chieftainship ==
Mosadi Seboko's brother was kgosikgolo from 1 June 1996 to 17 June 2001 when he died from an illness. Tumelo Seboko, an uncle of Mosadi, became acting kgosikgolo from 21 June 2001 to 7 January 2002. Mosadi's mother and sisters pushed her to become the next kgosikgolo during this time, which would break a history of solely male dikgosikgolo. (Note: The plural of kgosikgolo is dikgosikgolo.) At the time of the installation, she worked as a floor manager at Century Office Supplies in Broadhurst. Mosadi based her claim for bogosi (Note: "the office of chieftainship" in Setswana) on the "birthright equity"; since she was the first born, she should have precedence in becoming kgosikgolo.

Seboko had many critics because she was a woman. Her uncle Tumelo wanted Tsimane Mokgosi, a cousin of Mosadi, to become kgosikgolo instead, and other members of the kgotla tried to delay her installation by saying that she did not have the skills to lead the traditional leopard hunt or to engage in the "rainmaking" ritual, both of which were necessary to prove a kgosikgolo's legitimacy. Mosadi rebutted the arguments, saying that many of those traditions fell into disuse when Christianity came to Botswana.

Her ascension was revolutionary in that it overthrew a tradition where women were only allowed in the kgotla (village meeting) if they were invited by a male. She assumed office on 7 January 2002 and became chairperson of the Ntlo ya Dikgosi on 28 February 2002. She was crowned on 30 August 2003 and received the traditional gift of cattle, and a Toyota pickup truck, washing machine, vacuum cleaner, computer, and printer. During her coronation, she noted the changing dynamics of her tribe:

You were able to transcend the gender imbalance that many are still grappling with, and installed me not because I am a woman, but rather on the basis of birthright equity.

Her leadership style is unconventional compared to her male predecessors: she openly talks about her abusive husband, sexual rights for women, and the growing HIV/AIDS problem. Critics have accused her of "defending women", but Mosadi Seboko responded that she is instead "angry at women [...] for failing to exert more control over their own circumstances".

== See also ==
- List of rulers of Lete (Malete)

== Citations ==
Preceded by Tumelo Seboko	Kgosikgolo of the Balete; 2002–present	Succeeded by incumbent
