= Sophie =

Given name

- Gender: feminine
- Language: English, French, German, Dutch

Origin
- Derivation: Sophia
- Meaning: Wisdom

Other names
- Alternative spelling: Sophy, Sofie
- Nickname: Soph

Sophie is a feminine given name, from the Greek word for 'wisdom'.

== People with the name ==
=== Born in the Middle Ages ===
- Sophie, Countess of Bar (c. 1004 or 1018–1093), sovereign Countess of Bar and lady of Mousson
- Sophie of Thuringia, Duchess of Brabant (1224–1275), second wife and only Duchess consort of Henry II, Duke of Brabant and Lothier

=== Born in 1600s and 1700s ===
- Sophie of Anhalt-Zerbst (1729–1796), later Empress Catherine II of Russia
- Sophie Amalie of Brunswick-Lüneburg (1628–1685), Queen consort of Denmark-Norway
- Sophie Blanchard (1778–1819), French balloonist
- Sophie Dorothea of Württemberg (1759–1828), second wife of Tsar Paul I of Russia
- Sophie Dawes, Baronne de Feuchères (c. 1795–1840), English baroness
- Sophie Germain (1776–1831), French mathematician
- Sophie Körnerová (1750–1817) Czech stage actress
- Sophie Piper (1757–1816), Swedish countess
- Sophie Schröder (1781–1868), German actress
- Sophie von La Roche (1730–1807), German author
- Princess Sophie of Erbach-Erbach (1725–1795), Princess consort of Nassau-Saarbrücken

=== Born 1790–1918 ===
- Sophie, Duchess of Alencon (1847–1897), wife of Prince Ferdinand, Duke of Alençon
- Sophie, Archduchess of Austria (1855–1857), first child of Franz Joseph I, Emperor of Austria, and Elisabeth of Bavaria
- Sophie of Bavaria (1805–1872), mother of Emperor Franz Joseph I of Austria
- Sophie, Countess of Ségur (1799–1874), Russian-French writer
- Sophie of Sweden (1801–1865), Grand Duchess of Baden
- Sophie von Hatzfeldt (1805–1881), German Worker's Rights Advocate, "The Red Countess"
- Sophie Adelheid, Duchess in Bavaria (1875–1957), German nobility
- Sophie Adlersparre (1823–1895), Swedish women's rights activist
- Sophie Atkinson (1876–1972), English painter
- Sophie Bledsoe Aberle (1896–1996), American anthropologist
- Sophie Braslau (1892–1935), American contralto
- Sophie Burdet (1882–?), French seamstress
- Sophie Chotek (1868–1914), wife of Archduke Franz Ferdinand, also assassinated
- Sophie Daguin (1801–1881), French ballerina
- Sophie Drinker (1888–1967), American musicologist
- Sophie Gengembre Anderson (1823–1903), French-British artist
- Sophie Kerr (1880–1965), American author
- Sophie Ley (1849–1918), German painter
- Sophie Masloff (1917–2014), mayor of Pittsburgh
- Sophie Mannerheim (1863–1928), Finnish nurse
- Sophie Dora Spicer Maude (1854–1937), English writer
- Sophie Pemberton (1869–1950), Canadian painter
- Sophie Rogge-Börner (1878–1955), German writer, feminist and nationalist
- Sophie Rostopchine (1799–1874), French writer
- Sophie Schulz (1905–1975), Austrian politician
- Sophie Scott, Pseudonym of a German inventor
- Sophie Sooäär (1914–1996), Estonian actress
- Sophie Taeuber-Arp (1889–1943), Swiss Painter
- Sophie Tucker (1887–1966), American entertainer
- Sophie Treadwell (1885–1970), American writer

=== Born after 1918 ===
- Sophie, Hereditary Princess of Liechtenstein (born 1967), German member of the House of Wittelsbach by birth
- Sophie, Princess of Prussia (born 1978), wife of Georg Friedrich, Prince of Prussia, head of the House of Hohenzollern
- Sophie, Princess of Windisch-Graetz (born 1959), Austrian member of the House of Habsburg-Lorraine by birth and the Austrian House of Windisch-Graetz by marriage
- Sophie, Duchess of Edinburgh (born 1965), British wife of Prince Edward, Duke of Edinburgh
- Sophie Abelson (born 1986), English actress
- Sophie Adriansen (born 1982), French writer
- Sophie Ainsworth (born 1989), British sailor
- Sophie Alakija (born 1993), Nigerian actress and model
- Sophie Albert (born 1990), Filipino actress and television personality
- Sophie Aldred (born 1962), English actress and television presenter
- Sophie Anderton (born 1977), English model
- Sophie Auconie (born 1963), French politician
- Sophie Auster (born 1987), American actress, singer, and songwriter
- Sophie Austin (born 1984), English actress
- Sophie Baggaley (born 1996), English soccer player
- Sophie Balmary (born 1979), French rower
- Sophie Barjac (born 1957), French actress
- Sophie Barthes (born 1974), French–American filmmaker
- Sophie Beem (born 1999), American singer
- Sophie Bellon (born 1961), French businesswoman
- Sophie Bennett (born 1989), Canadian actress, dancer, director, producer, singer, and project manager
- Sophie Berge (born 1964), French yacht racer
- Sophie Bevan (born 1983), British soprano
- Sophie Bissonnette (born 1956), Canadian filmmaker
- Sophie Black (born 1958), American poet
- Sophie Blackall (born 1970), Australian artist and author
- Sophie Body-Gendrot (1942–2018), French political scientist, criminologist, and sociologist
- Sophie de Boer (born 1990), Dutch racing cyclist
- Sophie Boilley (born 1989), French biathlete
- Sophie Bouillon (born 1984), French journalist
- Sophie Bould (born 1982), English actress
- Sophie Bradley (born 1994), English soccer player
- Sophie Bradley-Auckland (born 1989), English soccer player
- Sophie Bray (born 1990), English field hockey player
- Sophie Brochu (born 1963), Canadian economist and businesswoman
- Sophie Bruehmann (born 1995), German acrobatic gymnast
- Sophie Brunner (born 1995), American basketball player
- Sophie Byrne, Australian filmmaker
- Sophie Cadieux (born 1977), Canadian actress
- Sophie Caldwell (born 1990), American cross-country skier
- Sophie Calle (born 1953), French artist
- Sophie Campbell, American comic artist
- Sophie Carle (born 1964), Luxembourgish actress
- Sophie Carrigill (born 1994), British wheelchair basketball player
- Sophie Casey (born 1991), Australian soccer player
- Sophie Castillo (born 1998/1999), British indie pop singer-songwriter
- Sophie Chatel, Canadian politician
- Sophie Choudry (born 1982), Indian–English actress and singer
- Sophie Clarke (born 1989), American television personality
- Sophie Colquhoun (born 1989), English actress
- Sophie Cookson (born 1990), English actress
- Sophie Crane (born 2002), Canadian rhythmic gymnast
- Sophie Creux (born 1981), French road cyclist
- Sophie Crumb (born 1981), American–French comics artist
- Sophie Dahl (born 1977), English author and fashion model
- Sophie Daneman (born 1968), British soprano
- Sophie Daumier (1934–2003), French actress
- Sophie Delila (born 1983), French singer, songwriter, and record producer
- Sophie Deraspe (born 1973), Canadian filmmaker and producer
- Sophie Divry (born 1979), French writer
- Sophie Ecclestone (born 1999), English cricketer
- Sophie Elgort (born 1986), American photographer
- Sophie Elizéon (born 1970), French civil servant
- Sophie Ellis-Bextor (born 1979), English singer and songwriter
- Sophie Errante (born 1971), French politician
- Sophie Falkiner (born 1973), Australian television presenter
- Sophie Fayad (born 2004), Lebanese soccer player
- Sophie Ferguson (born 1986), Australian tennis player
- Sophie Ferracci (born 1976), French lawyer
- Sophie Fiennes (born 1967), English filmmaker
- Sophie Fillières (1964–2023), French filmmaker
- Sophie Fisher (born 1998), New Zealand rugby union player
- Sophie Flack (born 1983), American author and journalist
- Sophie Francis (born 1998), Dutch musician, disk jockey, and record producer
- Sophie Freud (1924–2022), Austrian–American author, educator, and psychologist
- Sophie Galibert, French filmmaker
- Sophie Garbin (born 1997), Australian netball player
- Sophie Garénaux (born 1990/91), French beauty queen and model
- Sophie Gendron, Canadian actress
- Sophie Georges (born 1977), French tennis player
- Sophie Godfrey (born 1987), Australian volleyball player
- Sophie Goyette, Canadian filmmaker
- Sophie Gradon (1985–2018), English model and marketing manager
- Sophie Green (born 1992), English artist
- Sophie Grégoire Trudeau (born 1975), Canadian television host, wife of Justin Trudeau
- Sophie Grigson (born 1959), British cookery writer
- Sophie Guillemin (born 1977), French actress
- Sophie Gurney (1919–2011), English artist
- Sophie Gustafson (born 1973), Swedish golfer
- Sophie Hackett (born 1971), Canadian curator
- Sophie Hahn (born 1997), English Paralympic athlete
- Sophie Hannah (born 1971), British writer
- Sophie Harding (born 1999), Australian soccer player
- Sophie Hausmann (born 1997), German golfer
- Sophie B. Hawkins (born 1964), American singer and songwriter
- Sophie Hecquet (1944–2012), French actress and singer
- Sophie Hediger (1998–2024), Swiss snowboarder
- Sophie Hensser, Australian actress
- Sophie Hermans (born 1981), Dutch politician
- Sophie Hilbrand (born 1975), Dutch actress and television presenter
- Sophie Hirst (born 2000), American soccer player
- Sophie Hitchon (born 1991), English hammer thrower
- Sophie Hopkins (born 1990), Singaporean–born English actress
- Sophie Howe (born 1977), Welsh politician
- Sophie Huet (1953–2017), French journalist
- Sophie Hughes (born 1986), English literary translator
- Sophie Hunger (born 1983), Swiss composer, singer, and songwriter
- Sophie Hunter (born 1978), English playwright and theatre director
- Sophie Hyde (born 1977), Australian filmmaker and producer
- Sophie Jackson (born 1996), Scottish curler
- Sophie Jamal (born 1966), Canadian endocrinologist
- Sophie Jaques (born 2000), Canadian ice hockey player
- Sophie Jelley (born 1972), English Anglican bishop
- Sophie Jodoin (born 1965), Canadian visual artist
- Sophie Joissains (born 1969), French politician
- Sophie Kamlish (born 1996), English Paralympic athlete
- Sophie Kamoun (born 1967), French swimmer
- Sophie Karmasin (born 1967), Austrian politician
- Sophie Kasaei, English television personality
- Sophie Katinis (born 1979), Australian actress
- Sophie Katsarava (born 1976), Georgian politician
- Sophie Kauer (born 2001), German–English actress and cellist
- Sophie Kim (born 1983), South Korean entrepreneur
- Sophie Kinsella (1969–2025), British writer
- Sophie Kirana (born 2000), Indonesian beauty queen
- Sophie Kline (1902–1975), American politician
- Sophie Koch (born 1969), French operatic soprano
- Sophie Kumpen (born 1974), Belgian karting driver
- Sophie Labelle (born 1988), Canadian cartoonist and transgender rights activist
- Sophie Lacaze (born 1963), French composer
- Sophie Lawrence (born 1972), English actress and singer
- Sophie Lee (born 1968), Australian actress
- Sophie Khan Levy (born 1989), English actress
- Sophie Li (born 1988), Australian soccer player
- Sophie Lloyd (born 1995), English guitar
- Sophie Lorain (born 1957), Canadian actress, director, and producer
- Sophie Lowe (born 1990), English–born Australian actress, singer, and songwriter
- Sophie Luck (born 1989), Australian actress
- Sophie Marceau (born 1966), French actress
- Sophie McKay (footballer) (born 2006), Australian rules footballer
- Sophie McShera (born 1985), English actress
- Sophie Melville (born 1991), Welsh actress
- Sophie Mirabella (born 1968), Australian lawyer and politician
- Sophie Moleta (born 1969), New Zealand singer, songwriter, and teacher
- Sophie Molineux (born 1998), Australian cricketer
- Sophie Monk (born 1979), English–born Australian actress, model, singer, and television personality
- Sophie Muller (born 1962), English music video director
- Sophie Nazemi, British political aide
- Sophie Nélisse (born 2000), Canadian actress
- Sophie Nyweide (2000–2025), American actress
- Sophie Okonedo (born 1968), English actress
- Sophie O'Sullivan (born 2001) Irish–Australian athlete
- Sophie Pacini (born 1991), German–Italian pianist
- Sophie Paine (born 1992), Australian volleyball player
- Sophie Panonacle (born 1968), French politician
- Sophie Pantel (born 1971), French politician
- Sophie Papps (born 1994), British sprinter
- Sophie Pascoe (born 1993), New Zealand Paralympic swimmer
- Sophie Pedder (born 1967), English author and journalist
- Sophie Pender (born 1996), English activist and social mobility campaigner
- Sophie Perry (born 1986), Irish soccer player
- Sophie Pétronin (born 1945), French–Swiss humanitarian
- Sophie Podolski (1953–1974), Belgian poet and graphic artist
- Sophie Porley (born 1987), English actress and model
- Sophie Postel-Vinay, French physician and oncology researcher
- Sophie Power (born 1982), British ultrarunner
- Sophie Price (born 1989), British glamour model
- Sophie Primas (born 1962), French engineer and politician
- Sophie Ramdor (born 1992), German politician
- Sophie Raworth (born 1968), British television presenter
- Sophie Reade (born 1989), English model and pornographic actress
- Sophie Reid (born 1997), Australian cricketer
- Sophie Reiser (born 1987), American soccer player
- Sophie Renoir (born 1964), French actress
- Sophie Reynolds (born 1999), American actress
- Sophie Ridge (born 1984), English journalist
- Sophie Rimheden (born 1975), Swedish musician
- Sophie Ristelhueber (born 1949), French photographer
- Sophie Rivera (1938–2021), American artist and photographer
- Sophie Roberts, New Zealand theatre director
- Sophie Rois (born 1961), Austrian actress
- Sophie Rundle (born 1988), English actress
- Sophie Ryder (born 1963), English painter and sculptor
- Sophie Scamps (born 1971), Australian politician
- Sophie Schmidt (born 1988), Canadian soccer player
- Sophie Scholl (1921–1943), German student and political activist
- Sophie Serafino (born 1980), English–Australian composer and violinist
- Sophie Shirley (born 1999), Canadian ice hockey player
- Sophie Simmons (born 1992), model, singer, and television personality
- Sophie Simnett (born 1997), English actress
- Sophie Skelton (born 1994), English actress
- Sophie Solomon (born 1978), British composer, songwriter, and violinist
- Sophie Tassignon (born 1980), Belgian singer and songwriter
- Sophie Thatcher (born 2000), American actress
- Sophie Thompson (born 1962), English actress
- Sophie Toscan du Plantier (1957–1996), French murder victim
- Sophie Turner (born 1996), English actress
- Sophie Vandebroek, Belgian business executive and electrical engineer
- Sophie Vavasseur (born 1992), Irish actress and television presenter
- Sophie Villy (born 1990), Georgian–Ukrainian composer, singer, and songwriter
- Sophie Viney (born 1974), English arranger and composer
- Sophie von Saldern (born 1973), German basketball player
- Sophie Ward (born 1964), English actress
- Sophie Warmuth (born 2002), German speed skater
- Sophie Wilde (born 1998), Australian actress
- Sophie Willan (born 1987), British comedian
- Sophie Williams (born 1991), British Olympic fencer
- Sophie Wilson (born 1957), British computer scientist
- Sophie Winkleman (born 1980), English actress
- Sophie Wotschke (born 1998), Austrian politician
- Sophie Xeon (1986–2021), British music producer and DJ
- Sophie Zelmani (born 1972), Swedish singer and songwriter

== Fictional characters ==
- Sophie Amundsen, main character of the novel Sophie's World
- Sophie Bennett, from the film Rise of the Guardians
- Sophie Bergmann, from the video game Fullmetal Alchemist 3: Kami o Tsugu Shōjo
- Sophie Burton, from the television series Hollyoaks
- Sophie Chapman, from the television series Peep Show
- Sophie Charalambos, from the television series Stath Lets Flats
- Sophie Collins, from the book series The Infernal Devices
- Sophie Devereaux, grifter in the television series Leverage
- Sophie Dumond, from the film Joker (2019 film)
- Sophie Elizabeth Foster, main character of Keeper of the Lost Cities by Shannon Messenger
- Sophie de Réan, main character of the children's book Sophie's Misfortunes
- Sophie von Faninal, from the opera Der Rosenkavalier
- Sofie Fatale, from the film Kill Bill: Volume 1
- Sophie Green, from the sixth season of the television series American Horror Story
- Sophie Hatter, main character of Howl's Moving Castle
- Sophie Jones (disambiguation) § Fictional characters
- Sophie Kachinsky, from the television series 2 Broke Girls
- Sophie King, from the film Cyberbully
- Sophie Kowalsky, main character in the movie Love Me If You Dare, played by Marion Cotillard
- Sophie Lennon, from the television series The Marvelous Mrs. Maisel
- Sophie Madsen, from the television series The Blame
- Sophie Martinez, from the television series Cory in the House
- Sophie Neuenmuller, from Atelier Sophie: The Alchemist of the Mysterious Book and its sequel
- Sophie Neveu, heroine of The Da Vinci Code
- Sophie Newman, main character of The Secrets of the Immortal Nicholas Flamel
- Sophie Norton, from the television series Genie in the House
- Sophie One and Other Sophie, from the television series The Epic Tales of Captain Underpants
- Sophie Plummett 'Bliss', from Carry On Loving
- Sophie Richards, from the video game The House of the Dead
- Sophie Sanders, from Bunsen Is a Beast
- Sophie Simpson, from the television series Home and Away
- Sophie Song, from the television series Peacemaker
- Sophie Twilight, from Ms. Vampire Who Lives in My Neighborhood
- Sophie Webster, from the soap opera Coronation Street
- Sophie Zawistowska, from the novel and film Sophie's Choice
- Sophie the Sapphire Fairy, from the Rainbow Magic book franchise
- Sophie of Woods Beyond, a main character in the book series The School For Good And Evil
