= Bathoen I =

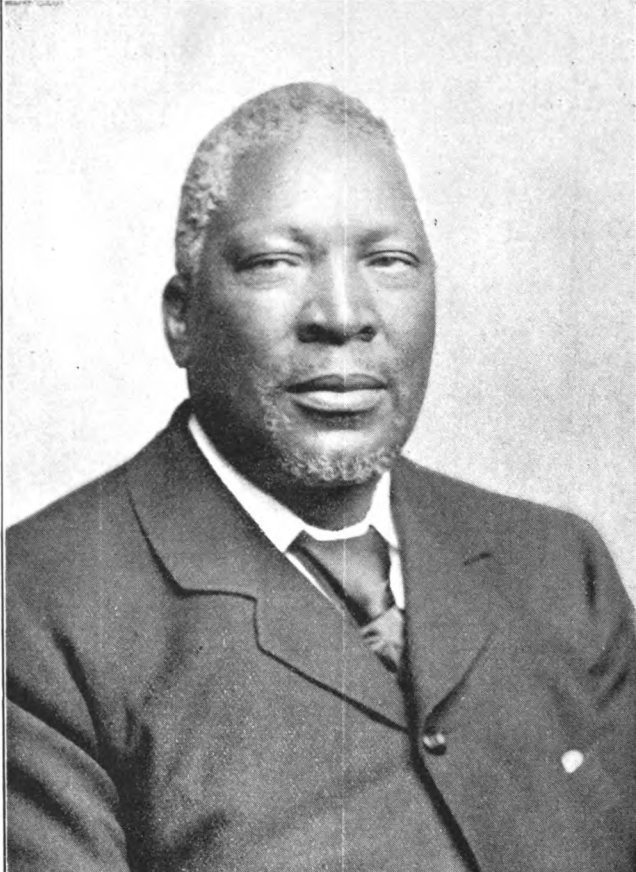
- Bathoen, c. 1895

Kgosi of the Bangwaketse
- Reign: July 1889 – 1 July 1910
- Predecessor: Gaseitsiwe
- Successor: Seepapitso III
- Born: c. 1845; Tswaaneng, Gangwaketse, Botswana
- Died: 1 July 1910 (aged 65)
- Spouse: Gagoangwe
- Issue: Seepapitso III
- Father: Gaseitsiwe

Bathoen I (Note: Sometimes rendered as Bathoeng I or Batwing I) (c. 1845 – 1 July 1910) was a kgosi (paramount chief) of the Ngwaketse people (1889-1910). Together with Khama III and Sebele I he is credited with saving the young British Bechuanaland Protectorate, a predecessor of Botswana, from being absorbed by expansionist forces in the 1890s.

== Early life and family ==
Bathoen I was the kgosi, or head, of the Bangwaketse. Bathoen was the son of kgosi Gaseitsiwe, who he eventually succeeded him as the kgosi. His mother hailed from the Batlhware people, potentially influencing his perspective. He married Gagoangwe, who eloped with him in 1875, formalized in a Christian ceremony in 1890. Their oldest son, Seepapitso III, succeeded Bathoen.

== Biography ==
He received education at a London Missionary Society (LMS) mission school, where he mastered reading and writing skills uncommon for his time.

In 1889, the British South Africa Company founded by Cecil Rhodes started to expand north, and the Tswana people became afraid that they would be eventually deposed from their lands. In response, Khama III, Sebele I, and Bathoen I, being mandated by their people, travelled to London, made public speeches in support of their causes, and finally convinced Queen Victoria to ring-fence the Bechuanaland Protectorate, which would preserve the self-government institutes of Tswana and the British would only have limited authority, such for example, control over the railway to be built. In 1908, he led the protests by the Tswana against the planned incorporation of Bechuanaland into South Africa.

== Legacy ==
Bathoen I, together with Khama III and Sebele I, is depicted on the 100 Botswana pula banknote issued in 2009. The Three Dikgosi Monument in Gaborone also commemorates the mission of the three chiefs to Great Britain.

== See also ==
- Three Dikgosi Monument

== Bibliography ==
- Lloyd, Edwin (1895). Three Great African Chiefs (Khâmé, Sebelé and Bathoeng). London, United Kingdom: T. Fisher Unwin. OCLC 739323 – via Google Books.
- Morton, Fred; Ramsay, Jeff; Themba Mgadla, Part (2008). Historical Dictionary of Botswana. Historical Dictionaries of Africa. Scarecrow Press. ISBN 978-0810854673.
- "P 100 - Bank of Botswana". Bank of Botswana.
- Seretse, Gasebalwe (17 October 2008). "Monuments worth visiting". Mmegi. Archived from the original on 20 November 2011.
