= Gaborone (Kgosi) =

Kgosi of the Tlôkwa (c. 1825–1931)

- A photograph of Gaborone, taken in the early 1900s by Alfred Martin Duggan-Cronin

Kgosi of the Tlôkwa
- Reign: c. 1880–1931
- Predecessor: Matlapeng
- Successor: Matlala a Molefê
- Born: c. 1825
- Died: 1931 (aged 105–106); Bechuanaland Protectorate

Gaborone (c. 1825 – 1931) was a kgosi (King) of the Tlôkwa, a tribe of the larger Tswana people in what is now Botswana. He became the tribe's King around 1880, after the death of his father, and secured the Tlôkwa's status as the "smallest independent tribal unit" in the Bechuanaland Protectorate. He gave his name to the city of Gaborone, Botswana's current capital.

== Early life and family ==
Gaborone's exact year of birth is unknown, but 1825 has been suggested as a likely date. His father was Matlapeng, who was the youngest of the four sons of Chief Kgosi, and his designated heir. He is the great grandson of Bogatsu. Upon Kgosi's death, Matlapeng was too young to succeed, and his older brother Lesage acted as chief in his place, subsequently leading the Tlôkwa into an alliance with Sebetwane (the leader of the Makololo). However, Basha (one of Matlapeng's other brothers) was dissatisfied with Lesage's leadership, and the Tlôkwa split into two groups. The first, led by Lesage, travelled north with Sebetwane to the Zambezi River, while the second, led by Basha, travelled south to Letlhakeng (now located in Kweneng District). Matlapeng sided with Basha, and Letlhakeng consequently became the birthplace of Gaborone, his first son.

Matlapeng succeeded Basha as King of the Tlôkwa in 1835, and moved the tribe's village to Lepalong. Fearing attacks from the Boers and the Matabele, they relocated two years later to Thaba Ntsho. However, they were soon subjected to a Boer attack, and the survivors fled back to Letlhakeng. Matlapeng subsequently allied the Tlôkwa with the Kwena tribe (led by Sechele), and his people moved to the Kwena capital, Molepolole. However, Sechele soon accused the Tlôkwa of cowardice in a battle against the Ngwato, and Matlapeng ended the alliance (on non-violent terms) and led his people to Tshwene-Tshwene (near Vleischfontein in present-day South Africa). In 1875, the Tlôkwa and the Kgatla combined to attack the Kwena at Molepolole, but were driven. Gaborone himself was responsible for rescue of the Kgatla chief, Lentswe, who had been abandoned by his fleeing tribesmen.

== Kingdom ==
Matlapeng died around 1880, and Gaborone, who was "already over sixty years of age", succeeded him as kgosi. Four years after his accession to the Kingdom, three of his brothers left the tribe to make their own ways in the world, although this was not an unusual occurrence amongst the Tswana. Around the same time as his brothers left, Gaborone moved the tribe to what is now called Tlokweng, on the Notwane River. That land fell within the nominal territory of the Kwena, but Gaborone erased the previous ill-will between the tribes by sending Sechele a gift of money and cattle.

"I'm sorry to say that old Chief Gaborone has died – he was a wonderfully picturesque figure. 110 years old, and a splendid type of the dignified courteous chief of old times before they were spoilt by European customs and clothes and education and all that rot."

— Reniera Cloete Stanley in November 1931, upon hearing of Gaborone's death

In 1895, Sechele's successor, Sebele, surrendered a strip of his land to the British, to be used for the construction of a railway by the British South Africa Company (BSAC). The land surrendered included Tlokweng. Rather than see their aging chief lose his land, the rest of the tribe determined that they would instead rent the land from the company until his death, at a rate of £150 per year. The company agreed that "the old chief should not be disturbed in his lifetime". Gaborone eventually died in 1931, at the estimated age of 106. He was succeeded by his grandson, his eldest son having predeceased him.

== Legacy ==
After Gaborone's death, the Bechuanaland Protectorate negotiated the return of the Tlôkwa land from the BSAC, and created the Batlokwa Reserve. From the 1890s, Tlokweng had become known to British settlers as simply "Gaborone's Village", and the area on the opposite (western) bank to Tlokweng was given the name "Gaborone's Block". The name subsequently spread to the administrative headquarters of the area, and was corrupted from "Gaborone's" to "Gaberones". The town which developed retained the name "Gaberones" until 1969, when it was changed to Gaborone. Three years earlier, it had become the capital of the newly independent country of Botswana.

== See also ==
- List of rulers of Tlôkwa
