= Sophie of Prussia =

Sophie of Prussia may refer to:

- Duchess Sophie of Prussia (1582–1610)
- Sophia Louise of Mecklenburg-Schwerin (1685–1735), Queen of Prussia
- Princess Sophia Dorothea of Prussia (1719–1765)
- Sophia of Prussia (1870–1932), Queen of the Hellenes, wife of King Constantine I
- Sophie, Princess of Prussia (born 1978) wife of Georg Friedrich, Prince of Prussia

== See ==
- Sophie
- Prussia
