= Soph =

Soph or Soph. may refer to:

- Soph, a nickname for Sophie or Sophia
- Sophomore
- Sophronitis (Soph.), a division of the orchard genus Cattleya
- Ed Soph (born 1945), American jazz drummer
