= Mongala (kgosi) =

18th-century Ngwaketse chief

Kgosi of the Bangwaketse
- Predecessor: Makaba I
- Successor: Moleta
- Died: c. 1770
- Issue: Moleta
- Father: Makaba I

Mongala (died c. 1770) was the kgosi of the Bangwaketse during the 18th century. He is understood to be the first leader of the Bangwaketse as an independent tribe following its split from the Bakwena. Mongala ruled until he was killed in battle against the Bakgwatlheng. He was succeeded by his son Moleta.

== Early life and reign ==
Mongala was the son of Makaba I. Makaba is said to have been the disputed leader of the Bangwaketse, against his cousin Modutlwa. Makaba's supporters proved more successful, and Modutlwa's faction eventually joined their settlement in Seoke (present-day Lobatse).

Mongala became kgosi upon his father's death, making him the first formal leader of the independent Bangwaketse. He is sometimes described as the kgosi who led the Bangwaketse from a ward of the Bakwena to be an independent tribe, but this is also attributed to his father and some of his ancestors. Mongala is known to have had nine children: Moleta, Selohilwe, Monnanyana, Losabanyana, Moabi, Thankgwane, Tsima, Mokgothu, and Mooki.

== Death and succession ==
Mongala's maternal uncle Tau was the leader of another tribe in their district, the Bakgwatlheng, whom Mongala subjugated. No conflict took place between the tribes until c. 1770, after Mongala's son Moleta injured Tau's son Seeiso. Mongala led the Bangwaketse to pursue the Bakgwatlheng after they fled to Kgalong-loo-Tau. Mongala reportedly brought only a small number of men with him. He was captured in the subsequent battle, where he was then killed with a spear. He was succeeded by his son Moleta, who led another attack on the Bakgwatlheng and destroyed their tribe to avenge him. This began a period of military growth among the Bangwaketse that led to the tribe becoming a regional power.

== Bibliography ==
- Ramsay, Jeff (2018-04-09). "House Of Ngwaketse (II) Kgosi Moleta". Mmegi.
- Schapera, I. (1942). "A Short History of the Bangwaketse". African Studies. 1 (1): 1–26. doi:10.1080/00020184208706566. ISSN 0002-0184.
