= List of rulers of Lete (Malete) =

Lete has been led by a Kgosikgolo, or a paramount chief, since its establishment in 1780. Mosadi Seboko has been the kgôsikgolo of Lete since 2002.

== List of Rulers of Balete (baMalete) ==
Territory located in present-day Botswana.

Kgosikgolo = Paramount Chief

Tenure	Incumbent	Notes
	Rulers before 1780	
c. 1470	Badimo	
	Phatle	
	Malete	
c. 1500	Lesokwana	
	Mokgware	
	Digope	
	Dira	
	Mmusi	
c. 1600	Maphalaola	
	Maoke	
	Mongatane	
	Maio	
	Kgomo	
c. 1700	Mokgwa	
	Marumo	
c. 1780	Establishment of baMalete territory	
???? to c. 1780	Pôwê I a Marumo, Kgôsikgolo	
c. 1780 to c.1805	Mokgôjwe a Pôwê, acting Kgôsikgolo	
c.1805 to c.1830	Pôwê II a Mokgôjwe, Kgôsikgolo	
c.1830 to 1886	Mokgôsi I a Pôwê, Kgôsikgolo	
1886 to 1896	Ikaneng a Mokgôsi, Kgôsikgolo	
1896 to 1906	Mokgôsi II a Ikaneng, Kgôsikgolo	
1906 to 1917	Baitlotle a Ikaneng, acting Kgôsikgolo	
1917 to 1937	Seboko I a Mokgôsi, Kgôsikgolo	
1937 to 1945	Ketswerebothata a Mokgôsi, acting Kgôsikgolo	
1945 to 1966	Mokgôsi III a Seboko, Kgôsikgolo	
1966 to 1996	Kelemogile a Seboko, acting Kgôsikgolo (Kelemogile Mokgosi)	
1 June 1996 to 17 June 2001	Seboko II a Mokgôsi, Kgôsikgolo	
17 June 2001 to 7 January 2002	Tumelo a Seboko, acting Kgôsikgolo	
7 January 2002 to present	Mosadi Seboko, Kgôsikgolo	First female kgôsikgolo of Lete

== Sources ==
- http://www.rulers.org/botstrad.html

== See also ==
- Botswana
  - Heads of state of Botswana
  - Heads of government of Botswana
  - Colonial heads of Botswana (Bechuanaland)
    - Rulers of baKgatla
    - Rulers of baKwêna
    - Rulers of baNgwaketse
    - Rulers of Bangwato (bamaNgwato)
    - Rulers of baRôlông
    - Rulers of baTawana
    - Rulers of baTlôkwa
- Lists of office-holders
