= Seleka, Botswana =

Seleka
- Location within Botswana
- Coordinates: 23°06′S 26°48′E
- Country: Botswana
- District: Central District
- Elevation: 1,009 m (3,310 ft)
- Time zone: GMT +2

Seleka is a village in near Mahalapye in the Central District of Botswana. It derives its name from the name of one of the four subgroups of the Rolong people. Seleka had 1157 inhabitants in 2011

The area was previously grouped under Tumasera - with four villages: Tubjwa, Malete, Seleka and Rasesa, but Seleka was given autonomy in 2006 and given separate census in 2011.
