= List of rulers of Tlôkwa =

== List of rulers of Tlôkwa ==
Territory located in present-day Botswana.

Kgôsikgolo = Paramount Chief

Name	Reign dates	Notes	Issue
Tshwaana	c. 1660–1680		
Mosime	c. 1680–1700		
Mothubane	c. 1700–1730		
Mokgwa	c. 1730–1750		
Taukobong	c. 1750–1770		Kgosi Molefe or Makabe; Makabe (died young); Semela, had issue: Molosiwa, had issue: Taukobong
Makabe or Makabe	c. 1770–1780		Kgosi Bogatsu or Bogatswe; Chief Phiri
Bogatswe or Bogatsu	c. 1780–1815		Kgosi Kgosi I; Chief Maboyowe
Kgosi I	c. 1815–1820 or 1815–1823		Kgosi Leshage; Kgosi Bashe; Kgosi Matlapeng
Leshage (Acting Chief)	c. 1820–1825 or 1823–1826	Died in c. 1851.	
Bashe (Acting Chief)	1825–1835 or 1826–1835		
Matlapeng	1835–1880		Kgosi Gaborone I; Sedumedi; Ramonnye; Mokwene; Kgosi; Sebolao
Gaborone I	1880–1931	Born in c. 1825 and died in 1931.	Chief Molefe (died 1922), had issue: Kgosi Matlala; Chief Rabasha; Chief Nkopo; Chief Ramaeba; Chief Kuate; Chief Peolane; Chief Kesetse
Matlala	1931–1948	Died in 1948.	Kgosi Kgosi II or Gaborone II.; Chief Bashe Gaborone; Chief Sedumedi Gaborone
Gaborone II or Kgosi II	1948–1973	Born in 1905.; Died 28 July 1973 at Ramotswa.; Also known as kaMatlala Gaborone.	
Kema (acting)	1973–?		
Michael Gaborone (acting)	?–2002		
Moshibidu Gaborone	20 August 2002–2005		Kgosi Puso Gaborone.
Puso Gaborone	August 2007–present		

== See also ==
- Botswana
  - Heads of state of Botswana
  - Heads of government of Botswana
  - Colonial heads of Botswana (Bechuanaland)
    - Rulers of baKgatla
    - Rulers of baKwêna
    - Rulers of Balete (baMalete)
    - Rulers of baNgwaketse
    - Rulers of Bangwato (bamaNgwato)
    - Rulers of baRôlông
    - Rulers of baTawana
- Lists of office-holders
