= Donald Thobega =

Personal information
- Full name: Donald Thobega
- Date of birth: 21 October 1974
- Place of birth: Ramotswa, Botswana
- Date of death: 28 March 2009 (aged 34)
- Place of death: Lobatse, Botswana
- Position: Midfielder

Senior career*
Years	Team	Apps	(Gls)
1998–2005	Mogoditshane Fighters		
2005–2009	Botswana Defence Force XI		

International career
1999–2006	Botswana	5	(0)
- * Club domestic league appearances and goals

Donald Thobega (21 October 1974 – 28 March 2009), often known by his nickname Boboza, was a Motswana footballer who played as a midfielder. A sergeant in the Botswana military, he last played for Botswana Defence Force XI. Between 1999 and 2006, he won a total of five caps for the Botswana national football team.

Thobega started his career in the Botswana lower leagues before transferring to Mogoditshane Fighters in 1998. He was a patron of the Test For Life campaign. On 28 March 2009, Thobega died three weeks after being involved in a car accident near Lobatse. He was buried in his home village of Ramotswa on 4 April 2009.

== Personal life ==
Thobega was born on 21 October 1979. He enlisted in the Botswana Defence Force as a private in 2005 and by the time of his death had been promoted to the rank of sergeant. Outside of football, he was involved in the Test For Life campaign, which encourages football supporters in Botswana to be tested for HIV and AIDS.

== Playing career ==
=== Club ===
Thobega's career began in the Botswana lower divisions, where he played for Mogonye Jungle Kings and Manyana Lucky Brothers. In 1998, he was signed for Botswana Premier League club Mogoditshane Fighters by manager David Bright. He formed a solid defensive partnership with international team-mate Mogogi Gabonamong, and was captain of the Mogoditshane team that achieved three consecutive Premier League titles in 1999, 2000 and 2001. The team also won the league in 2003, as well as winning the Botswana Challenge Cup in 1999, 2000 and 2003.

In 2005, Thobega left Mogoditshane to join the Botswana Defence Force. He became a part of the military football team, the Botswana Defence Force XI, and was appointed team captain. The team reached the final of the Challenge Cup in his first season, but lost 3–1 to Township Rollers. The following season, they again reached the final but were defeated 2–1 by Notwane FC.

=== International ===
Thobega earned his first call-up to the Botswana national football team in 1999. That year, he made his international debut as a substitute. It was another two years before he played again for his country, when he again appeared from the substitutes' bench. In 2002, he won three more caps for his country. He was last called up to the Botswana team on 9 September 2007, when manager Colwyn Rowe included Thobega in the 23-man squad to face South Africa. He did not feature in that match, and was never selected for the national side again.

== Death ==
"Boboza used to take people the way they were and also fought for what is best for the players. He had qualities to lead and I enjoyed working with him"

— Mogogi Gabonamong

In March 2009, Thobega was involved in a car accident while driving back to Lobatse from a music concert in Molapowabojang. Following the incident, he spent almost three weeks in the Intensive Care Unit of Princes Marina Hospital in Lobatse. He died of his injuries on 28 March 2009 and was buried in Ramotswa on 4 April 2009.

Botswana Defence Force XI manager Pudulogo Sokwane spoke highly of Thobega, stating that he was "shocked about his death" and that it was "really painful to have been robbed of such a star." Fellow Botswana international and Defence Force XI team-mate Nelson Gabolwelwe also praised Thobega, saying he had lost "a close friend in the team".
