= Moleta (kgosi) =

18th-century Ngwaketse chief

Kgosi of the Bangwaketse
- Reign: c. 1770 – c. 1790
- Predecessor: Mongala
- Successor: Makaba II
- Died: c. 1790
- Issue: Makaba II
- Father: Mongala

Moleta (died c. 1790) was the kgosi of the Bangwaketse c. 1770 – c. 1790. He was preceded by his father Mongala and succeeded by his son Makaba II.

== Early life ==
Moleta was born to Mongala, the kgosi of the Bangwaketse. Moleta had a son, Makaba, born c. 1760. Moleta began a rift between the Bangwaketse and the Bakgwatlheng c. 1770 when he caused an injury to Seeiso, the son of the Bakgwatlheng chief Tau. When the Bakgwatlheng left, Mongala pursued them and was killed in the resulting skirmish. Moleta then became kgosi of the Bangwaketse.

== Kgosi of the Bangwaketse ==
To avenge the death of his father, Moleta attacked the Bakgwatlheng and destroyed their tribe, leaving the survivors to join other tribes. Many returned to the Bangwaketse, including Seeiso, who became the head of a ward within the tribe.

While Moleta's father Mongala is considered the first kgosi of the independent Bangwaketse, some Bakwena accounts put Moleta at the head of the tribe when it split. Moleta's reign marked the beginning of the Bangwaketse as a major trading power in the region.

When the Bangwaketse engaged in war with various southern tribes, it was suggested to Moleta that the tribe build protective walls, so he had the tribe relocate from Seoke to the Pitsa Hills where they built stone walls. The tribe later moved to Makolontwane, Mhakane, and then Setlhabatsane.

Moleta went to war with the Bahurutshe on behalf of its leader Tirwe, whose rule had been usurped by his half-brother Boikanyo.

Moleta died c. 1790 and was succeeded by his son Makaba. The Bangwaketse say that he died of old age when his strength gave out as he walked from the kgotla to the cattle kraal. The missionary John Campbell reported a story he was told in which Moleta was poisoned by Makaba, who was jealous of one of Moleta's wives.
