= Gagoangwe =

Queen Mother of the Mmanaana Kgatla and BaNgwaketse

Gagoangwe (c. 1845 – 1924) was the Acting (Regent) King, the Queen Mother or Mohumagadi of the Mmanaana Kgatla and BaNgwaketse in what is now Botswana. Gagoangwe was a member of the Kwena family, a devout Christian, and regent for her grandson, Bathoen II.

== Early life ==
Gagoangwe was the daughter of Sechele I, kgosi or king of the BaKwena. Sechele I was converted to Christianity during the late 1840s through the work of David Livingstone; converting the entire BaKwena tribe, including Gagoangwe. When she was young, she gouged out the eye of a servant. Her father allowed the servant to put out one of her eyes in return, in accordance to the biblical Old Testament principle "an eye for an eye". Thereafter, she was known as the "one-eyed Queen".

== Marriage and children ==
Gagoangwe married her first husband, kgosi Pilane. In 1875, she eloped with Bathoen I who was heir to the leadership of the BaNgwaketse. In 1890, Bathoen I and Gagoangwe remarried in a Christian marriage ceremony, legitimizing their marriage in the eyes of the Christian church. She was a devout Christian and impacted Bathoen I's support of the London Missionary Society. In 1910, Bathoen I died and Gagoangwe's older son, Seepapitso III, became king. He was later killed by his own brother, Moepapitso, in 1916. Following this, Gagoangwe had her murderous son, Moepapitso, killed, and obtained control of the regency in 1923. She is reported to have said that "since one of her breasts [sons] had been cut off, let the other be cut off too".

== Reign ==
In 1923, Gagoangwe became the Acting King as regent for Bathoen II. She took her place as regent to preserve bogosi for her grandson. She reigned over BaNgwaketse, territory of a subgroup of the Tswana people in what is now Botswana during a crucial time for this territory. The territory was in the midst of a fight for independence against the Boers and the colonial British Empire.

Gagoangwe continued the development projects of Seepapitso III, and secured the regency for her daughter Ntebogang Ratshosa before her own death.
