= Maserame =

Maserame (Serame male) is a feminine given name of Sotho-Tswana origin meaning winter. Notable people with the name include:

- Maserame Gaseitsiwe, Motswana royalty half sister to Seepapitso III
- Maserame Ndindwa, South African singer
- Linda Maserame Motlhalo (born 1998), South African soccer player
