= Ramotswa =

- Village
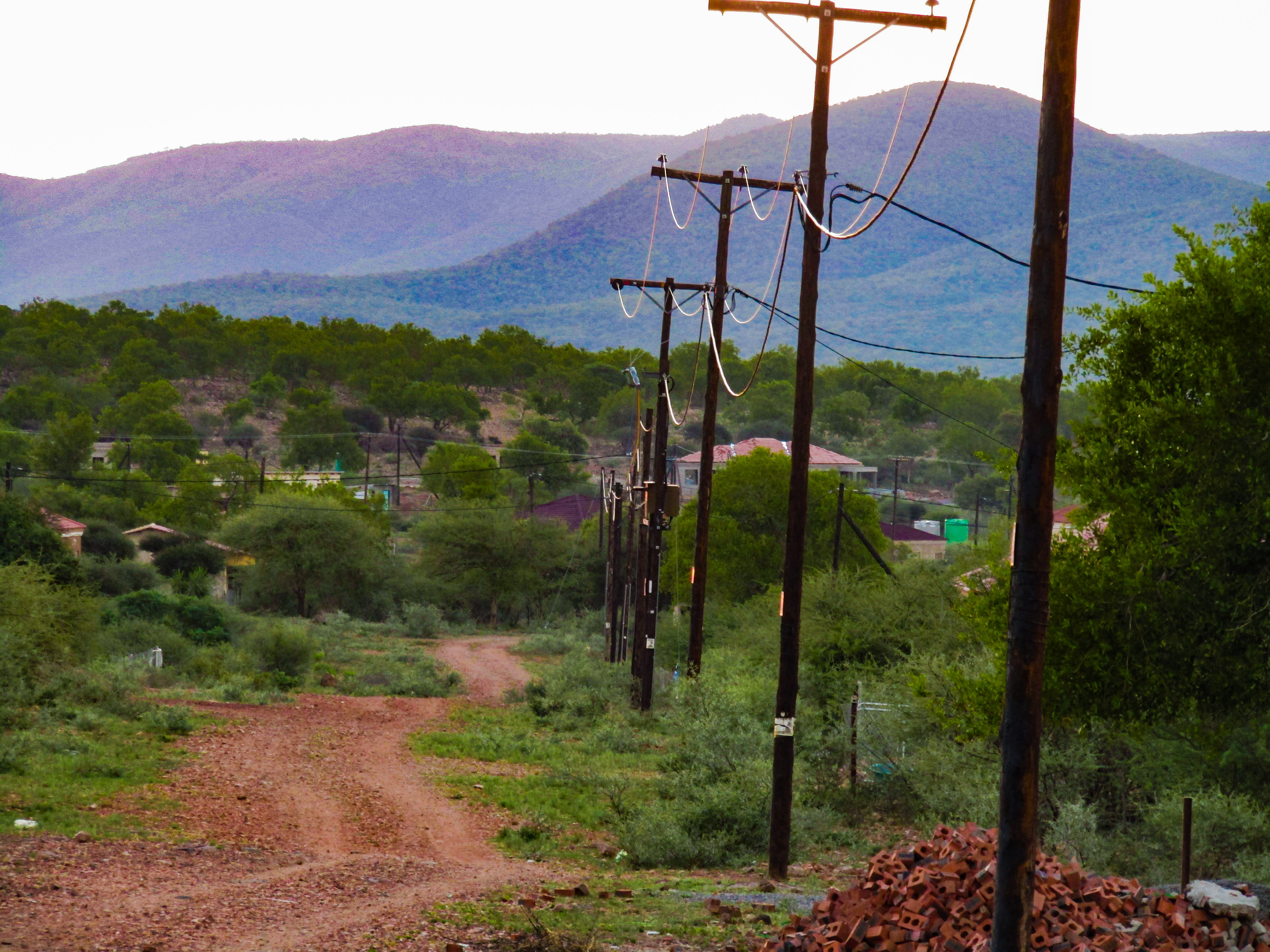
- Nickname: Rams
- Location within Botswana
- Coordinates: 25°13′S 25°40′E
- Country: Botswana
- District: South-East District
- Elevation: 1,009 m (3,310 ft)

Population (2011)
  - Total: 27,760
- Time zone: GMT +2
- Climate: BSh

Ramotswa is a village in South-East District of Botswana, southwest of the capital of Gaborone. The population was 27,760 in 2011 census. It is the tribal capital of the BaLete, an ethnic majority springing from the Nguni tribe.

Ramotswa's main industry is a wheat flour mill. The village also manufactures metal products.

Kgosi Mosadi Seboko of Ramotswa is the first woman to serve as a paramount chief in Botswana. Seboko took on her role as a village leader and representative to the House of Chiefs after her brother Kgosi Seboko II died in 2000. Her presence in the house of chiefs was hailed as a victory for women's rights in southern Africa.

The nearby hamlet of Otse is the site for Moeding College, originally a colonial secondary school and a school for disabled people run by the Campbill Rankoromane Community educational center. Police XI, Botswana Premier League champions for 2006, are also based in Otse.

The climate is semi-arid, vegetation is a tree and shrub savanna. Only a fifth of the area is farmed but the density of cattle and goats and sheep is high.

Otse is overlooked by cliffs from which a colony of vultures are easily visible on most days.

On the outskirts of village lies Mothubakwane ward, where a prominent figure Tlotlo Oepeng lives. Other notable places include Siga ward, home to Killer Giants the local football club, Lesetlhana ward housing the central business district and Taung village where the industry lies.

When The BaLete settled in Ramotswa remains a topic of much debate, as the local history is traditionally an oral one as with a lot of African villages and towns where the 'infrastructure of urban development' is new. However residents of Ramotswa, and surrounding areas have contributed much to the development of the region, and often bravely so in the context of the towns proximity to the much more 'in the public eye' towns, and cities of South Africa.

== Notable natives and residents ==
- Mosadi Seboko, Motswana chief of the Balete people in Botswana
- Donald Thobega, football player
- Ofentse Nato, football player
