= Gorewang Kgamane =

Bangwato regency official (died 1931)

Gorewang Kgamane (died 1931) was a member of the Bangwato royal family in the Bechuanaland Protectorate, in present-day Botswana. He briefly headed the administration of the Bangwato as Chairman of the Council of Regency between the death of Sekgoma II on 17 November 1925 and the installation of Tshekedi Khama as regent on 19 January 1926.

== Council of Regency ==
Sekgoma II died in November 1925, leaving as his heir his son Seretse Khama, who was then four years old and too young to succeed him. Gorewang Kgamane was placed in charge of the tribe pending the appointment of a regent. In November 1925 the Resident Commissioner, Colonel Ellenberger, convened a meeting of the kgotla at which a council of principal headmen was elected to assist Gorewang. The historian Michael Crowder characterised Gorewang as a weak figure, and described the body as an ad hoc council created to support him rather than a regency council proper.

Tshekedi Khama, a younger son of Khama III, was named regent for the duration of Seretse's minority and was installed on 19 January 1926, after which he dissolved the council. He served as regent until 1949.

== See also ==
- List of rulers of Ngwato (Mangwato)
