= 2001 Botswana judicial reform referendum =

A referendum on judicial reform was held in Botswana on 3 November 2001, having been originally scheduled for 6 October, but later postponed. The referendum asked eight separate questions about judges and courts, all of which were approved, seven by a margin of over 70%. Voter turnout for the referendum was just 4.9%, with 22,600 votes from a total of 460,252 registered voters. The postponement of the referendum by the government, a legal challenge by the Tswana nationalist group Pitso Ya Batswana, and a call by the group for a boycott were all suggested as reasons for the low turnout. Pitso Ya Batswana claimed that the referendum was an attempt by the BaKalanga ethnic group, who are over-represented in the judicial system, to increase their hold over it.

== Question I ==
The first question was regarding qualification of candidates to be appointed judges on the High Court:

Do you agree that, for a person to be appointed a Judge of the High Court, he must qualify and have been qualified to practice as an advocate or attorney for not less than 10 years, or being qualified to practice as an advocate or attorney, has taught law in a recognized university for not less than 10 years, or be a Chief Magistrate who has held that office for not less than 5 years?

The proposal was passed with a 74.2% approval.

Choice	Votes	%
For	16,038	74.2
Against	5,574	25.8
Invalid/blank votes	985	–
Total	22,597	100
Registered voters/turnout	460,252	4.9
Source: African Elections Database

== Question II ==
The second question was regarding qualification of candidates to be appointed judges on the Court of Appeal:

Do you agree that, for a person to be appointed a Judge of the Court of Appeal, he must qualify and have been qualified to practice as an advocate or attorney for not less than 10 years, or being qualified to practice as an advocate or attorney, has taught law in a recognized university for not less than 10 years?

The proposal was passed with a 74.81% approval.

Choice	Votes	%
For	16,152	74.8
Against	5,436	25.2
Invalid/blank votes	988	–
Total	22,576	100
Registered voters/turnout	460,252	4.9
Source: African Elections Database

== Question III ==
The third question was regarding a change in the designation of High Court judges:

Do you agree that the designation of High Court Judges as "Puisne Judges" be altered to "Judges"?

The proposal was passed with a 76.74% approval.

Choice	Votes	%
For	16,565	76.7
Against	5,019	23.3
Invalid/blank votes	995	–
Total	22,579	100
Registered voters/turnout	460,252	4.9
Source: African Elections Database

== Question IV ==
The fourth question was regarding raising the retirement age of High Court and Court of Appeal judges:

Do you agree that the retiring age of the Judges of the High Court and Court of Appeal should be increased from 65 to 70?

The proposal was passed, although with only a 53.93% approval, far lower than any of the other questions.

Choice	Votes	%
For	11,751	53.9
Against	10,037	46.1
Invalid/blank votes	789	–
Total	22,577	100
Registered voters/turnout	460,252	4.9
Source: African Elections Database

== Question V ==
The fifth question was regarding the nomination of members of the Judicial Service Commission:

Do you agree that the members of the Judicial Service Commission who are nominated by the Law Society or appointed by the President shall serve a renewable term of two years, and may be removed by the Commission in the first case and by the President in the second for inability or gross misbehavior?

The proposal was passed with a 72.45% approval.

Choice	Votes	%
For	15,765	72.5
Against	5,994	27.5
Invalid/blank votes	802	–
Total	22,561	100
Registered voters/turnout	460,252	4.9
Source: African Elections Database

== Question VI ==
The sixth question was regarding the Judicial Service Commission:

Do you agree that the members of the Judicial Service Commission, who shall decide by a majority vote, the chairman having a casting vote in the event of an equality of votes, should be the Chief Justice as Chairman, the President or the most senior Justice of the Court of Appeal, the Attorney-General, the Chairman of the Public Service Commission, a member of the Law Society nominated by it, and a person of integrity and experience who is not a legal practitioner appointed by the President?

The proposal was passed with a 72.68% approval.

Choice	Votes	%
For	15,833	72.7
Against	5,951	27.3
Invalid/blank votes	789	–
Total	22,573	100
Registered voters/turnout	460,252	4.9
Source: African Elections Database

== Question VII ==
The seventh question was regarding the Industrial Court:

Do you agree that the Industrial Court should be a superior court of record?

The proposal was passed with a 74.5% approval.

Choice	Votes	%
For	16,216	74.5
Against	5,549	25.5
Invalid/blank votes	792	–
Total	22,557	100
Registered voters/turnout	460,252	4.9
Source: African Elections Database

== Question VIII ==
The eighth and last question was regarding the Chief Justice:

Do you agree that the Chief Justice be empowered to appoint a Rules of Court Advisory Committee to advise him on the review of the rules of practice and procedure of the High Court?

The proposal was passed with a 76.68% approval, the highest of all the proposals.

Choice	Votes	%
For	16,584	76.9
Against	4,895	23.1
Invalid/blank votes	1,023	–
Total	22,592	100
Registered voters/turnout	460,252	4.9
Source: African Elections Database
