= 1997 Botswana electoral reform referendum =

A referendum on electoral reform was held in Botswana on 4 October 1997. The referendum had three separate proposals, and came following promises made by President Quett Masire after violent protests in 1995. All three proposals were passed, although voter turnout was only around 17%.

== Question I ==
The first question asked voters whether they approved of amending the constitution, and replace the post of Supervisor of Elections, introduced following the 1987 referendum, and replacing it with an independent electoral commission.

Choice	Votes	%
For	45,122	73.16
Against	16,550	26.84
Invalid/blank votes	201	–
Total	61,873	100
Registered voters/turnout	370,173	16.71
Source: African Elections Database

== Question II ==
The second question asked voters whether they approved of amending the constitution to allow Botswanans living abroad to vote.

Choice	Votes	%
For	43,555	70.42
Against	18,295	29.58
Invalid/blank votes	197	–
Total	62,047	100
Registered voters/turnout	370,173	16.76
Source: African Elections Database

== Question III ==
The third question asked voters whether they approved of amending the constitution to lower the voting age from 21 to 18.

Choice	Votes	%
For	36,275	58.74
Against	25,475	41.26
Invalid/blank votes	198	–
Total	61,948	100
Registered voters/turnout	370,173	16.73
Source: African Elections Database
