= Vleischfontein =

- Location within North West (South African province) Location within South Africa
- Coordinates: 25.037°S 26.434°E
- Country: South Africa
- Province: North West
- District: Bojanala Platinum
- Municipality: Moses Kotane

Area
  - Total: 1.79 km^{2} (0.69 sq mi)

Population (2011)
  - Total: 807
  - Density: 451/km^{2} (1,170/sq mi)

Racial makeup (2011)
  - Black African: 99.8%
  - White: 0.2%

First languages (2011)
  - Tswana: 98.0%
  - S. Ndebele: 1.0%
  - Other: 1.0%
- Time zone: UTC+2 (SAST)

Vleischfontein, also known as Sesobe, is a town in Moses Kotane Local Municipality in the North West province of South Africa.

It was founded in 1884 as a Jesuit mission station, built on land bought from a local farmer, on the farm Vleischfontein. It was intended that the mission station would serve as a stopover point for missionaries bound for the Zambesi Mission. The mission was successful, and the local baPhalane slowly converted to Christianity; the missionaries also managed to grow wheat, citrus fruits, figs and vines.

When the Zambezi missions was closed, the Vleischfontein mission was handed over to the Missionary Oblates of Mary Immaculate. In 1948, the introduction of apartheid saw the designation of the district as a whites-only area, and the Oblates were forced to sell the mission and leave, relocating to the nearby Silkaatskop. Vleischfontein was then purchased by an Afrikaner farmer. The mission was temporarily reopened in 1976, but when the area became part of the Madikwe Game Reserve in the 1980s it was shut down permanently.
