= List of rulers of Rolong =

This is a list of rulers of Rolong. The Rolong tribe has had rulers since at least around 1760. The tribe's territory is located in present-day Botswana and South Africa.

== List of Rulers of baRôlông ==
Kgôsikgolo = Paramount Chief

Tenure	Incumbent	Notes
c. 1760	Secession of BaRôlông bTshidi segment from other baRôlông segments	
c.1760 to c.1775	Tshidi a Tau, Kgôsikgolo	
c.1775 to c.1785	Thutlwa a Tshidi, Kgôsikgolo	
c.1785 to c.1790	Makgêtla a Tau, acting Kgôsikgolo	
c.1790 to 1815	Lesomo a Tshidi, acting Kgôsikgolo	
1815 to 1848	Tawana a Thutlwa, Kgôsikgolo	
1848 to 1849	Makgêtla a Tshidi, acting Kgôsikgolo	
1849 to 19 October 1896	Montshiwa a Tawana, Kgôsikgolo	
1896 to 1903	Bêsêlê I a Montshiwa, acting Kgôsikgolo (Wessels)	
1903 to 1911	Badirile a Montshiwa, acting Kgôsikgolo	
1911 to 1915	Lekôkô a Marumolwa, acting Kgôsikgolo	
1915 to 1917	Joshua a Molêma, acting Kgôsikgolo	
1917 to 1919	Bakolopang a Montshiwa, acting Kgôsikgolo	
1919 to 1954	Letlamoreng I a Kebalepile, Kgôsikgolo (a Montshiwa)	
1954 to 19??	Tiêgo Tawana a Seleri, acting Kgôsikgolo	
19?? to 1970	Kebalepile a Lotlamoreng, Kgôsikgolo (Kebalepile Montshiwa)	
1970 to 1977	Bêsêlê II, Kgôsikgolo (Besele Montshiwa)	1st Term
1977 to 1982	R. Motlhatledi, Kgôsikgolo, Tribal Authority	
1982 to 17 June 2001	Setumo Montshiwa, Kgôsikgolo (Besele Montshiwa)	2nd Term
23 February 2002 to present	Letlamoreng II, Kgôsikgolo (Letlamoreng Montshiwa)	

At this point the Barolong found themselves separated by the Botswana - South Africa border. There are other Barolong in South Africa with different leaders but emanating from the same ancestry.

== See also ==
- Botswana
  - Heads of state of Botswana
  - Heads of government of Botswana
  - List of commissioners of Bechuanaland
    - Rulers of baKgatla
    - Rulers of baKwêna
    - Rulers of Balete (baMalete)
    - Rulers of baNgwaketse
    - Rulers of Bangwato (bamaNgwato)
    - Rulers of baTawana
    - Rulers of baTlôkwa
- Lists of office-holders
