= Ntebogang Ratshosa =

Former Botswanan regent of the BaNgwaketse

- Born: 1882
- Died: 1979 (aged 96–97)
- Citizenship: Botswana
- Occupation: Regent of BaNgwaketse
- Years active: 1924–8
- Organization: Native Advisory Council

Ntebogang Ratshosa (1882–1979 (Note: Sources from Botswana suggest that she died in 1974.)) was motshwareledi (regent) of the BaNgwaketse, one of the eight clans of present-day Botswana, from 1924 to 1928. She was the first woman to serve on the Native Advisory Council of Botswana.

== Biography ==
Ntebogang was born in 1882. Her parents were Gagoangwe and Bathoen I. Her parents eloped together in 1875 and married in a Christian church in 1890. Raised as a Christian, Ntebogang also received a formal education. Her siblings included future king Seepapitso II, who was murdered by their brother Moepapitso in 1916. As a result, their mother Gagoangwe had Moepapitso put to death, and Gagoangwe assumed the regency whilst Seepapitso II's son Bathoen II was underage.

== Regency ==
In 1923, Gagoangwe, already dying from cancer, became motshwareledi, with a determination to preserve rule for her eight-year-old grandson Bathoen II. She died from cancer in the same year, but before her death she ensured that regency for Bathoen II would continue under his aunt Ntebogang Ratshosa's care. Female regents were recognised in many different groups in Botswana. This brought stability to the kingdom after three rulers in seven years. Ntebogang appointed a council of six leaders, but worked most closely with one - Kgampu Kamodi. Both Ntebogang and her mother's regencies were formally recognised by the British, who believed that they would support British interests in their kingdoms. She enforced public codes of conduct, including banning the sale of fermented sorghum liquor.

=== Agricultural programmes ===
Plaques of locusts were a major issue and early in Ntebogang's reign she took measures to enable farmers to try and combat their effects. She organised an extensive well-digging programme, which provided water which could dilute insecticides, as well as water for the oxen that pulled the wagons of the anti-locust teams. She also extended the piped water scheme in Kanye. In order to breed cattle scientifically, she established a bull camp.

=== Health care ===
Ntebogang's members of the Seventh Day Adventist Church gave her the contacts necessary to establish a healthcare system in Gangwaketse. Clinics were introduced in Kanye, followed by a hospital, then further clinics in Manyana and Lehututu. A tribal levy was introduced which established an NHS-style system, twenty years before its introduction in the UK. Despite this success, the example of the relative scarcity of medical care compared to the population in her country was used as an example when other chiefs wanted to clarify with the British government the role of 'native doctors': "Where, then, will the majority of our people get white men's medicine? ... no other alternative than to seek the help of our native doctors, who will of course treat according to their own medical knowledge".

=== Politics ===
Ntebogang was the first woman to serve on the Native Advisory Council. She was outspoken there, particularly against the threat that her land in Bechuanaland might be subsumed into the Union of South Africa.

In 1926 a feud developed between the Ratshosa Brothers, to whom Ntebogang was related, and regent Tshekedi Khama. The Brothers had been banned from Gammangwato. Ntebogang gave political refuge to the Ratshosa wives, on the understanding that they did not try to create any political intrigues. This neutrality was accepted by Tshekedi Khama and in 1928, Ntebogang received 150 cattle from him, which had previously been taken by Jonnie Ratshosa.

=== Resistance to the British Protectorate ===
Alongside other chiefs, Ntebogang stood up to the Resident Magistrate, appointed by the British. In 1927 she protested alongside other chiefs against the Native Marriage Proclamation, which decreed that for those married under the Christian faith or British law it was the magistrate, not the chief, who had jurisdiction over the division of property in the case of divorce or death. They argued this deprived the chief of a vital community role in settlement of inheritance.

During the anti-locust campaigns, the Protectorate sought South African assistance. However, Ntebogang believed that if the South Africans found minerals whilst digging wells, they would claim the land as their own. She resisted their involvement and the work was done by the Bangwaketse and local Protectorate employees.

=== End of regency ===
As Ntebogang became increasingly outspoken against the Protectorate in 1927, and joined forces with other political leaders, her power became an increasing threat. The British decided to recall Bathoen II from school, so that he could begin his reign.

At the accession of Bathoen II to the kingship of the Bangwatetse in 1928, Ntebogang gave a speech in Setswana highlighting the responsibility of rule. It is not just an important record of the event, but an important example of Setswana oratory.

Her rule, and that of other regents like her mother and Mohumagadi Moremi, was significant as it heralded an era where women in Botswana could take an increasingly active role in politics.

Ntebogang died in 1979. She had continued to advise Bathoen II throughout his rule and had remained a staunch member of the Seventh Day Adventist Church.

== Personal life ==
Ntebogang was the second wife of Ratshosa Motswetle, with whom she had three children. After he died in 1917, she returned to GaNgwaketse, to support her mother and nephew.

Ntebogang joined the Seventh-day Adventist Church in 1923, having been brought up in a different denomination.
