= Balete people =

Southern African ethnic group

The Balete people are a Southern African ethnic group.

In Botswana they have occupied a permanent territory since around 1780, officially recognized as a civilisation reserve in 1909. They are the only one of eight major tribes that do not belong to the related Tswana people. They still have a traditional King, or Kgosikgolo. Balete are settled in Southern Botswana villages that include Ramotswa, Gabane, Otse, Metsimotlhabe, Mogobane and Modipane, as well as Lekgophung in the North West Province, South Africa.

== List of chiefs/Kings ==
- Phatlê (Wa ko Tlhôgô ya Tlou)
- Malete
- Maphalaolê
- Mongatane
- Maio
- Kgomo
- Mokgwê
- Marumô
- Pôwê I a Marumo
- 1805 Mokgôjwe a Pôwê (acting)
- 1805–1830 Pôwê II a Mokgôjwe (died c. 1830)
- 1830–1886 Mokgôsi I a Pôwê
- 1886–1896 Ikaneng a Mokgôsi
- 1896–1906 Mokgôsi II a Ikaneng
- 1906–1917 Baitlotle a Ikaneng (acting)
- 1917–1937 Seboko I a Mokgôsi
- 1937–1945 Ketswerebothata a Mokgôsi (acting)
- 1945–1966 Mokgôsi III a Seboko
- 1966–1996 Kelemogile a Seboko (Kelemogile Mokgosi) acting
- 1996–2001 Seboko II a Mokgôsi
- 2001–2002 Tumelo a Seboko (acting)
- 2002–present Mosadi Seboko

== Leboko la Balete (The Balete Poem) ==
Matebele a mantsho aga
ma masodi-a mphela (a mazulu a mphela)
A ga selala le namane letlhakoleng
di robaroba matlhakola
dia robile di satla go a lala
namane tse di naka di diobe
ere faere "gou!"di be dire "goo"
kgodumo...o e tshabele mogotlhong
more wa nare ga o lebalebelwe;
mutlwa gao tswane le lenaka, o
ka tlhomolwa.
mogatsa mmolaya nare o ya a batla seantlo
a sale gale. Barwa taola tsa mere
Barwa motlhana o tlhokile motsei
o jelwe ke magakabe le manong
Barwa kgodumo ya leselesele

== Revival of Initiation Schools ==
September 1, 2012 saw the beginning of a new era for the Balete tribe, as it revived its dormant tradition of male initiation, Bogwera, under the guidance of its first ever female Paramount Chief Mosadi Seboko. Among initiates were five councilors from the South East District Council – two from the Botswana Congress Party, another two from the ruling Botswana Democratic party and one from the Botswana Movement for Democracy. The naming of the new regiment ‘Matsosa ngwao’ (Cultural revivers) by Kgosi Seboko coincided with the annual national cultural day celebrations. The event attracted members of the diplomatic corps from Mozambique, Nigeria, the United States of America, the UK and the Chinese Women's Association.

== Sources and references ==
World Statesmen website on political and administrative entities
