= List of rulers of Ngwato (Mangwato) =

This article lists the rulers of the Bangwato tribe, a tribe located in present-day Botswana, from 1780 to the present day. The ruler is referred to as the Kgôsikgolo. Since 1925, the tribe has been ruled by regents, in place of Seretse Khama and his son Ian Khama.

== List of Rulers of the Bangwato (bamaNgwato) ==
(Dates in italics indicate de facto continuation of office)

Tenure	Incumbent	Notes
1780	bamaNgwato territorial establishment	
1780 to 1795	Mathiba a Moleta, Kgôsikgolo	
1795 to 1817	Kgama I a Mathiba, Kgôsikgolo	
1817 to 1828	Kgari a Kgama Pebane, Kgôsikgolo	
1828 to 1833	Sedimo a Molosiwa, acting Kgôsikgolo	
1833 to 1835	Khama II a Kgari, Kgôsikgolo	
1835 to 1857	Sekgoma I a Kgari Mmaphiri, Kgôsikgolo	1st Term
1857 to 1859	Matsheng a Kgari, Kgôsikgolo	1st Term
1859 to 1866	Sekgoma I a Kgari Mmaphiri, Kgôsikgolo	2nd Term
1866 to 1872	Matsheng a Kgari, Kgôsikgolo	2nd Term
1872 to 1873	Khama III Boikanyo a Sekgoma, Kgôsikgolo (Khama III)	1st Term
1873 to 1875	Sekgoma I a Kgari Mmaphiri, Kgôsikgolo	3rd Term
1875 to 21 February 1923	Khama III Boikanyo a Sekgoma, Kgôsikgolo (Khama III)	2nd Term
21 February 1923 to 17 November 1925	Sekgoma II a Khama Leraraetsa, Kgôsikgolo	
17 November 1925 to 19 January 1926	Gorewang a Kgamane, Chairman of the Council of Regency	
19 January 1926 to 14 September 1933	Tshêkêdi a Khama, Regent (Tshekedi Khama)	1st Term
September 1933 to 4 October 1933	Serogola a Gagoitsege, acting Regent	
4 October 1933 to 23 June 1949	Tshêkêdi a Khama, Regent (Tshekedi Khama)	2nd Term
23 June 1949 to 8 March 1950	Sêrêtsê a Sekgoma a Kgama, Kgôsikgolo; Seretse Khama	Not recognized by protectorate authority; renouncing claim 26 September 1956
13 March 1950 to 26 May 1952	Keabôka Kgamane, Kgôsikgolo, African Authority	
13 May 1953 to May 1964	Rrasebolai a Gorewang George, Kgôsikgolo, African Authority (Rasebolai Khamane)	
May 1964 to 1969	Leeapeetswe a Tshêkêdi, Kgôsikgolo, Tribal Authority	
1969 to 1974	Leeapeetswe a Tshêkêdi, Kgôsikgolo, Regent	
1974 to 1979	Mokgatsha Mokgadi, Kgôsikgolo, Tribal Authority	
5 May 1979 to 22 April 2022	Sediegeng Kgamane, Kgôsikgolo, Regent (Sediegeng Kgamane)	
22 April 2022 to 30 November 2024	Serogola Seretse, Kgôsikgolo, Regent	
30 November 2024 to Present	Khama IV a Seretse, Kgôsikgolo	

Note

Ian Khama, the fourth president of Botswana, son of Seretse Khama (first president of Botswana after independence in 1966), though the rightful heir of the Bamangwato tribe in Serowe, was crowned in 1979. However due to his political career, his relatives have served as regent for him

== Sources ==
- http://www.rulers.org/botstrad.html

== See also ==
- Botswana
  - Heads of state of Botswana
  - Heads of government of Botswana
  - List of commissioners of Bechuanaland
    - Rulers of baKgatla
    - Rulers of baKwêna
    - Rulers of Balete (baMalete)
    - Rulers of baNgwaketse
    - Rulers of baRôlông
    - Rulers of baTawana
    - Rulers of baTlôkwa
- Lists of office-holders
