= Kgomokasitwa =

Village in Southern District, Botswana

Kgomokasitwa village
- Coordinates: 25°05′33″S 25°37′17″E

Kgomokasitwa is a small village in the Southern District of Botswana, located some few kilometers north of Lobatse. To reach the village you travel by the A2 road between Lobatse and Kanye, then branch to the right at the Molapowabojang ward called Tshweneyagae. Kgomokasitwa has a population of about 1423 (2011 Census). The village falls under the administration of the Southern District Council which is headquartered in Kanye, Botswana. For civil administration it falls under Moshupa Sub District.

== History ==
Kgomokasitwa gets its name from a hill which is located 6 km from the village. Occasionally there can be seen mist at the top of the hill indicating that it may be cold up there, hence the name Kgomokasitwa or loosely translated, Freezing Cow. ( Kgomo = cow) and (sitwa = freezing). The majority of people in the village are of Bangwaketse tribe even though it is multi tribal.

== Administration ==
The local councilor is Mr. Sonny Phiri of Botswana Democratic Party. The village Chief or Headman of records is Mr. Sam Tshetlhe Radimpa from May 2013.

== Geography ==
Kgomokasitwa is located in hilly area. To the central east there is lentswe la Kgomokasitwa (Kgomokasitwa Hill); to the right east there are Mmadithakwe Hill and Mokgorana Hill. To the north there is Lentswe la diphala. There are seasonal rivers, Kwelepane River to the south and Chawe River to the north and far western parts of the village.

== Education ==
Kgomokasitwa has one primary school for pupils aged from 5 years to 13 years. The pupils complete a 7-year curriculum which is finished by seating for PSLE (Primary School Leaving Examination) Students then attend intermediate junior high in either Molapowabojang or Lobatse. For High school there is Lobatse Secondary School in Lobatse.

== Health ==
Kgomokasitwa is serviced by Kgomokasitwa Health Post for primary care, and for hospital the community depends on Athlone Hospital in Lobatse.

== Developments ==
- Electricity: Serviced by Botswana Power Cooperation (BPC) under the national grid as from 2003.
- Water: Until 2008, Kgomokasitwa was supplied by Water Affairs, but now the services are provided by Water Utilities Cooperation (WUC).

== Transport ==
Accessible from Tshweneyagae Junction, from A2- Lobatse- Windhoek highway or from B105 from Magotlhwane. B105 runs from Mogobane (By Otse Police College) to Ranaka.

== Pictures ==
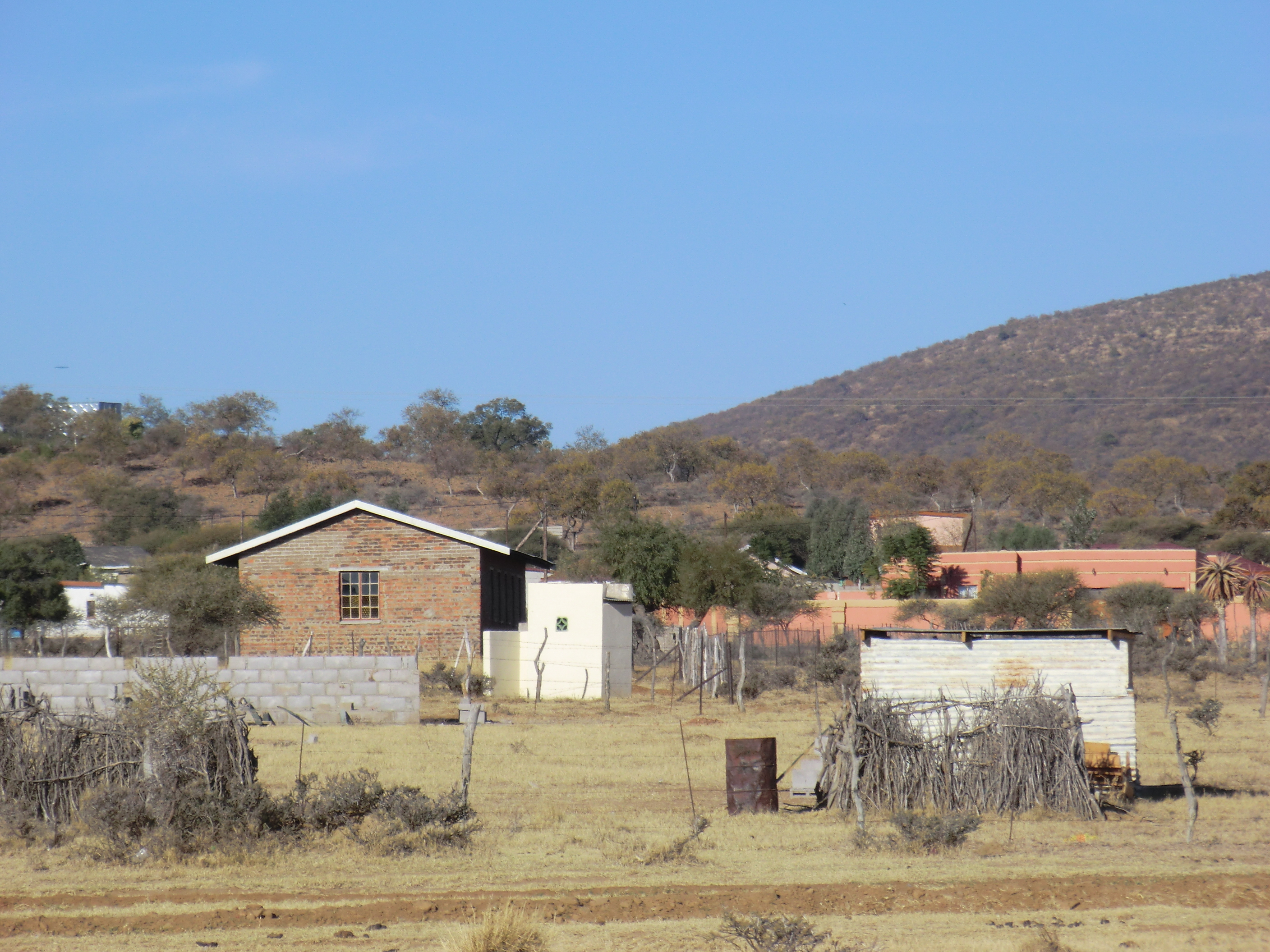
View of the town from the south.

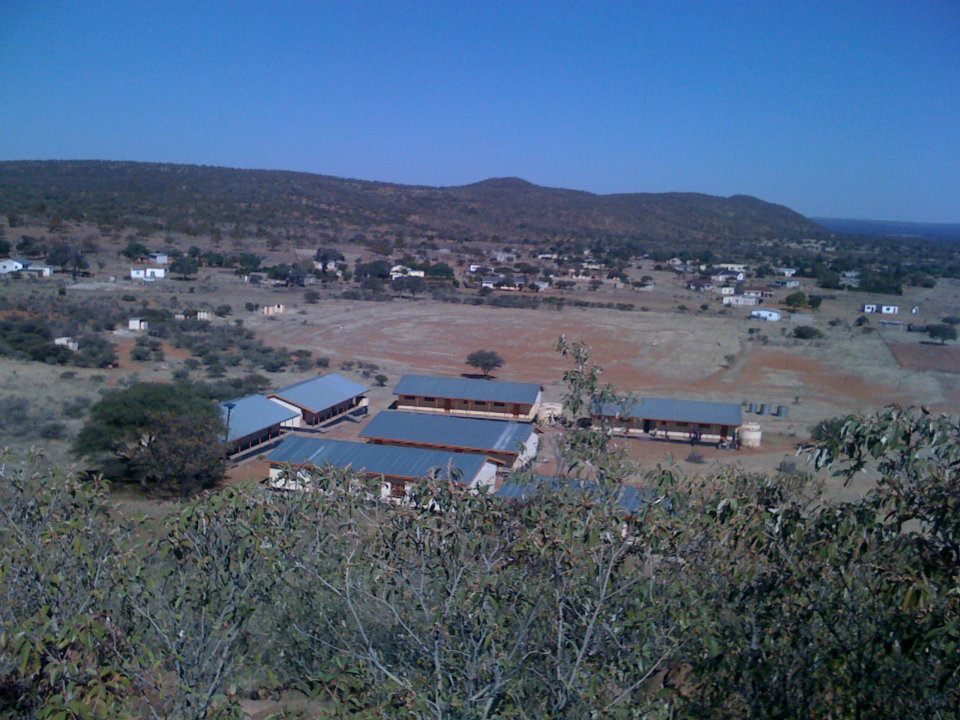
Kgomokasitwa Primary School.

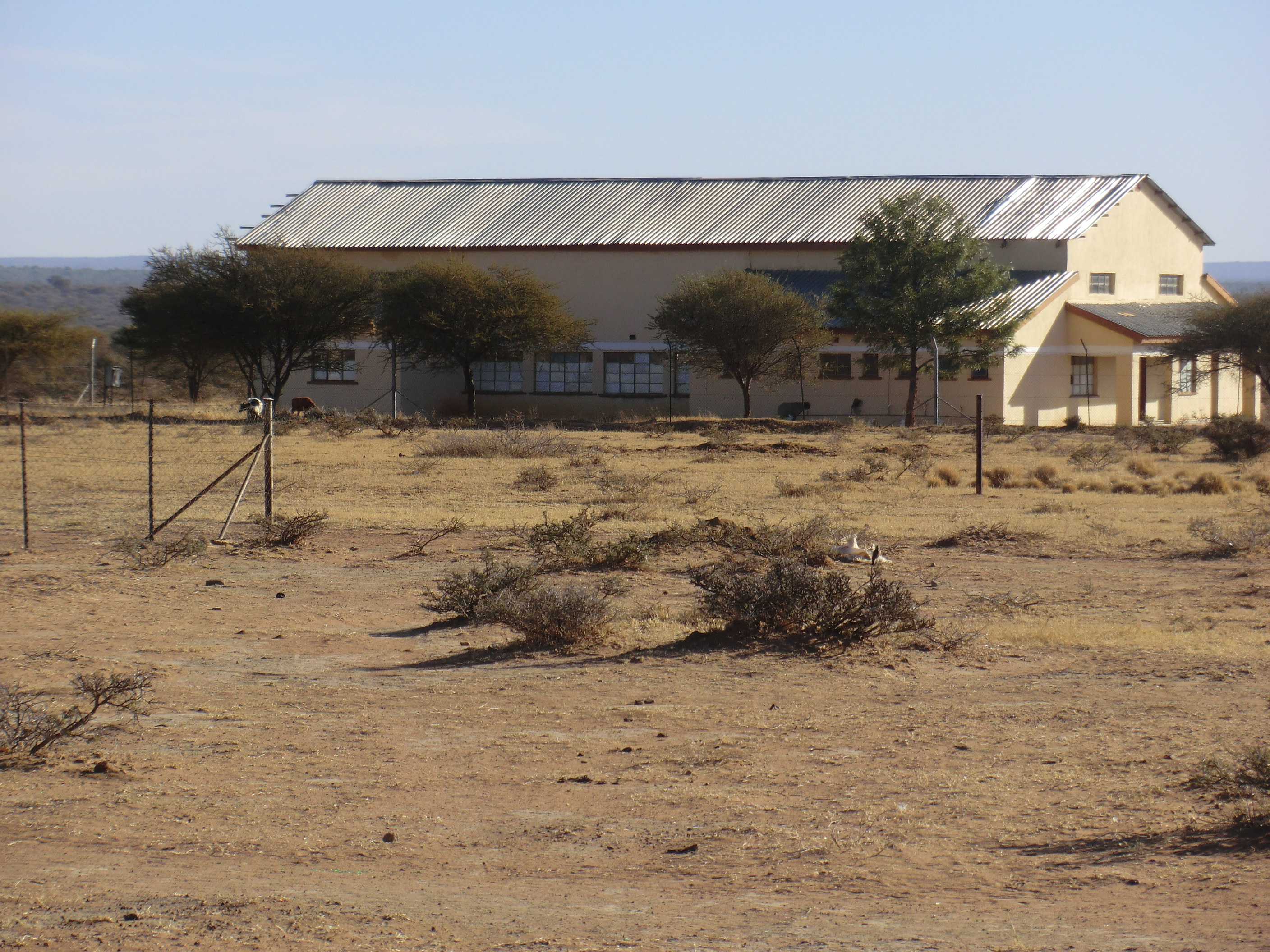
Kgomokasitwa Community Hall.
