= Sophie Elizéon =

French civil servant (born 1970)

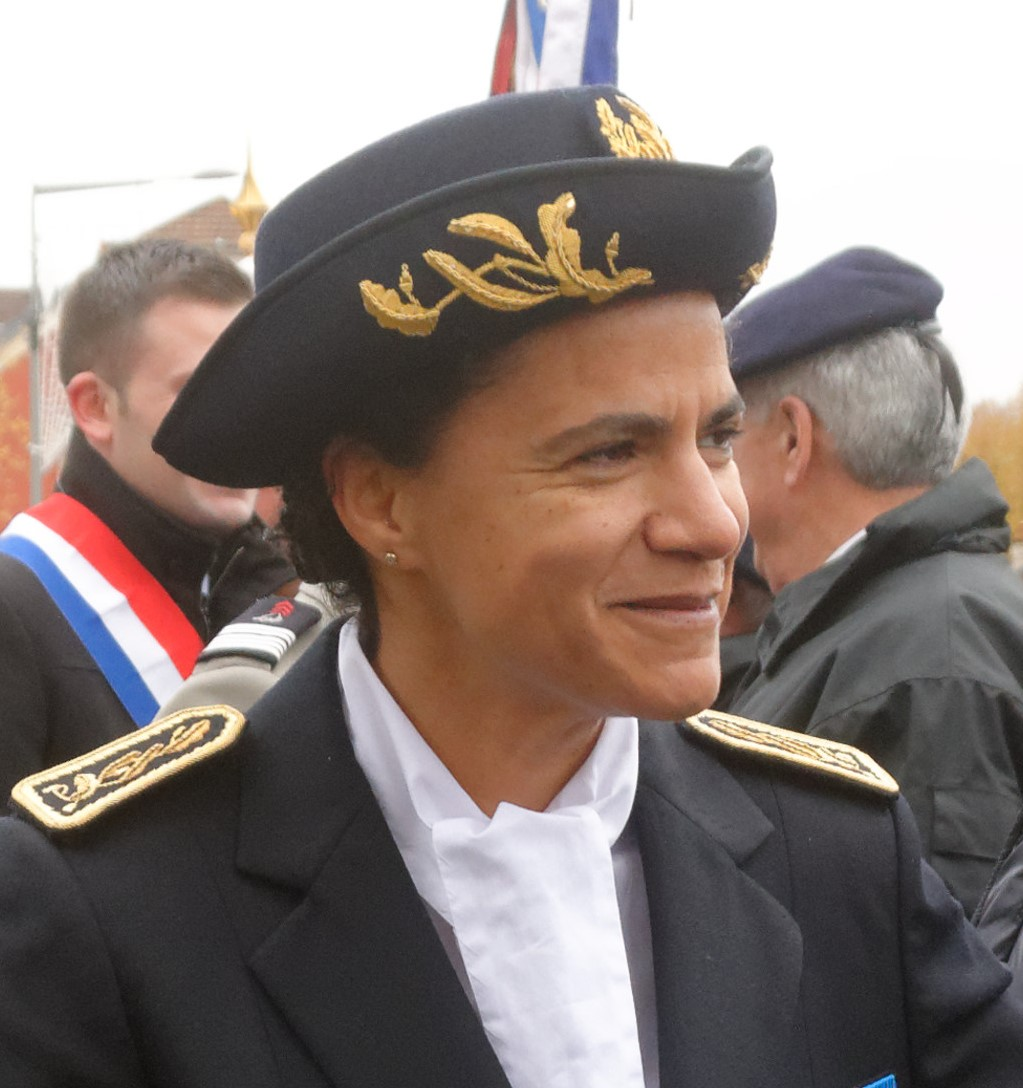
- Elizéon in 2017

Prefect of Ardèche
- In office 21 August 2023 – 25 August 2025
- Preceded by: Thierry Devimeux

Personal details
- Born: 3 November 1970 (age 55)

Sophie Elizéon (born 3 November 1970) is a French civil servant. From 2023 to 2025, she served as prefect of Ardèche. From 2021 to 2023, she served as interministerial delegate for racism, antisemitism and homophobia. From 2019 to 2021, she served as prefect of Aude. From 2017 to 2019, she served as prefect of the Territoire de Belfort. From 2012 to 2015, she served as interministerial delegate for equal opportunities for overseas France.

== Honors and awards ==
Knight of the Order of Legion of Honour
