= Sophie Körnerová =

Czech stage actor

Sophie Körnerová (1750–1817) was a Czech stage actress.

She was married to the actor J. Körner. She made her debut in 1766 and was engaged in travelling theater companies, such as the famous company of JJ Brunian and K. Wahr, and was between 1771 and 1779 engaged at several theatres: in Wiener Neustadt (1771–1772, 1772–1773), Eszterházy Palace (1772–1776), Pressburg (1773–1774, 1774–1775, 1777–1778, 1778–1779), Salzburg (1775–1776), Pest (1776–1777), Kotcích Theater in Prague (1779–1783), Estates Theatre (1783–1784, 1788–1791). She was a famous actor of her time who was viewed with great respect by the critics for her artistic ability, praised for her dramatic training, mimicry, and voice, and for her ability in studying her roles to be able to portray various roles authentically, which was not a given thing in an epoch where most actors still specialized in a particular type of role. Initially often playing ingenues and heroines, she became known as a tragedienne.
