= 1987 Botswana electoral reform referendum =

- 27 October 1987

Results
Choice	Votes	%
Yes	45,227	78.10%
No	12,681	21.90%
Valid votes	57,908	100.00%
Invalid or blank votes	0	0.00%
Total votes	57,908	100.00%

A referendum on electoral reform was held in Botswana on 27 October 1987, the first time a referendum had been held in the country. The proposal involved the creation of the post of Supervisor of Elections, which would be appointed by the government. The referendum was passed with 78.1% of voters in favour.

Following the referendum, the next general elections, held in 1989, were boycotted by the Botswana National Front because the reforms did not provide for an independent electoral commission. The changes were reversed following another referendum in 1997.

== Results ==
Choice	Votes	%
For	45,227	78.1
Against	12,681	21.9
Invalid/blank votes		–
Total	57,908	100
Registered voters/turnout		
Source: African Elections Database
