= Sophie Pedder =

British journalist and author

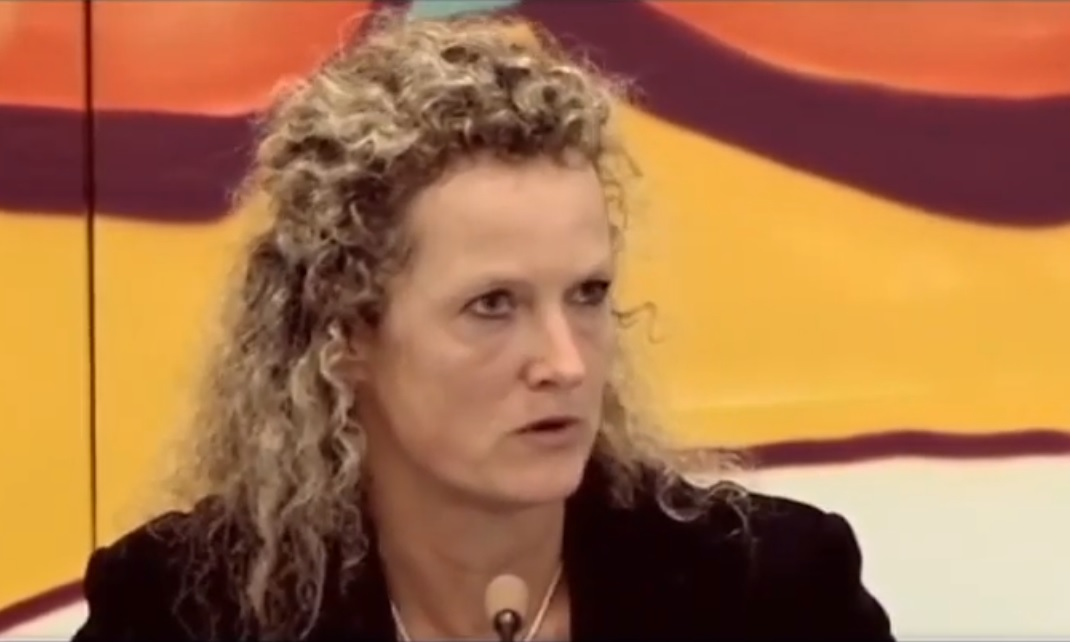
- Born: 1967
- Education: University of Oxford, University of Chicago
- Occupation: Journalist
- Awards: David Watt Prize (2006); Knight of the National Order of Merit (2022)

Sophie Pedder is a British journalist and author, who is Paris bureau chief for The Economist and a specialist on France. She is a biographer of French President Emmanuel Macron.

Born in London, she obtained a first-class degree at the University of Oxford (St John's College) and a MA at the University of Chicago, where she was a post-graduate Fulbright scholar. Before working for The Economist, Pedder was a research assistant for Professor William Julius Wilson at the University of Chicago’s Urban Poverty and Family Life project. She joined The Economist in 1990. Following a spell as correspondent in South Africa from 1994 to 1997, when she covered the end of apartheid, Pedder returned to write about European politics from London and became the Paris bureau chief in 2003. She has also collaborated as political commentator for BBC and CNN, and has written for Prospect, Foreign Affairs, Le Monde, Paris-Match and Le Figaro, among other media outlets.

It was in Pedder's interview with Emmanuel Macron for The Economist on 7 November 2019 that he declared the "brain death" of NATO, a phrase that stirred global political controversy.

Her biography of the French president, Revolution Française: Emmanuel Macron and the quest to reinvent a nation, was described by The Wall Street Journal as "a terrific first draft of a history with significance far beyond the borders of France."

== Awards ==
- David Watt Prize (2006) - For her article "Spot the difference" on French anti-americanism, published in The Economist on 24 December 2005.

== Works ==
- Pedder, Sophie (2007). Blairkozy ou Ségoblair?. Michalon.
- Pedder, Sophie (2012). Le déni français: Les derniers enfants gâtés de l'Europe. JC Lattès.
- Pedder, Sophie (2018). Emmanuel Macron and the Quest to Reinvent a Nation. Bloomsbury Continuum.
