= Seepapitso IV =

Motswana diplomat (1933–2010)

Kgosi Seepapitso IV born 17 October 1933, was a chief of the Ngwaketse tribe of Botswana. He was the son of Chief Bathoen II. He obtained chieftainship in 1966 taking after his father. He continued to reign as paramount chief of Bangwaketse till he died on 24 March 2010. He was succeeded by his 4 children, grandchildren and his wife.

Kgosi Seepapitso IV was described as loving, under whose leadership Bangwaketse thrived and became successful. "He was a very principled man who never shied away from speaking out to defend what he believed in. He was the custodian of Botswana and Bangwaketse culture, and he repeatedly called for the preservation of Bogosi. His passing is a great loss to Bangwaketse and to the country as a whole", said Kwenantle Gaseitsewe.

Kgosi Seepapitso IV also led the House of Chiefs for over 24 years having won the elections unopposed as Chairman of the house in 2005. He served as the ambassador to the United States and later as Botswana's ambassador to China. Kgosi Seepapitso IV served government in various capacities including being a town clerk in Gaborone. Under his regiment, members were awarded gold medals during the Awards of Tribal Leaders by Leading Age Foundation.
