= Sophie Moleta =

- Born: Wellington, New Zealand
- Genre: Folk pop
- Occupations: Musician, teacher
- Instruments: Vocals, piano
- Years active: 1992–present
- Label: BMG
- Website: sophiemoleta.com

Sophie Moleta is a New Zealand-Australian singer, songwriter, composer and teacher with an intimate singing style. She provides folk pop with piano-backed vocals and also covers other genres from dance and house music, electronic ambient to laid back jazz.

Moleta was born in Wellington, New Zealand, but had moved to Perth, Western Australia early 1970s. Her father, Vincent Bartolo Moleta (born 1939), was a writer, publisher and historian, who retired in 2000 and her mother, classical accompanist was Christine Oakley (1939–1989). From the age of four she received classical music lessons from her mother. Moleta's non-classical music career started with a local Perth punk band, the Brautigans as backup vocalist and drummer.

Two of Moleta's tracks, "Can You" and "111 Taranaki St", are included on the Various Artists' compilation album, Runner: A Compilation of New Zealand Music (1994). Joshua Glazer of AllMusic described her "haunting piano and whispered vocals". Her early album, Trust, was self published. She relocated to France in 1999. For her next album, Dive (2000), the artist worked with French producer Hector Zazou, who recorded it at Peter Gabriel's Real World Studios. Correspondent for De Morgen compared her to Tori Amos, "Moleta's music sounds more minimalistic and the expressive capacity of her voice is clearly smaller" and found that her singing "is rarely accompanied by more than one instrument and in 'Geneva' and 'Fresh Rain' vocally goes so over the top that it makes your teeth grind." Whereas with "'10 x 2', 'Chapelle' or the thin title track, this lady effortlessly gets you captivated."

Moleta was residing in Brighton, England and Jersey by 2000. She collaborated with trance group, Human Movement to issue a single, "Love Has Come Again" (2000). In 2003 she returned to Wellington, New Zealand and by 2007 was back in Perth, Australia.

== Discography ==
Albums except as noted

- Stoop Only to Love (1996)
- Trust (1998)
- Dive (2000)
- The Cowshed Session (2000)
- Live in Lille (France) (October 2000) Sofa
- "Love Has Come Again" by Human Movement featuring Sophie Moleta (2000) single
- Les Jolies Choses (2001) (two tracks - film soundtrack & soundtrack album)
- Temple (2001)
- Grow in Love (2001)
- Accept (2002)
- My Style of Sensual (2003) Sofa
- What Happened in Fremantle? (2004) (with David Härenstam)
- Untie Me (2005) (with Holmes Ives)
- Live at LaSalle (Singapore) (2005)
- "Te-Atawhai" (3 track single) (2006) and separate video/DVD of the title track
- "Awaken" (2006) original track from Untie Me in nine remix versions
- Every Girl I Know Deserves a Packet of Stars (2007) (14 tracks + video)
- SatyaKadambiiMela-"Truth is"( 2012)

The birth of Love ep released on band camp October 2015
