= Rolong =

African ethnic group

Total population
- 58,885 (2022, census)

Languages
- Setswana

Religion
- Christianity, Traditional African religions

Related ethnic groups
- Babolaongwe, Bakaa, Bakgalagadi, Bakgothu, Bakubung, Bakgwatheng, Bapulana, Bangologa, Batlhaping, Nama

The Rolong (pronounced /ˈrɒlɒŋ/; also known as the Barolong) are a Batswana people principal tribe native to Botswana, Namibia, Lesotho, and South Africa.

== Etymology ==
The Rolong people's name originated from the clan's first kgosi (king, chief) Morolong, who lived around 1270–1280. The ancient word rola, meaning metal forging and hammering, is believed to be the origin of Morolong's name.

== History ==
=== Origins ===
Most Batswana people can trace their roots back to the Barolong, first recorded in 1150. In 1300, the Rolong were located in the southwestern Transvaal; then, in 1400, they moved south and settled between the Molopo and Vaal Rivers.

In 1450, a small group within the Barolong, took it upon themselves to travel northwest into Botswana. The remaining Barolong responded with "Ba ka ya" ("They can depart"), and from this statement the travelling group became an established branch now referred as the Bakaa. Not long after, a second group separated themselves from the Barolong, albeit not travelling along the same path as the Bakaa, and established themselves as the Bakgwatheng in Molepolole by 1500.

=== Colonialism and evangelicalism ===
In the early 1800s, European and American evangelicals organized missionary societies to travel and spread the word of the Bible, as well as to rid the Rolong of their customs that disagreed with their own religious beliefs, such as the paying of dowries, polygamy, rain-making rituals, and adolescent initiation schools. The London Missionary Society (LMS), formed in 1795, and notable member Robert Moffat had a significant impact on the Rolong society, specifically on education, trade and economy, and written language.

=== Barolong Farms ===
The "Barolong Farms" referred to the land situated between the territories of the Bangwaketse and the Barolong until the late 1800s when the latter two clans attempted to claim ownership over it, consequently leading it to become a topic of conflict when the Bechuanaland Protectorate was established in 1885. With assertions of ownership over the territory coming from the numerous Sotho-Tswana clans and the Boers, establishing who had ownership of the land proved difficult.

As a means of resolving the issue, Barolong Chief Montshiwa proposed that the land be used only for agriculture and subsequently allocated to individuals who have the right to own land. Although the Barolong gained legal ownership of the land in 1892, the Bechuanaland Land Commission believed communal land ownership was preferable, as the native people were deemed unprepared for individual land ownership. Following extensive negotiations with the Land Commission, the forty-one plots of farmland were leased to the high-ranking members of the chiefdom (typically the family of the kgosi), who would then be responsible for allocating them.

=== Population history ===
==== 1880s ====
Polygamy, famine, and disease made it difficult to get an accurate population count of the Rolong, as Claude Reignier Conder reported in his 1887 study; these factors led to significant and unpredictable fluctuations in population. In the end, a rough estimate of 15,000 Rolong in Bechuanaland was recorded.

==== 1936 census ====
22,000 Rolong were recorded in the 1936 census as being under the rule of Chief Lotlamoreng Montshiwa, whilst an additional 8,000 were noted to be living in the central village of Mafikeng. These numbers, however, are not concrete as more than 7,000 Rolong natives were not present during the count, which has been attributed to attending school, tending to labour tasks, and visiting relatives.

==== 2022 census ====
58,855 Rolong are recorded in the 2022 Botswana census, with 28,861 being men and 30,024 being women.

== Society ==
=== Government ===
==== 19th century ====
In his 1887 report, Conder observed that the Rolong's morafe, their form of government, was similar to a constitutional monarchy. A counsellor and the head of the local council, two representatives appointed by the kgosi, serve each village and district.

=== Social hierarchy ===
==== 19th century ====
The Rolong social structure mirrors that of other SeTswana groups, a hierarchy based on wealth, from richest to poorest. “The royals,” as they are sometimes called, comprise the kgosi, his family, and his chosen representatives, making up the wealthiest class. They live within the main village, own herds of oxen, and have their wagons driven by servants. The agricultural population follows the wealthy; in addition to having the privilege of living in the main village, they also participate directly in trade and the production of goods. The herders are the second lowest class in the Rolong social hierarchy, and they are responsible for patrolling cattle posts in the main village. The Makalahari are the least powerful and most impoverished. They are historically known as nomadic hunters who live west of the main village.

==== 20th century ====
European evangelicals had a part in redefining the Rolong's social hierarchy in the early 1940s. Whilst wealth and influence continued to play a role, whether one is educated, possesses European valuables, or follows traditional Rolong customs became the deciding factors of one’s social class.

== Economy and trade ==
SeTswana clans, such as the Rolong, Griqua, and Batlhaping, traded long before Europeans visited Botswana. Molepolole, Lake Ngami, and the Orange River were popular trading routes. Trading between clans was frequent, but interactions with groups outside the continent were uncommon; however, beads, cloth, and seashells were sought when the opportunity to trade with non-neighbouring societies arose. Iron and copper tools, hematite, furs, tobacco, dogs, iron ore, and ivory were common trade goods.

== Agriculture and hunting ==
=== Agriculture ===
In 1960, the Botswana government encouraged the construction and use of a grinding mill. This resulted in increased crop production in Rolong farms.

=== Hunting ===
Although familial and solo hunts were permitted, the ‘‘kgosi’’ had the authority to initiate an organized hunt with specific groups. Such hunts were mandatory, as they were typically held prior to an impending battle increase morale, and those who did not participate were threatened with punishment or death. Circling and killing large herds of game was the goal of these organized group hunts. The ‘‘kgosi’’ were often responsible for distributing the animals killed on the hunt.

However, these hunts were not always intended to kill animals. To avoid a public execution, the kgosi and khuduthamaga (secret advisers) would use these hunts to lure and kill whomever they wanted.

== Education ==
=== Missionary schools ===
The London Missionary Society established the majority of Botswana's early schools. Reading, writing, and scripture were incorporated into the early curriculum. By the 1860s, when major villages and towns had active schools, students were taught a variety of subjects such as arithmetic, Setswana, history, geography, and home economics (only girls were permitted to attend this class). Education was initially limited to royalty and other families of influence due to fees, making it unaffordable for the poor. Although money was given by Tswana families for admission, the quality of education and teachers was poor due to the lack of funding on the part of the missionary societies.

Not every Tswana family, however, supported the opening of these missionary schools, because children were expected to complete domestic and agricultural tasks during the day. For example, boys were expected to care for cattle at their assigned posts during the day. To address this issue, missionaries experimented with the concept of "cattle post schools," in which these boys were expected to read books and teach each other at their posts. Naturally, this plan failed because the posts were too far apart and no teacher was available to supervise the boys. Similarly, many girls could not attend school during the ploughing and harvesting seasons because they needed to work on the farms. Ultimately, girls attended missionary schools at a higher rate than boys.

=== Initiation school ===
When Sotho-Tswana adolescents reached the age of sixteen, they were required to attend initiation schools known as bogwera for boys and bojale for girls. These schools, which were popular among the Rolong before the Union of South Africa in 1910, were held every four to five years and lasted about five months.

The boys' bogwera program, led by the chief's son, took place in an isolated area. They were circumcised and taught the clan's laws, customs, and history. At the end of the initiation, the boys were organized into a mophato (regiment) and given a name. These regiments were expected to be ready at all times to carry out the tasks assigned to them, which included hunting, raiding cattle, clearing land, and entertaining. The girls' bojale program is shorter and less arduous. By the end, the girls formed a regiment similar to the boys, through their expectations differed.

Similar regiments still exist as of 1940, but initiations are no longer common. Admission to these schools is at the discretion of the current chief, who judges boys and girls based on whether they would have qualified for membership in the regiment before initiations went out of practice. Men and women who underwent initiation as children were observed to receive more respect than those who did not.

== Culture ==
=== Art and architecture ===
Pottery discovered in southeast Botswana between the years 500 and 600 has been attributed to the Rolong and Bakgalagadi. Many pottery pieces feature a herringbone pattern around the neck and thick rims.

In the 1880s, Conder observed that Rolong huts were significantly better in quality than Batlaping huts. The former's huts were made up of strong mudwalls and sun-dried bricks covered in red mortar.

=== Language ===
The Serolong dialect is spoken by the four Rolong clan divisions: the Tshidi, the Seleka, the Rapulana, and the Ratlou.

=== Religion ===
Many of the Rolong's religious practices were diminished by evangelical missionaries. Clan chiefs in Botswana did not embrace the emergence of Christianity because the shift in values and beliefs started to cause conflict in political discussions. Some of these chiefs' concerns about the abrupt changes were alleviated temporarily by an increase in churches founded by their people, who were dissatisfied with the fact that they were not permitted to hold high-ranking positions in missionary-run churches. However, these churches were rarely attended because most people preferred those run by the London Missionary Society.

=== Marriage ===
Marriage is very important in Rolong society, as it involves both the individuals' families and the rest of the clan. Men and women who do not marry in their lifetime are referred to as lefetwa ("one who has been passed by") and are not considered "fully grown up" or to have a "physical, mental, or moral defect".

==== Types of marriages ====
It is not rare for a man to marry one of his father's widows, as the heir—the first son—is the protector of his father's widows, which can lead to the formation of a close bond. This relationship is explained by the phrase: "Mosimane, nyala mmago, o itsalêlê bo-monnawo." ("Son, marry your mother and beget yourself younger brothers and sisters."). This implies that any children born out of this marriage would be regarded as the son's deceased father's children.

The Rolong do not practice child marriage. Although infants and unborn children can be betrothed, anyone who does not complete puberty for whatever reason is considered "incompetent" to marry.

==== Bogadi ====
Bogadi, also known as dowry, is a mandatory payment of cattle expected by the woman's family to be made at some point in a man's life, and is required for marriage validation. While the couple is permitted to have a wedding and marry each other on paper before the bogadi is issued, this does not indicate the validity of the marriage, as perceived by the involved families. If a marriage is annulled, the bogadi will not be returned, according to the saying, "Bogadi ga bo boe." ("Bogadi does not return.").

== See also ==
- List of Rolong rulers
- List of Sotho-Tswana clans
