= List of rulers of Tawana =

This is a list of the Rulers of baTawana, a territory in the present-day northern half of Botswana, formerly part of the Bechuanaland Protectorate.

Kgôsikgolo = Paramount Chief

Tenure	Incumbent	Notes
1795 to 1820	Tawana a Mathiba Mpuru, Kgôsikgolo	
1820 to 1828	Morêmi I a Tawana Kgôsikgolo	
1828 to 1840	Sedumedi a Morêmi, acting Kgôsikgolo	
1840 to 1847	Mogalakwe a Tawana, acting Kgôsikgolo	
1847 to 1874	Letsholathêbê I a Morêmi, Kgôsikgolo	
1875 to 1876	Mênô a Moremi, acting Kgôsikgolo	
1876 to 1876	Dithapô a Mênô, acting Kgôsikgolo	1st Term
1876 to 4 November 1890	Morêmi II a Letsholathêbê, Kgôsikgolo	
1890 to 1891	Dithapô a Mênô, acting Kgôsikgolo	2nd Term
1891 to 1906	Sekgoma a Letsholathêbê, acting Kgôsikgolo	Pretending to be kgôsikgolo
1906 to 1906	Sekgathôlê a Letsholathêbê, acting Kgôsikgolo	
1906 to 1932	Mathiba a Morêmi, Kgôsikgolo	
1932 to 1934	Monaamaburu a Letsholathêbê, acting Kgôsikgolo	
1934 to 1936	Dibolayang a Weetshoetsile, acting Kgôsikgolo	
1936 to 1937	Gaetsalloe a Morêmi, acting Kgôsikgolo	The father to Barati, and Barati is the father to Joseph William B.
1937 to 1946	Morêmi III a Mathiba Mawelawela, Kgôsikgolo	
1947 to 1958	Elizabeth Pulane Moremi, acting Kgôsikgolo ♀	Also known as Dulano Seezo.
1958 to 1981	Letsholathêbê II a Morêmi, Kgôsikgolo	
1981 to 1995	Mathiba a Morêmi, acting Kgôsikgolo	
1995 to August 2003	Tawana II Moremi a Letsholathêbê, Kgôsikgolo	
28 January 2004 to present	Kealitile Moremi, Regent	

== See also ==
- Botswana
  - Heads of state of Botswana
  - Heads of government of Botswana
  - List of commissioners of Bechuanaland
    - Rulers of baKgatla
    - Rulers of baKwêna
    - Rulers of Balete (baMalete)
    - Rulers of baNgwaketse
    - Rulers of Bangwato (bamaNgwato)
    - Rulers of baRôlông
    - Rulers of baTlôkwa
- Lists of office-holders
