= Bangwaketse =

Tribe in Botswana

- Location within Botswana
- Coordinates: 24°59′S 25°21′E
- Country: Botswana
- Time zone: UTC+2 (Central Africa Time)
  - Summer (DST): UTC+2 (not observed)

The Bangwaketse (also known as the BaNgwaketse, or Ngwaketse) are one of the eight principal tribes in Botswana, and are ethnic Tswana. (The "Ba" or "Bo" prefix in African tribal names in Setswana means "people of" or "people who speak". "Ma" means "person of".) Kanye is the original Bangwaketse village located in the Southern District settled in 1853, originally called Ntsweng Hill. The king of the tribe is King Malope II, son of Seepapitso IV. The Bangwaketse people live in the arid mountainous region of Southern Botswana mentioned in the book Cherub: Guardian Angel. It is bordered by Moshupa, Lobatse, and Jwaneng, and it is a 45-minute drive from Gaborone, the capital city of Botswana. The village is served by Kanye Airport.

A documentary on the Bangwaketse royal family was filmed in 2003–2005: "The Queen's Courtyard".

== Villages ==
Population 2022	Total	Male	Female
Ngwaketse	140,296	67,909	72,387
Village Kanye	48,028	22,273	25,755
Village Ranaka	3,207	1,489	1,718
Village Lotlhakane West	2,056	944	1,112
Village Gasita	1,188	561	627
Village Lorolwana	2,225	1,007	1,218
Village Kgomokasitwa	1,669	823	846
Village Pitseng	1,526	704	822
Village Lekgolobotlo	1,334	639	695
Village Seherelela	884	403	481
Village Lotlhakane	6,045	2,751	3,294
Village Sese	6,798	3,469	3,329
Village Sesung	1,006	483	523
Village Magotlhwane	1,751	845	906
Village Segwagwa	1,008	479	529
Village Manyana	3,750	1,763	1,987
Village Dipotsana	113	67	46
Village Diabo	261	116	145
Village Molapowabojang	8,722	4,024	4,698
Village Ralekgetho	554	250	304
Village Moshaneng	1,961	906	1,055
Village Moshupa	23,858	11,097	12,761
Village Ntlhantlhe	2,842	1,326	1,516
Village Tshwaane	193	89	104
Village Selokolela	1,750	766	984
Village Mogonye	1,081	514	567
Village Betesankwe	507	255	252
Village Gathwane	1,099	528	571
Village Digawana	4,356	2,033	2,323
Village Magoriapitse	1,048	482	566
Village Lejwana	829	393	436
Village Mogojogojo	981	477	504
Village Mmathethe	5,421	2,445	2,976
Village Mokgomane	847	397	450
Village Digawana	4,356	2,033	2,323
Village Magoriapitse	1,048	482	566
Village Lejwana	829	393	436
Village Mogojogojo	981	477	504
Village Mmathethe	5,421	2,445	2,976
Village Mokgomane	847	397	450

== Notable people ==
- Kgosi Malope - Kgosi Kgolo of Bangwaketse Malope II
- Kgosi Seepapitso IV - The late Kgosi Kgolo of Bangwaketse Seepapitso III
- Quett Masire – former President of Botswana
- Bathoen Gaseitsiwe – Kgosi of the BaNgwaketse and Leader of the Opposition in the National Assembly
- Archibald Mogwe – former Botswana foreign minister and former Ambassador.
- Mpule Kwelagobe – investor, businesswoman, model and beauty queen from Gaborone, Botswana who was crowned Miss Universe in May 1999.

== See also ==
- List of rulers of the Bangwaketse
