= Kgosi =

Hereditary leader of a Batswana tribe

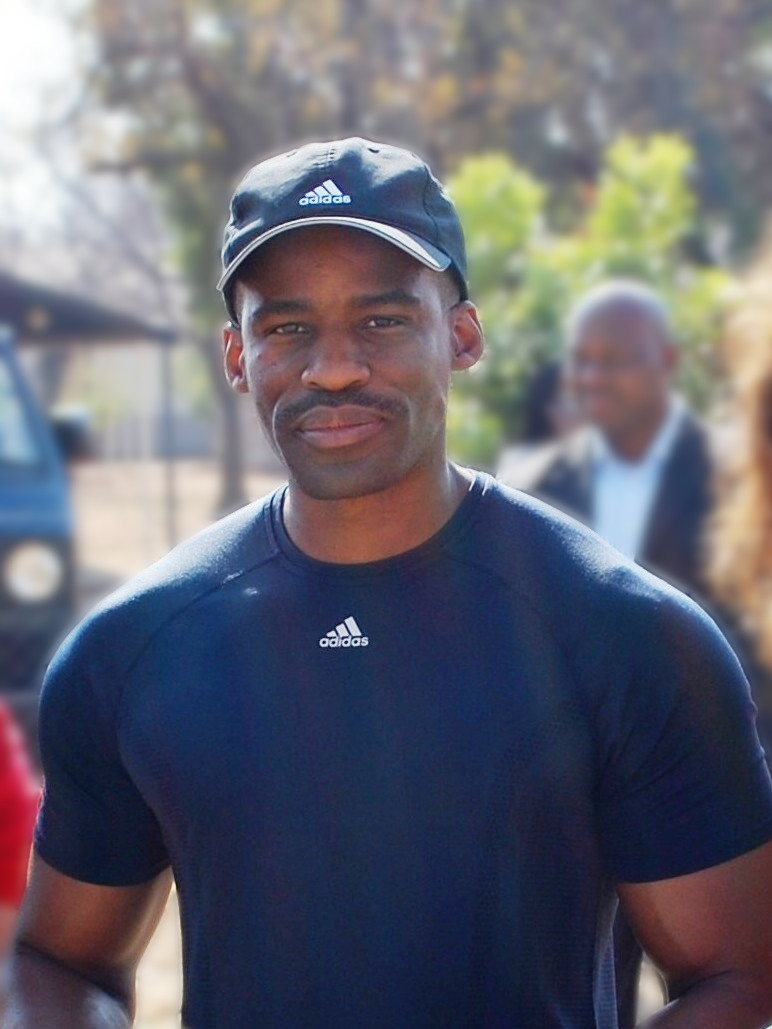
Kgosi Leruo Tshekedi Molotlegi, king of the Royal Bafokeng Nation

Kgosi (/ˈkoʊsi/; Tswana pronunciation: [ˈkχʊ.si]) is the title for a hereditary leader of a Batswana and South Africa peoples tribe.

== Usage ==
The word "kgosi" is a Setswana term for "king" or "chief". Various affixes can be added to the word to change its meaning: adding the prefix di- creates the plural form dikgosi; the feminine suffix -gadi makes the word kgosigadi; and the adjectival suffix -kgolo, meaning "large", creates kgosikgolo, the word for "supreme leader".

It is a title often given to aristocrats in Botswana and surrounding countries where there are Tswana speaking people. The office of tribal leadership is called the bogosi while the person who assumes the office is the kgosi.

== Duties ==
The Bogosi Act of 2008 defines the powers of the kgosis. According to the Bogosi Act, the kgosi of a tribe has several duties: to manage the tribe, to organize kgotla meetings, and to follow the rules and advice of the national government and the members of the tribe. The kgosis of the eight main Batswana tribes automatically become members of the Ntlo ya Dikgosi, an advisory body within the Parliament of Botswana.

The kgosi has the ability to appoint a mothusa kgosi who acts as an acting leader while the kgosi is temporarily unable to perform his or her duties. This is different from the motshwarelela bogosi, an office created when the kgosi is permanently unable to perform his or her duties and a replacement kgosi is needed.

The act has been criticised by tribal leaders because of the limitations on the powers of a kgosi. In 2010, Kgosi Kgafela II of the Kgatla tribe was accused of flogging, but he argued that kgosis have immunity to the state's jurisdiction. The Botswana High Court dismissed the case on 11 May 2011, claiming that "dikgosi cannot act outside the constitution and laws prescribed by Parliament when all other functionaries of the state act within the statutory limitations." To avoid the legal costs of the case, Kgafela moved to Moruleng, South Africa.
