= History of Southern Africa =

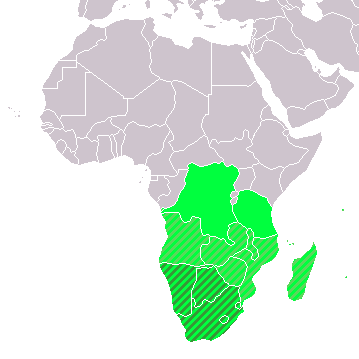
Map of Southern Africa: Dark Green: Southern Africa (UN subregion) Green: Geographic, including above Light Green: Southern African Development Community (SADC)

The history of Southern Africa has been divided into its prehistory, its ancient history, the major polities flourishing, the colonial period, and the post-colonial period, in which the current nations were formed. Southern Africa is bordered by Central Africa, East Africa, the Atlantic Ocean, the Indian Ocean, and the Sahara Desert. Colonial boundaries are reflected in the modern boundaries between contemporary Southern African states, cutting across ethnic and cultural lines, often dividing single ethnic groups between two or more states.

== Geography ==
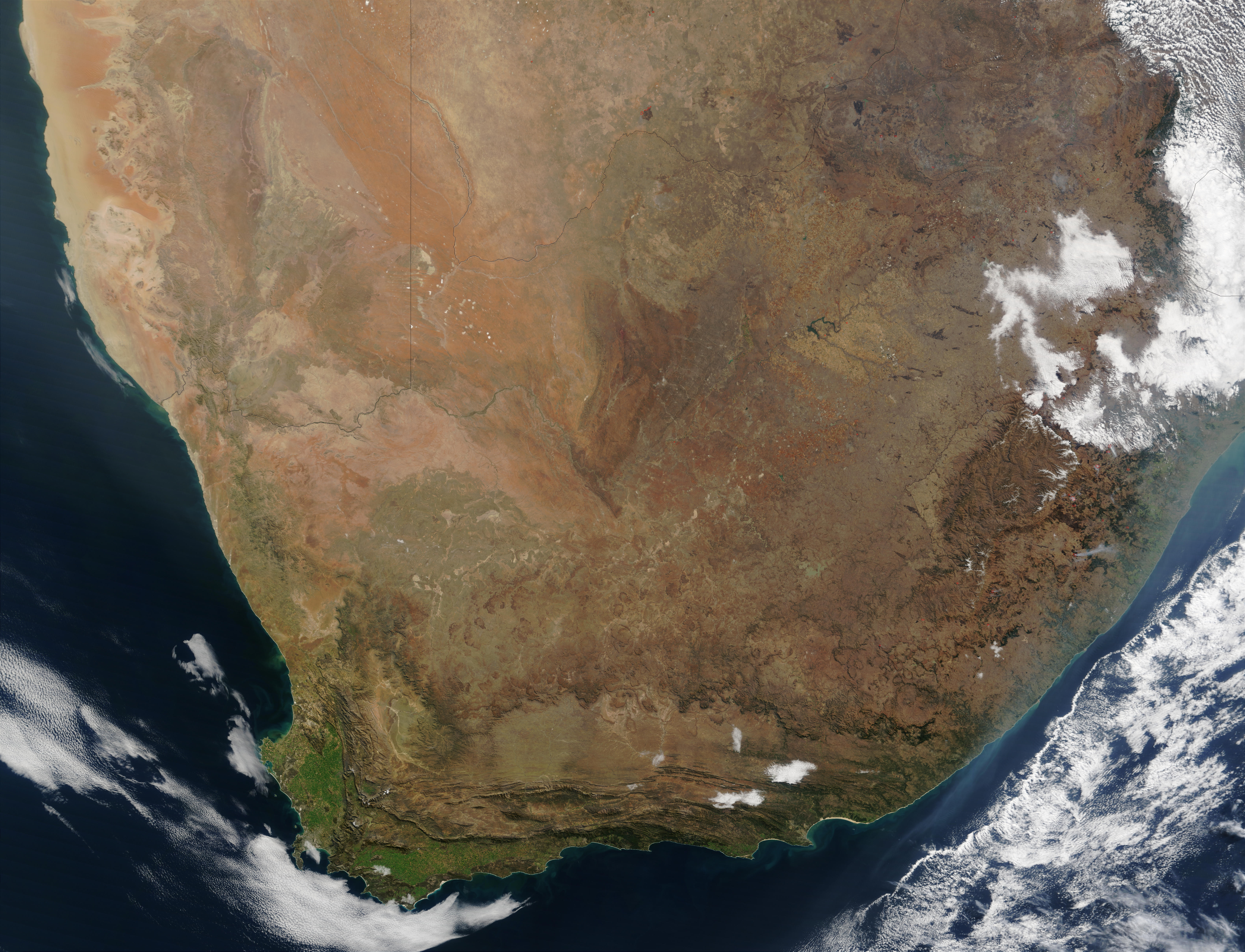
Satellite imagery of Southern Africa.

The area located at the south of the desert is a steppe, a semi-arid region, called the Sahel. It is the ecoclimatic and biogeographic zone of transition in Africa between the Sahara desert to the north and the Sudanian Savanna to the south. The Sudanian Savanna is a broad belt of tropical savanna that spans the African continent, from the Atlantic Ocean coast in the West Sudanian savanna to the Ethiopian Highlands in the East Sudanian savanna.

== Climate ==
In 15,000 BP, the West African Monsoon transformed the landscape of Africa and began the Green Sahara period; greater rainfall during the summer season resulted in the growth of humid conditions (e.g., lakes, wetlands) and the savanna (e.g., grassland, shrubland) in North Africa. Between 5500 BP and 4000 BP, the Green Sahara period ended.

== Prehistory ==
By at least 170,000 BP, amid the Middle Stone Age, Southern Africans cooked and ate Hypoxis angustifolia rhizomes at Border Cave, South Africa, which may have provided carbohydrates for their migratory activities.

In 92,000 BP, amid the Middle Stone Age, Malawian foragers utilized fire to influence and alter their surrounding environment.

Between 65,000 BP and 37,000 BP, amid the Middle to Late Stone Age, Southern Africans developed the bow and arrow.

== Ancient history ==
=== Bantu expansion ===
Bantu-speaking peoples migrated, along with their ceramics, from West Africa into other areas of Sub-Saharan Africa. The Kalundu ceramic type may have spread into Southeastern Africa. Additionally, the Eastern African Urewe ceramic type of Lake Victoria may have spread, via African shores near the Indian Ocean, as the Kwale ceramic type, and spread, via Zimbabwe, Zambia, and Malawi, as the Nkope ceramic type.

Though some may have been created later, the earlier red finger-painted rock art may have been created between 6000 BP and 1800 BP, to the south of Kei River and Orange River by Khoisan hunter-gatherer-herders, in Malawi and Zambia by considerably dark-skinned, occasionally bearded, bow-and-arrow-wielding Akafula hunter-gatherers who resided in Malawi until 19th century CE, and in Transvaal by the Vhangona people.

Bantu-speaking farmers, or their Proto-Bantu progenitors, created the later white finger-painted rock art in some areas of Tanzania, Malawi, Angola, Zambia, and Zimbabwe, as well as in the northern regions of Mozambique, Botswana, and Transvaal. The Transvaal (e.g., Soutpansberg, Waterberg) rock art was specifically created by Sotho-speakers (e.g., Birwa, Koni, Tlokwa) and Venda people. Concentric circles, stylized humans, stylized animals, ox-wagons, saurian figures, Depictions of crocodiles and snakes were included in the white finger-painted rock art tradition, both of which were associated with rainmaking and crocodiles in particular, were also associated with fertility. The white finger-painted rock art may have been created for reasons relating to initiation rites and puberty rituals. Depictions from the rock art tradition of Bantu-speaking farmers have been found on divination-related items (e.g., drums, initiation figurines, initiation masks); fertility terracotta masks from Transvaal have been dated to the 1st millennium CE. Along with Iron Age archaeological sites from the 1st millennium CE, this indicates that white finger-painted rock art tradition may have been spanned from the Early Iron Age to the Later Iron Age.

== Post-classical history ==
=== Kingdom of Mapungubwe ===
The largest settlement from what has been dubbed the Leopard's Kopje culture is known as the K2 culture and was the immediate predecessor to the settlement of Mapungubwe. The people of the K2 culture, probably derived from the ancestors of the Shona and Kalanga people of southern Africa, was attracted to the Shashi-Limpopo area, likely because it provided mixed agricultural possibilities. The area was also prime elephant country, providing access to valuable ivory. The control of the gold and ivory trade greatly increased the political power of the K2 culture. By 1075 CE, the population of K2 had outgrown the area and relocated to Mapungubwe Hill.

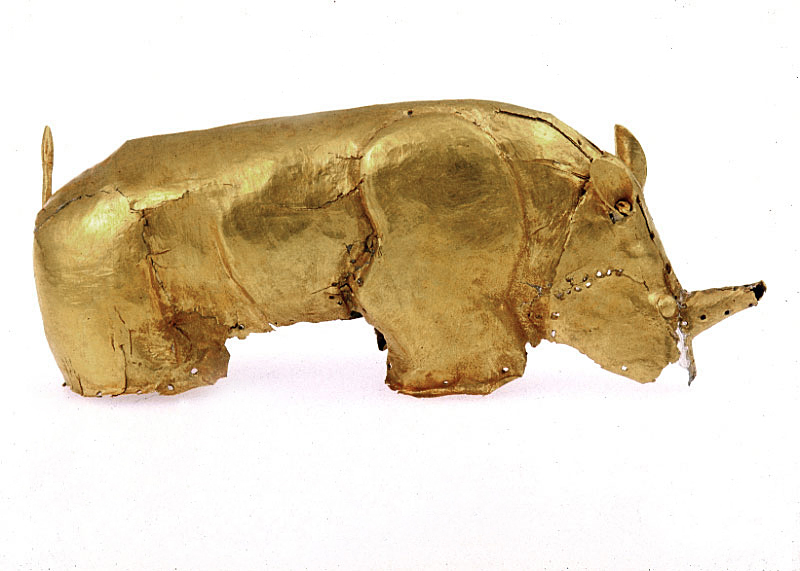
The Golden Rhinoceros of Mapungubwe

=== Kingdom of Zimbabwe ===
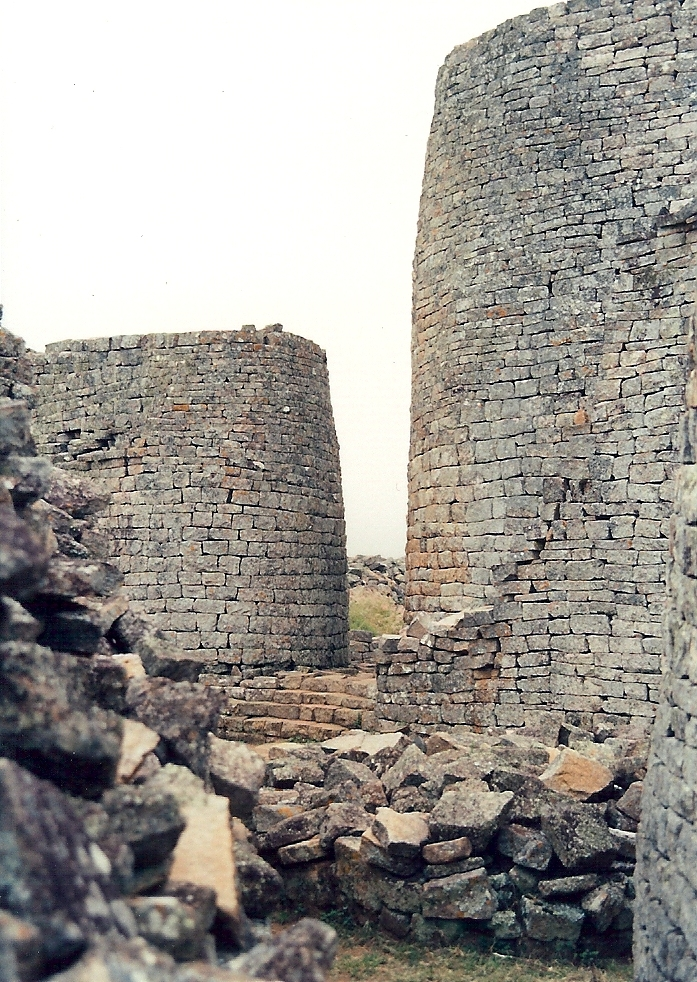
Towers of Great Zimbabwe

The kingdom taxed other rulers throughout the region. The kingdom was composed of over 150 tributaries headquartered in their own minor zimbabwes.

=== Kingdom of Mutapa ===
Mutota's son and successor, Nyanhewe Matope, extended this new kingdom into an empire encompassing most of the lands between Tavara and the Indian Ocean. This empire had achieved uniting a number of different peoples in Southern Africa by building strong, well-trained armies and encouraging states to join voluntarily, offering membership in the Great council of the Empire to any who joined without resistance. Matope's armies overran the kingdom of the Manyika as well as the coastal kingdoms of Kiteve and Madanda. By the time the Portuguese arrived on the coast of Mozambique, the Mutapa Kingdom was the premier state in the region. He raised a strong army which conquered the Dande area of the Tonga and Tavara. The empire had reached its full extent by the year 1480 CE a mere 50 years following its creation.

=== Kingdom of Butua ===
Prior to becoming a part of the Rozwi kingdom, the Togwa dynasty ruled the kingdom of Butua until 1683 CE.

=== Kingdom of Maravi ===
Between the 16th century CE and the 19th century CE, the kingdoms of Maravi (e.g., Undi, Lundu, Kalonga) prospered.

== Modern history ==
=== Merina Kingdom ===
By the early 19th century CE, the Merina were able to overcome rival tribes such as the Bezanozano, the Betsimisaraka, and eventually the Sakalava kingdom and bring them under the Merina crown. It is through this process that the ethnonym "Merina" began to be commonly used, as it denotes prominence in the Malagasy language. Though some sources describe the Merina expansion as the unification of Madagascar, this period of Merina expansion was seen by neighboring tribes such as the Betsimisaraka as aggressive acts of colonialism. By 1824 CE, the Merina captured the port of Mahajanga situated on the western coast of the island marking a further expansion of power. Under Radama I, the Merina continued to launch military expeditions that expanded imperial control and enriched military chiefs. The ability of the Merina to overcome neighboring tribes was due to British firepower and military training. The British had an interest in establishing trade with the Merina kingdom due to its central position on the island since 1815 CE. Merina imperial expeditions became more frequent and violent after the renunciation of the second Merina-British treaty. Between 1828 CE and 1840 CE, more than 100,000 men were killed and more than 200,000 enslaved by Merina forces. Imperial rule was met with resistance from escaped slaves and other refugees from imperial rule numbering in the tens of thousands. These refugees formed raiding brigands that were dealt with by imperial troops who hunted them down in 1835 CE. Notably, the rate of escaping refugees only heightened the demand for slave labor in the Merina kingdom, further fueling campaigns of military expansion. Throughout the middle of the 19th century CE, continued imperial expansion and increasing control in coastal trade solidified Merina predominance over the island. The Merina kingdom nearly consolidated all of Madagascar into a single nation before French colonization in 1895 CE.

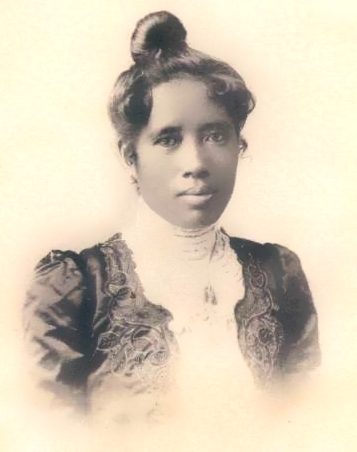
Ranavalona III was the last monarch of Madagascar.

=== Rozwi Empire ===
Records from the Portuguese show that the Rozvi were sophisticated military strategists. They were noted for using the cow-horn formation years before the great Zulu leader Shaka adopted it in the 19th century CE. Armed with spears, shields, bows and arrows, the aggressive Rozvi took over the Zimbabwe plateau.

=== Ndwandwe Kingdom ===
The kingdom of Ndwande developed in the 19th century CE due to various kinds of changes (e.g., socioeconomic, political).

=== Mthethwa Paramountcy ===
According to Muzi Mthethwa (1995), the Mthethwas are descended from the Nguni tribes of northern Natal and the Lubombo Mountains, whose modern identity dates back some 700 years. They are among the first Nguni-Tsonga groups who left the Great Lakes in Central Africa between 200 CE and 1200 CE. On arrival in Southern Africa, they settled around modern-day Swaziland, mainly on the Lubombo Mountains, before leaving in the 17th century CE to settle in modern-day KwaZulu-Natal, in the Nkandla region. It consisted of roughly 30 Nguni Chiefdoms, lineages, and clans. Unlike its successor, the Zulu Kingdom, the Mthethwa Paramountcy was a confederation. After Zulu prince Sigidi kaSenzagakhona (better known as Shaka Zulu) became king, he forged a nearly homogeneous nation with a single king (nkosi).

The Mthethwa Paramountcy was consolidated and extended under the rule of King of kings Dingiswayo. The King entered into an alliance with the Tsonga to the north in the early 19th century CE and began trading Ivory and other things with the Portuguese in Mozambique.

=== Zulu Kingdom ===
Shaka was the illegitimate son of Senzangakhona, King of the Zulus. He was born c. 1787 CE. He and his mother, Nandi, were exiled by Senzangakhona, and found refuge with the Mthethwa. Shaka fought as a warrior under Jobe, and then under Jobe's successor, Dingiswayo, leader of the Mthethwa Paramountcy. When Senzangakona died, Dingiswayo helped Shaka become chief of the Zulu Kingdom. After Dingiswayo's death at the hands of Zwide, king of the Ndwandwe, around 1818 CE, Shaka assumed leadership of the entire Mthethwa alliance.

Shaka initiated many military, social, cultural and political reforms, forming a well-organized and centralised Zulu state. The most important reforms involved the transformation of the army, through the innovative tactics and weapons, and a showdown with the spiritual leadership, witchdoctors, effectively ensuring the subservience of the "Zulu church" to the state.

The alliance under his leadership survived Zwide's first assault at the Battle of Gqokli Hill in 1818 CE. Within two years, Shaka had defeated Zwide at the Battle of Mhlatuze River in 1820 CE and broken up the Ndwandwe alliance, some of whom in turn began a murderous campaign against other Nguni tribes and clans, setting in motion what became known as Difaqane or Mfecane, a mass-migration of tribes fleeing the remnants of the Ndwandwe fleeing the Zulu. The death toll has never been satisfactorily determined, but the whole region became nearly depopulated. Normal estimates for the death toll during this period range from 1 million to 2 million people. These numbers are however controversial. By 1822 CE, Shaka had conquered an empire covering an area of around 80,000 square miles (210,000 km^{2}).

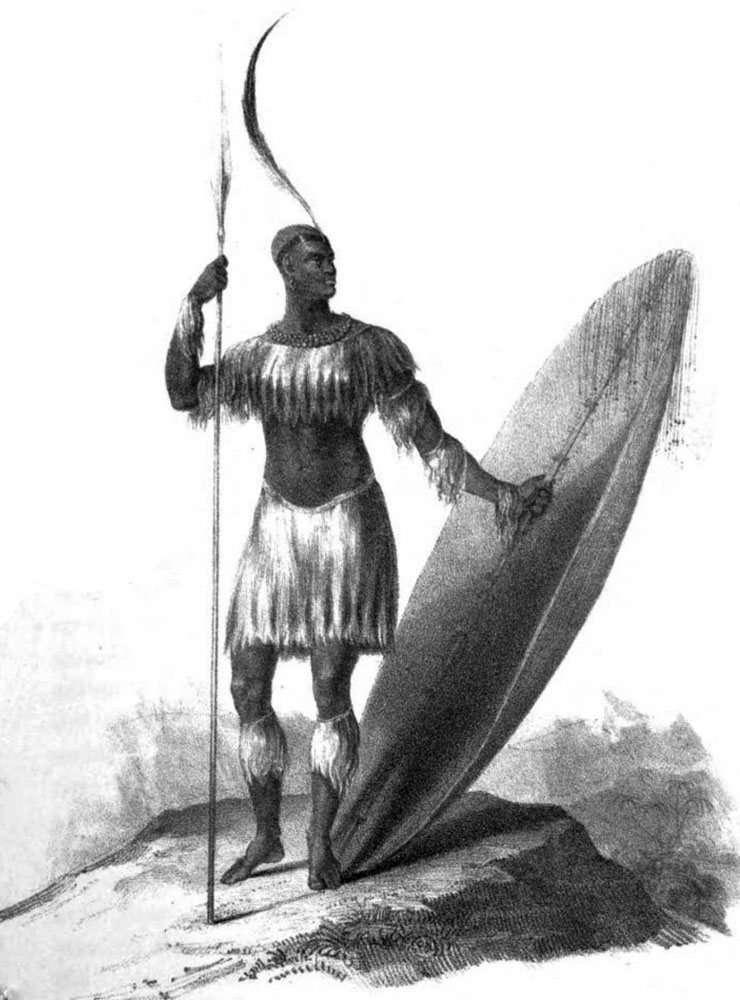
Drawing of King Shaka (c. 1824)

=== Kingdom of Mthwakazi ===
Mthwakazi is the traditional name of the proto-Ndebele people and Ndebele kingdom and is in the area of today's Zimbabwe. Mthwakazi is widely used to refer to inhabitants of Matebeleland Province in Zimbabwe.

=== Colonial period ===
In 1652 CE the Dutch East India Company established a colonial outpost close to the Cape of Good Hope with the intention of supporting the sea trade-rout between Europe and South East-Asia. The colony, Cape Town, would grow to become the Dutch Cape Colony. The Dutch colony was invaded twice by the British; first during the 1795 CE invasion of the Cape Colony that was part of the French Revolutionary Wars, and finally in 1806 CE during the Battle of Blaauwberg during the Napoleonic Wars. After the final invasion the colony became a British colony until the formation of the Union of South Africa in 1910 CE. The establishment of the Cape colony marked the beginning of the colonial period in Southern Africa and provided a springboard for the scramble for Africa in the 1880s and the establishment of the Boer Republics following the Great Trek in 1836 CE. This period saw the arrival of new peoples, technologies, plants and animals from around the world in the Southern Africa region and the decline of the pre-existing African kingdoms.

== History of Southern African Architecture ==
Further information in the sections of Architecture of Africa:

- Medieval Southern African Architecture

== History of science and technology in Southern Africa ==
Further information in the sections of History of science and technology in Africa:

- Astronomy
- Mathematics
- Medicine
- Agriculture
- Textiles
- Architecture
- Warfare
- By country

== Genetic history of Southern Africa ==
From the region of Kenya and Tanzania to South Africa, eastern Bantu-speaking Africans constitute a north to south genetic cline; additionally, from eastern Africa to toward southern Africa, evidence of genetic homogeneity is indicative of a serial founder effect and admixture events having occurred between Bantu-speaking Africans and other African populations by the time the Bantu migration had spanned into South Africa.

=== Archaic Human DNA ===
While Denisovan and Neanderthal ancestry in non-Africans outside of Africa are more certain, archaic human ancestry in Africans is less certain and is too early to be established with certainty.

=== Ancient DNA ===
Three Later Stone Age hunter-gatherers carried ancient DNA similar to Khoisan-speaking hunter-gatherers. Prior to the Bantu migration into the region, as evidenced by ancient DNA from Botswana, East African herders migrated into Southern Africa. Out of four Iron Age Bantu agriculturalists of West African origin, two earlier agriculturalists carried ancient DNA similar to Tsonga and Venda peoples and the two later agriculturalists carried ancient DNA similar to Nguni people; this indicates that there were various movements of peoples in the overall Bantu migration, which resulted in increased interaction and admixing between Bantu-speaking peoples and Khoisan-speaking peoples.

==== Botswana ====
At Nqoma, in Botswana, an individual, dated to the Early Iron Age (900 BP), carried haplogroup L2a1f.

At Taukome, in Botswana, an individual, dated to the Early Iron Age (1100 BP), carried haplogroups E1b1a1 (E-M2, E-Z1123) and L0d3b1.

At Xaro, in Botswana, there were two individuals, dated to the Early Iron Age (1400 BP); one carried haplogroups E1b1a1a1c1a and L3e1a2, and another carried haplogroups E1b1b1b2b (E-M293, E-CTS10880) and L0k1a2.

==== Malawi ====
===== Fingira =====
At Fingira rockshelter, in Malawi, an individual, dated between 6179 BP and 2341 BP, carried haplogroups B2 and L0d1.

At Fingira, in Malawi, an individual, estimated to date between 6175 BP and 5913 BP, carried haplogroups BT and L0d1b2b.

At Fingira, in Malawi, an individual, estimated to date between 6177 BP and 5923 BP, carried haplogroups BT and L0d1c.

At Fingira, in Malawi, an individual, estimated to date between 2676 BP and 2330 BP, carried haplogroup L0f.

===== Chencherere =====
At Chencherere, in Malawi, an individual, estimated to date between 5400 BP and 4800 BP, carried haplogroup L0k2.

At Chencherere, in Malawi, an individual, estimated to date between 5293 BP and 4979 BP, carried haplogroup L0k1.

===== Hora =====
At Hora 1 rockshelter, in Malawi, an individual, dated between 16,897 BP and 15,827 BP, carried haplogroups B2b and L5b.

At Hora 1 rockshelter, in Malawi, an individual, dated between 16,424 BP and 14,029 BP, carried haplogroups B2b1a2~ and L0d3/L0d3b.

At Hora, in Malawi, an individual, estimated to date between 10,000 BP and 5000 BP, carried haplogroups BT and L0k2.

At Hora, in Malawi, an individual, estimated to date between 8173 BP and 7957 BP, carried haplogroup L0a2.

==== South Africa ====
At Doonside, in South Africa, an individual, estimated to date between 2296 BP and 1910 BP, carried haplogroup L0d2.

At Champagne Castle, in South Africa, an individual, estimated to date between 448 BP and 282 BP, carried haplogroup L0d2a1a.

At Eland Cave, in South Africa, an individual, estimated to date between 533 BP and 453 BP, carried haplogroup L3e3b1.

At Mfongosi, in South Africa, an individual, estimated to date between 448 BP and 308 BP, carried haplogroup L3e1b2.

At Newcastle, in South Africa, an individual, estimated to date between 508 BP and 327 BP, carried haplogroup L3e2b1a2.

At St. Helena, in South Africa, an individual, estimated to date between 2241 BP and 1965 BP, carried haplogroups A1b1b2a and L0d2c1.

At Faraoskop Rock Shelter, in South Africa, an individual, estimated to date between 2017 BP and 1748 BP, carried haplogroups A1b1b2a and L0d1b2b1b.

At Kasteelberg, in South Africa, an individual, estimated to date between 1282 BP and 1069 BP, carried haplogroup L0d1a1a.

At Vaalkrans Shelter, in South Africa, an individual, estimated to date to 200 BP, is predominantly related to Khoisan speakers, partly related (15% - 32%) to East Africans, and carried haplogroups L0d3b1.

===== Ballito Bay =====
At Ballito Bay, in South Africa, an individual, estimated to date between 1986 BP and 1831 BP, carried haplogroups A1b1b2 and L0d2c1.

At Ballito Bay, in South Africa, an individual, estimated to date between 2149 BP and 1932 BP, carried haplogroups A1b1b2 and L0d2a1.

At Ballito Bay, South Africa, Ballito Boy, estimated to date 1,980 ± 20 cal BP, was found to have Rickettsia felis.

=== Y-Chromosomal DNA ===
Various Y chromosome studies show that the San carry some of the most divergent (oldest) human Y-chromosome haplogroups. These haplogroups are specific sub-groups of haplogroups A and B, the two earliest branches on the human Y-chromosome tree.

=== Mitochondrial DNA ===
In 200,000 BP, Africans (e.g., Khoisan of Southern Africa) bearing haplogroup L0 diverged from other Africans bearing haplogroup L1′6, which tend to be northward of Southern Africa. Between 130,000 BP and 75,000 BP, behavioral modernity emerged among Southern Africans and long-term interactions between the regions of Southern Africa and Eastern Africa became established.

Mitochondrial DNA studies also provide evidence that the San carry high frequencies of the earliest haplogroup branches in the human mitochondrial DNA tree. This DNA is inherited only from one's mother. The most divergent (oldest) mitochondrial haplogroup, L0d, has been identified at its highest frequencies in the southern African San groups.

=== Autosomal DNA ===
In a study published in March 2011, Brenna Henn and colleagues found that the ǂKhomani San, as well as the Sandawe and Hadza peoples of Tanzania, were the most genetically diverse of any living humans studied. This high degree of genetic diversity hints at the origin of anatomically modern humans.

=== Medical DNA ===
Among the ancient DNA from three hunter-gatherers sharing genetic similarity with San people and four Iron Age agriculturalists, their SNPs indicated that they bore variants for resistance against sleeping sickness and Plasmodium vivax. In particular, two out of the four Iron Age agriculturalists bore variants for resistance against sleeping sickness and three out of the four Iron Age agriculturalists bore Duffy negative variants for resistance against malaria. In contrast to the Iron Age agriculturalists, from among the San-related hunter-gatherers, a six year old boy may have died from schistosomiasis. In Botswana, a man, who dates to 1400 BP, may have also carried the Duffy negative variant for resistance against malaria.

The genomes of Africans commonly found to undergo adaptation are regulatory DNA, and many cases of adaptation found among Africans relate to diet, physiology, and evolutionary pressures from pathogens. Throughout Sub-Saharan Africa, genetic adaptation (e.g., rs334 mutation, Duffy blood group, increased rates of G6PD deficiency, sickle cell disease) to malaria has been found among Sub-Saharan Africans, which may have initially developed in 7300 BP. Sub-Saharan Africans have more than 90% of the Duffy-null genotype. In the Kalahari Desert region of Africa, various possible genetic adaptations (e.g., adiponectin, body mass index, metabolism) have been found among the ǂKhomani people. Sub-Saharan Africans have more than 90% of the Duffy-null genotype. In South Africa, genetic adaptation (e.g., rs28647531 on chromosome 4q22) and strong susceptibility to tuberculosis has been found among Coloureds.

== Timeline of archaeological cultures and sites ==
- Lomekwi (3,300,000 BP)
- Taung (3,030,000 BP)
- Sterkfontein (2,800,000 BP)
- Drimolen (2,000,000 BP)
- Kromdraai fossil site (2,000,000 BP)
- Cooper's Cave (1,900,000 BP)
- Canteen Kopje (1,890,000 BP)
- Swartkrans (1,800,000 BP)
- Motsetsi (1,640,000 BP)
- Wonderwerk Cave (1,000,000 BP)
- Amanzi Springs archaeological site (Middle Pleistocene)
- Rising Star Cave (414,000 BP)
- Kalambo Falls (300,000 BP – 200,000 BP)
- Duinefontein (290,000 BP)
- Gladysvale Cave (257,000 BP)
- Florisbad archaeological and paleontological site (200,000 BP)
- Mumbwa Caves (194,000 BP – 124,000 BP)
- Pinnacle Point (164,000 BP)
- Hoedjiespunt (130,000 BP)
- Ngalue (105,000 BP)
- Blombos Cave (84,000 BP)
- Stillbay (80,000 BP)
- Howieson's Poort Shelter (80,000 BP – 60,000 BP)
- Mousteroid (80,000 BP – 50,000 BP)
- Peers Cave (75,000 BP)
- Howiesons Poort (68,000 BP – 60,000 BP)
- Boomplaas Cave (66,000 BP)
- Klasies River Caves (66,000 BP)
- Diepkloof Rock Shelter (65,000 BP)
- Plovers Lake (62,900 BP)
- Sibudu Cave (61,000 BP)
- Fauresmith (industry) (60,300 BP – 32,600 BP)
- Border Cave (58,200 BP)
- Ngwenya Mine (43,000 BP)
- Apollo 11 Cave (30,000 BP)
- Elands Bay Cave (19,398 BP)
- Tsodilo (14,500 BP)
- Mwela Rock Paintings (10,820 BP)
- Kalemba Rockshelter (10,000 BP – 8,000 BP)
- Matsieng Footprints (10,000 BP – 3000 BP)
- Nelson Bay Cave (9000 BP)
- Jubilee Shelter (8500 BP)
- Twyfelfontein (5850 BP)
- Rose Cottage Cave (4000 BP)
- The White Lady (3000 BCE – 1500 BCE)
- Mussel Point (3500 BP)
- Byneskranskop (3200 BP – 1500 BP)
- Driekops Eiland (2500 BP)
- Bambata Cave (215 CE)
- Ziwa (1630 BP)
- Chibuene (7th century CE)
- Toutswemogala Hill (7th century CE – 19th century CE)
- Leopard's Kopje (750 CE – 800 CE)
- Bambandyanalo (1000 CE)
- Great Zimbabwe (1300 CE)
- Domboshaba (1300 CE – 1600 CE)
- Majojo (1300 CE – 1650 CE)
- Mbande Hill (600 BP)
- Kingdom of Mapungubwe (1370 CE – 1410 CE)
- Manyikeni (14th century CE)
- Khami (1450 CE – 1820 CE)
- Dzata ruins (pre-1600 CE)
- Blaauboschkraal stone ruins (16th century CE)
- Ingombe Ilede (16th century CE)
- Danangombe (1650 CE – 1815 CE)
- Burchell's Shelter (post-1660 CE)
- Mamuno Monument (200 BP)
- Kaditshwene (1790 CE)
- Bumbusi National Monument (18th century CE)
- Tlokwe Ruins (19th century CE)
- Old Palapye (19th century CE)
- Dundo (1912 CE)

=== List of archaeological cultures and sites ===
- Cango Caves
- Eye of Kuruman
- Gwisho Hot-Springs
- Heritage Western Cape
- Kathu Archaeological Complex
- ǁKhauxaǃnas
- Kogelbeen Cave
- Kolobeng Mission
- Kweneng' Ruins
- Magosian
- Makapansgat
- Malapa Fossil Site, Cradle of Humankind
- Melkhoutboom Cave
- Melville Koppies
- Naletale
- Nooitgedacht Glacial Pavements
- Northern Cape Heritage Resources Authority
- Nyambwezi Falls
- Paternoster Midden
- Sangoan
- Schoemansdal, Limpopo
- Sedan Beehive stone huts
- Wildebeest Kuil Rock Art Centre
- Witsie's Cave (Lekhalong la Witsie)

== See also ==
- List of kingdoms in Africa throughout history#Southern Africa
