= Sites and monuments in Botswana =

Botswana's most popular landmarks range from a group of large baobab trees to giant-size footprints fossilized in the rock. Other natural attractions include expanses of salt flats, the Kalahari Desert and some very beautiful mountains. Some are listed in the world Heritage Convention by UNESCO.

| Monument identifier | Description | Date in gazette as monument | Original function | Built | Location | Address | Comment | Coordinates | Image |
|---|---|---|---|---|---|---|---|---|---|
| BOT-001 | Mamuno Monument a.k.a. Kangumene Rock Engravings | 2006 | Three rock engraving sites, with art works and engravings | | 750 metres (2,460 ft) from the international border post at Mamuno | Ghanzi District | There are footprints, geometrical designs and weapons. The art found at the Mamuno sites is distinct from the Shamanistic form found in eastern Botswana. | 22°16′53″S 20°00′28″E | Upload Photo |
| BOT-002 | Gcwihaba Caves a.k.a. Rotsky's Caves | | The caves are imbued with myth, legend and spiritual significance for local communities, which also use them for income generating activities. | | North West Botswana in the Ngamiland District. | | | 20°01′23″S 21°21′19″E | Upload Photo |
| BOT-003 | Domboshaba | | It was occupied towards the end of the Great Zimbabwe period (1250-1450AD). It was a regional centre in the Khami phase (1450-1690AD) | | Northeast District | | | 20°40′00″S 27°25′00″E | |
| BOT-004 | Old Palapye | | Has the remains of the Ngwato capital, which was established there in 1889, during the reign of the famous Kgosi Khama III | | Tswapong area in Eastern Botswana. | | It was one of the largest towns in Southern Africa in 1889, with about 30000 inhabitants | 22°34′00″S 27°18′00″E | Upload Photo |
| BOT-005 | Kolobeng | | One of the early churches and formal schools in Botswana | | Kweneng District | | First western medical doctor practiced here | 24°39′16″S 25°39′55″E | Upload Photo |
| BOT-006 | Majojo | | Residence of a chief or "Kgosi", between 1300-1650AD | | Central District. | | | | Upload Photo |
| BOT-007 | Matsieng a.k.a. Creation Sites | | | | Kgatleng District, near Rasesa village | | | | Upload Photo |
| BOT-008 | Tsodilo Hills | | | | NorthWest | | There are certain myths revolving around the history of these hills. | | Upload Photo |

== Sources ==
- Thebe, Phenyo Churchill (2011). "Contract Archaeology in Botswana: The Case of the Botswana Development Corporation Lodge Project at Mamuno". Botswana Notes and Records. 43: 151–164. JSTOR 23237963.
