= Kotolaname =

- Village
- Location in Botswana
- Coordinates: 24°28′20″S 25°16′33″E
- Country: Botswana
- District: Kweneng District

Population (2001)
  - Total: 278

Kotolaname is a village in Kweneng District of Botswana. It is located 30 km west of Molepolole, and the population was 278 in 2001 census.
