= Monwane =

- Location in Botswana
- Coordinates: 24°18′59″S 25°12′51″E
- Country: Botswana
- District: Kweneng District

Population (2001)
  - Total: 375

Monwane is a village in Kweneng District of Botswana. It is located 40 km West-northwest of Molepolole, and it has a primary school. The population was 375 in 2001 census.
