= Mahetlwe =

- Village
- Location in Botswana
- Coordinates: 24°14′23″S 25°40′35″E
- Country: Botswana
- District: Kweneng District

Population (2001)
  - Total: 591

Mahetlwe is a village in Kweneng District of Botswana. It is located around 25 km north-east of Molepolole, and the population was 591 in 2001 census.
