= Mmankgodi =

- Village
- Location in Botswana
- Coordinates: 24°43′26″S 25°38′20″E
- Country: Botswana
- District: Kweneng District

Population (2011)
  - Total: 6,802

Mmankgodi is a village in Kweneng District of Botswana. It is located 35 km from Gaborone and around 30 km from the border with South Africa. The population of Mmankgodi was 6,802 in 2011 census.

The people of Mmankgodi are predominantly Bahurutshe, a Tswana group also found in the village of Manyana. According to Kgosi Thobega, the Bahurutshe originated in South Africa and fled Boer oppression, arriving in Botswana in 1852 under the leadership of Kgosi Masega. They reached Dimawe, where they were received by Kgosi Sechele, and participated in the Battle of Dimawe later that year. After the battle, the Bahurutshe moved to Dithejwane before later returning to Mmankgodi, where they settled on Mmankgodi Hill.
