= Battle of Dimawe =

1852 battle between Batswana and Boers

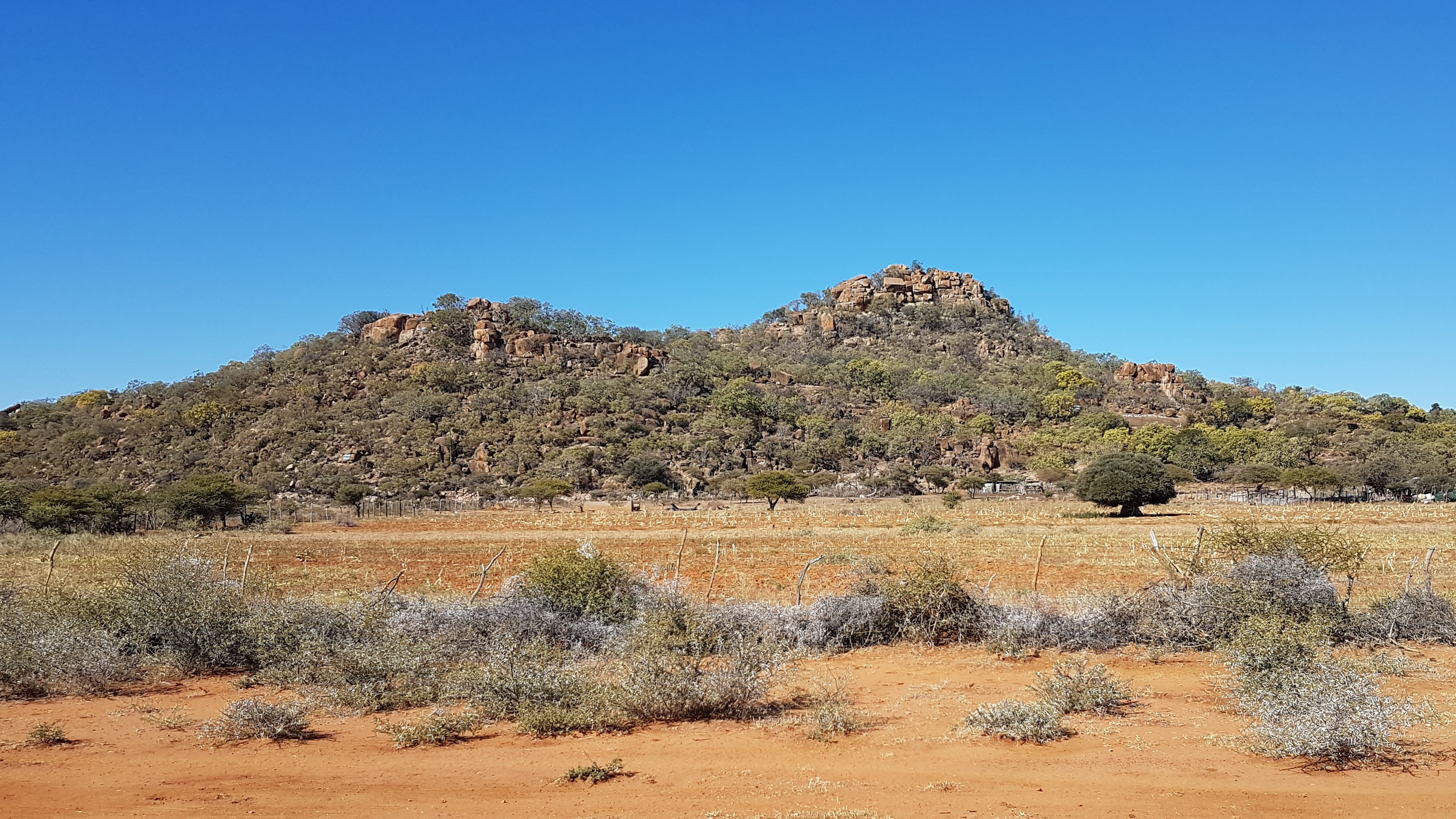
- Dimawe Hill in the Kweneng District, between Mmankgodi and Manyana, where the battle took place
Date	August 1852 over the course of 3–7 days
Location	Dimawe Hill, outside Mmankgodi, Kweneng District, 30 kilometres (19 mi) from Gaborone, Botswana 24°45′43″S 25°37′49″E
Result	Batswana victory

Belligerents
Various Batswana (Bakwena, Batlokwa, Balete, and Bahurutshe) tribal warriors	Voortrekkers

Commanders and leaders
Kgosi Setshele I	Andries Pretorius

Strength
3,000+	1,000+ men

Casualties and losses
60 dead	38 dead
- Location within Botswana

The Battle of Dimawe was fought between several Batswana tribes and the Boers in August 1852. Under the command of Kgosi Setshele I of the Bakwena tribe, the Batswana were victorious at Dimawe Hill.

== Background ==
Friend of my heart's love, and of all the confidence of my heart, I am Sechele. I am undone by the Boers, who attacked me, though I had no guilt with them. They demanded that I should be in their kingdom, and I refused. They demanded that I should prevent the English and Griquas from passing. I replied, These are my friends, and I can prevent no one.

— Excerpt of a letter from Kgosi Sechele I to Robert Moffat

According to Paul Kruger, a chief called Mosielele the chief of Bakgatla-ba-ga Mmanana had committed several murders in the South African Republic and then fled to Sechele I, who refused to hand him over to the Boers, saying "Who wants Mosielele can come and fetch him out of my stomach". He meant to convey that Mosielele was as safely hidden with him as the food which he had eaten.

When the Boers arrived Sechele I sent a messenger to Commandant Scholtz to say that he would do nothing to him on the morrow, as that was a Sunday, but that he would duly settle the account on the Monday. At the same time he demanded coffee and sugar, probably in return for his amiability in "letting the Boers off" for Sunday. Commandant Scholtz send back word that he had coffee and sugar, but none to give away. He promised to give him pepper on Monday.

== Battle ==
=== Initial battle ===
The Battle began on Monday morning. During the battle Paul Kruger was injured by friendly fire ricochet, and was also stuck in the chest, tearing apart his jacket.

The Bakwena had knowledge of the surrounding hilltops and used them as watchtowers and hiding places. When the Boers were spotted, Kgosi Setshele ordered the women and children to hide; Setshele's own pregnant wife was hidden in Mmasechele Cave several kilometers away. As the Boer troops climbed the hills, Setshele's warriors rolled large stones down the hillside to crush the Boers.

Reportedly using captured Africans as human shields, forcing the Batswana to hold their fire, the Boers captured Dimawe, and they succeeded in forcing Setshele to flee. They also captured about 400 civilians, mainly women and children, which they then used as "inkoboekelinge" to work in farms, which was, according to David Livingstone, slavery.

Afterwards the Boers raided the house of David Livingstone at the Kolobeng Mission. And found a complete workshop for repairing guns, and materials of war, in breach of the Sand River Convention of 1852.

=== Batswana counter-attack ===
Despite the initial Batswana defeat, Sechele soon returned and conducted several retaliatory raids using European guns against the Boers, which inflicted several casualties on its enemies, forced the Boers to retreat, and enabled the Batswana to recover their lost territory. After pushing the Boers back, the Batswana raided and plundered several Boer farms until a peace treaty was signed.

== Aftermath ==
After the battle, the Tswana tribes split; the Bakwena traveled to Ditlhakane and Dithubaruba while the Bahurutshe finally settled in the Kolobeng River valley around Dimawe Hill.

An agreement was signed between the Boers and the Batswana in January 1853. Setshele attempted to travel to Great Britain to ask for further protection from the Boers, but he only made it to Cape Town before being turned back. The British did not want to make an agreement with the Batswana as that would hurt relations with the Boers. However, this first failed attempt may have inspired a second successful trip to Britain in 1895 during which Kgosi Khama III, Kgosi Sebele I, and Kgosi Bathoen I asked for Botswana's incorporation into the Bechuanaland Protectorate, a separate entity from Cecil Rhodes's British South Africa Company or the South African Republic. While Kgosi Setshele was en route to Britain, a group of Setshele's army encountered a small group of Boers. The Boers were so frightened that they arranged to have Setshele's children, who were captured and enslaved by a Boer commandant, returned to him.

== See also ==
- History of Gaborone
