= Kalemba Rockshelter =

Archaeological site in Zambia

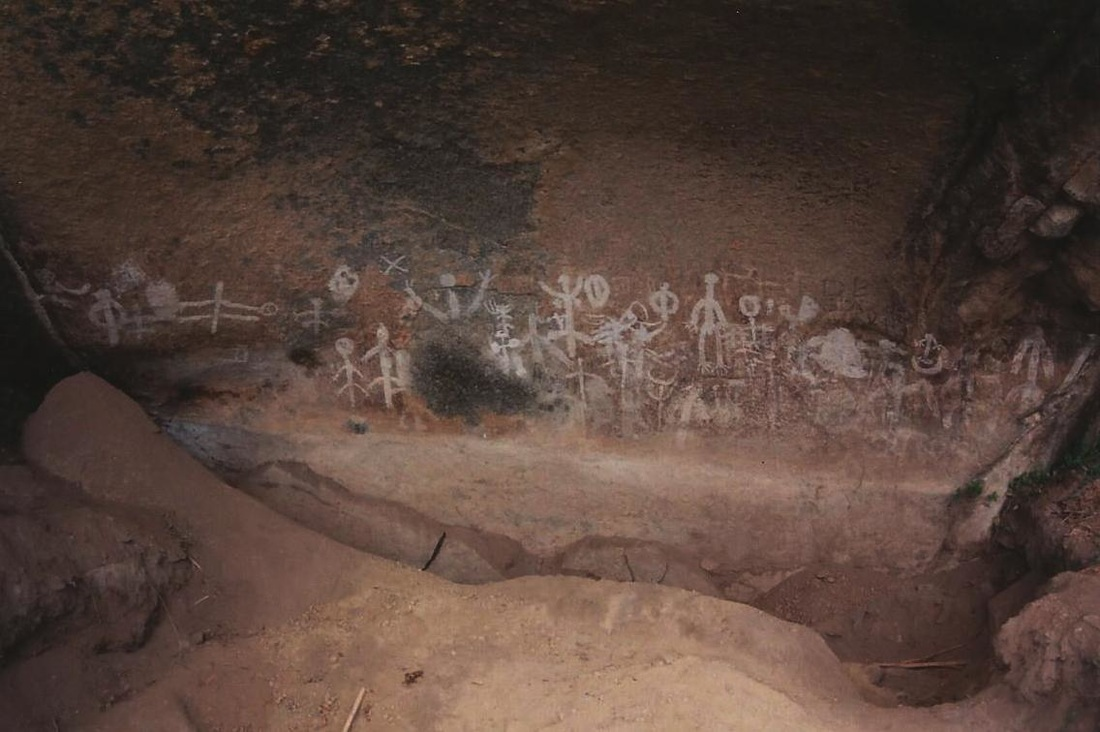
- Wall paintings in Kalemba Rockshelter

- location in Zambia
- 14°7′0″S 32°3′0″E
- Associated with: Ngoni people
- Region: Zambia

Site notes
- Excavation dates: 1971
- Archaeologists: R. A. Hamilton

The Kalemba Rockshelter is an archaeology site located in eastern Zambia, at coordinates 14°7 S and 32°3 E. Local tradition recalls the use of the rock shelter as a refuge during the time of Ngoni raiding in the 19th century. The site is known for various rock paintings as well as advanced microlithic use.

== History of research ==
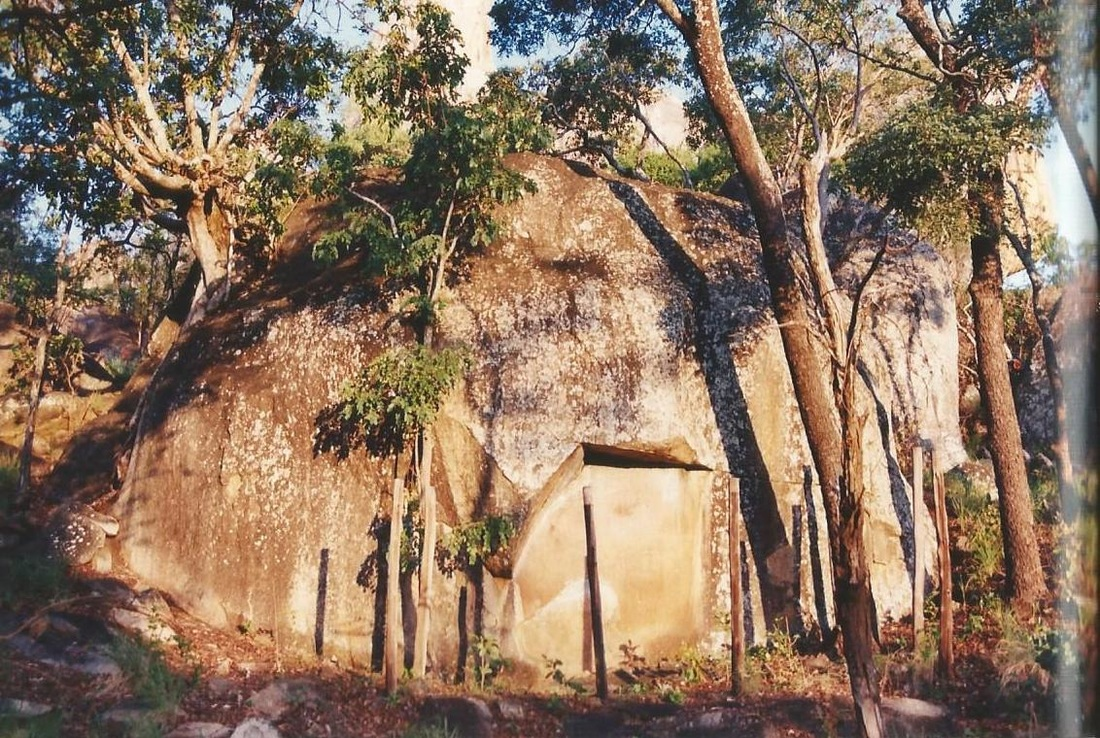
Exterior of the site

The Kalemba rockshelter is an archaeological site located in eastern Zambia, discovered in 1955 by R. A. Hamilton and then reported to the former Rhodes-Livingstone Museum. But it wasn't until 1971 that the site was excavated by D.W. Phillipson. Over 30 meters in height, the rock shelter is formed by an outcrop of granite gneiss. Facing the Chipwete valley, on the north-west side the rockshelter has a height of 4.5 meters, maximum, and extends 7 m (23 ft) through an open area for protection. The flat surface is located near the north-east side of the rockshelter; closed off on all sides, it has a steep rocky headland on the main hillside. The north and south-west of the rockshelter provide an extension of floor living space as well as a decent vantage point that overlooks the upper Chipwete valley. A second, smaller, less protected shelter has a floor of 6 by 12 m (20 by 39 ft) and adjoins, at the southwest end of the main shelter. Entrance from the north end of the main shelter or from the hills at the southern corner allows for easy access to both rock shelters. Paintings are located at both shelters; with a distance of 12 meters located at the rear wall of the main shelter and under the south western overhang lies a smaller panel.

== Excavation ==
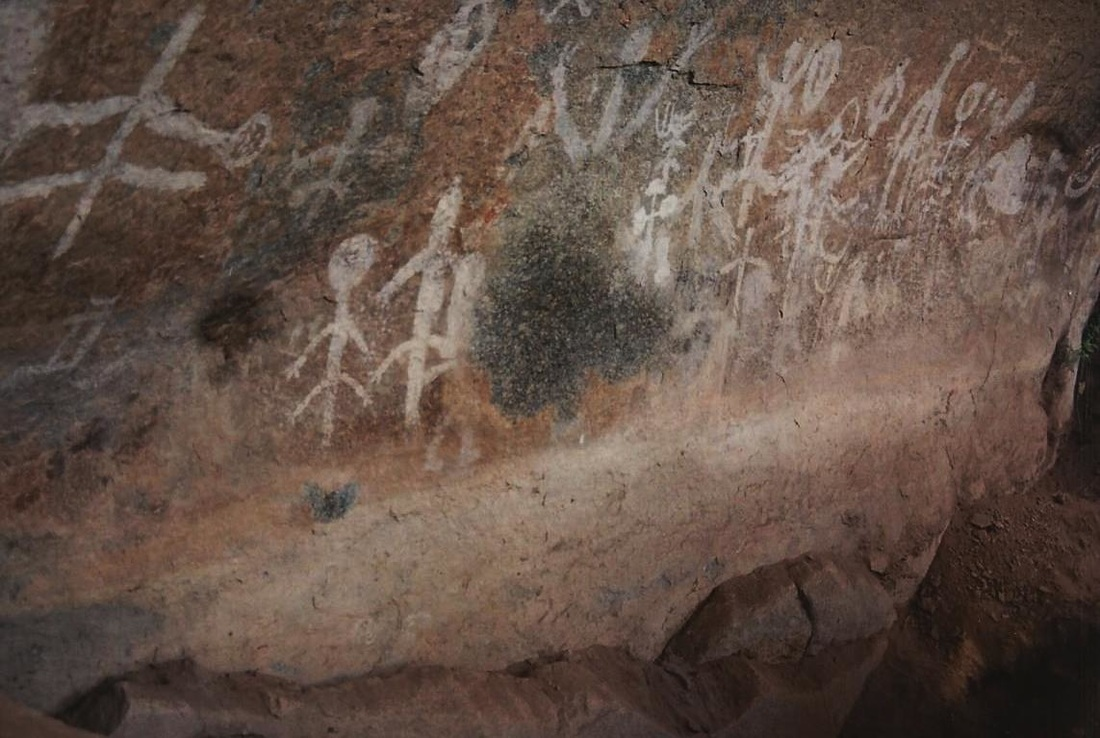
Wall paintings

Originally, the excavation at Kalemba was restricted to a grid of 10 squares, however, an extension was needed in order to avoid collapse around the side walls. The excavation was divided into two parts due to a fallen boulder that lies equidistant to the wall of the main shelter. A total of thirteen separate soil horizons were identified. In order for Philipson and members part of the excavation to gain access to the lower levels, they had to add an additional extension to the excavation to the north-west. Ultimately, the excavation had covered a total area of 40.2 m^{2} (433 sq ft). Charcoal was collected for radiocarbon dating as well as soil samples for pedagogical analysis. However, after some time the excavation had to be deserted at a depth of 4.3 m (14.1 ft) due to unsafe condition with the side walls. To further the excavation, it was necessary to remove boulders weighing about 25 tonnes with the use of a block and tackle. It is assumed that the richest deposits are located underneath those boulders. Unfortunately, the resources necessary to deal safely and successfully with the situation of the boulders were not available to D.W. Philipson in 1971, therefore, the excavation had to come to a halt.

== Stratigraphy and dating ==
Radiocarbon dates suggest that human occupation covered about 37,000 years at Kalemba. If the hypothesis that dates GX-2767 and GX-2768 are better represented by the dating to around 13,000 years BCE, then according to Phillipson, the remaining dates are consistent and form a series that suggests several periods of occupation that follow: period 1, before 35,000 years BCE; period 2, c. 25,000 to 21,000 years BCE; Period 3, c. 15,000 to 11,000 years BCE, and period 4 < 6,000 years BCE.

== Finds ==
- Flakes
- Stone
- Hammer stones, anvils, rubbing and grinding stone
- Bone artifacts
- Shell artifacts
- Pottery
- Metal objects
- Burials
- Remains of pole and bamboo-framed shelters

=== Flakes ===
The flakes are based on 1243 whole flakes with random samples taken from roughly 100 specimens. To name a few of the flakes discovered, there are curved back geometric which represent roughly 30 percent of the retouched implements found. Pointed lunates were also discovered which represent an even larger portion of curved backed geometric category, 59 percent to be exact, none of the pointed lunates bear an eared projection at the tip, however, in the more recent periods, the tip on one is more emphasized. Another type of flake discovered was the deep lunate with a mean length of 15.7 mm (0.6 in) and only thirty three of these specimens being collected. Only seventeen of asymmetrical lunate was collected having a mean length of 16.3 mm (0.6 in). A couple of microliths were discovered, twenty seven trapezoidal microlith with a mean of 15.9 mm (0.6 in) and fourteen triangular microliths with a mean length of 13.8 mm (0.5 in).

=== Ground stone artefacts ===
Eleven axes, two pestles, four stones and one linguate object were collected according to Phillipson. The linguate object as well as the stone were the only ones of that type to be found in Eastern Zambia in archaeological context.

=== Hammerstones. anvils, rubbing and grinding stones ===
About thirty seven knapping hammers were collected, thirty two of them were unbroken and weigh anywhere from 15 to 25 g (0.53 to 0.88 oz) a piece. Out of all the knapping stones only one was quartz and a preferred type of hammer—pieces of flattened ovoid shape were apparent in the discovery. Twelve pounding stones were collected, with maximum dimensions of 68 to 118 mm (2.7 to 4.6 in) and a mean of 87 mm (3.4 in). Four anvils were collected, three being quartz and one on chert cobble. Seven rubbing stones were collected and only one grinding stone. However, the grinding stone was 67 mm (2.6 in) thick and was grounded to a depth of twelve mm. The last use for the grinding stone was for a red pigment.

=== Bone artifacts ===
Three headed pins were collected and discovered to be produced from the long bones of a large bird. Eight straight bodkins and two curved bodkins were found which vary from oval to circular. One of the curved bodkins seem to be a small sharpened rib while the other being a completely worked indeterminate bone. Two complete conical points were collected 47 mm (1.9 in) and 54 mm (2.1 in) in length; indicate origins of splinter bone. A needle was also collected, however, it is assumed that it isn't entirely natural. Finally, one carved bone tool was discovered originating from a bird's long bone being 6 mm (0.2 in) in diameter.

=== Shell artifacts ===
Fourteen disc beads, one pendant and one disc were collected at Kalemba. Four of the beads were made from achatina shell, one was made from water snail shell, and the remaining nine were made from an indeterminable land snail. The shell disc, was a broken half of a water snail shell. And the shell pendant was also made from water snail shell, but it is assumed it was lost or discarded before it was actually completed.

=== Pottery ===
Only three complete vessels were collected, but remains of 392 potsherds were also discovered. 100 of the sherds were decorated at the rim, but the remaining 292 were undecorated body sherds.

=== Metal objects ===
Four pieces of worked iron metal were found. A ring and wire were present. The ring being 25 mm (1.0 in) in diameter with a rectangular band 5 by 48 mm (0.2 by 1.9 in). The wire was 34 mm (1.3 in) in length and a diameter of 3 mm (0.1 in) maximum.

=== Features ===
Features discovered during the excavation include: Four human burials (graves) and numerous remains of pole and bamboo-framed shelters.

=== Wall paintings ===
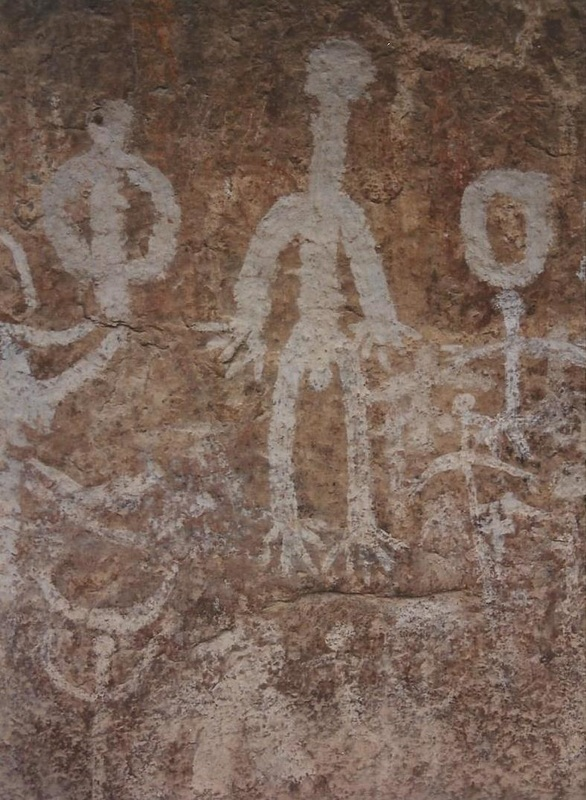

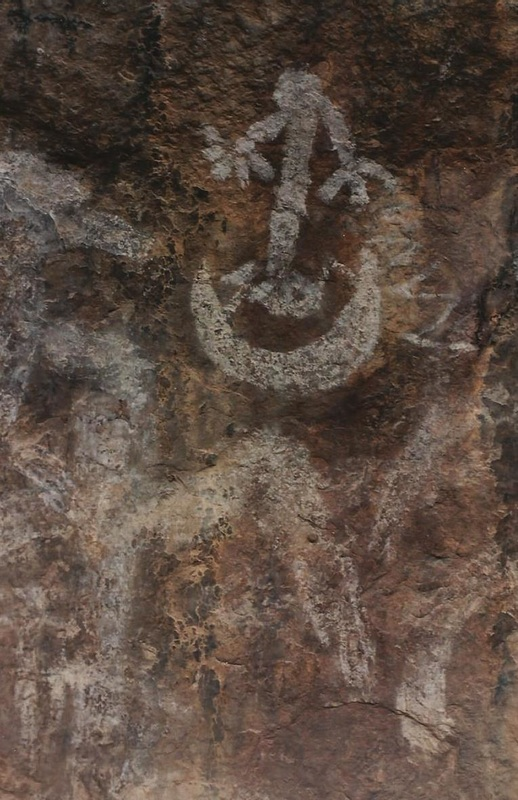

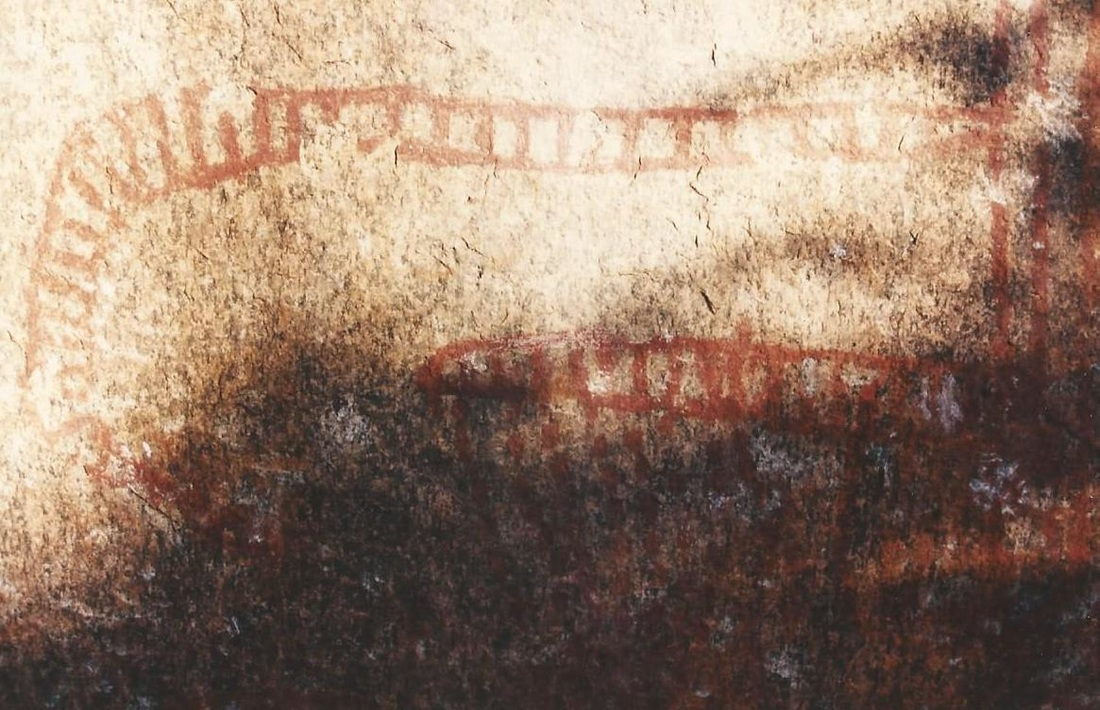

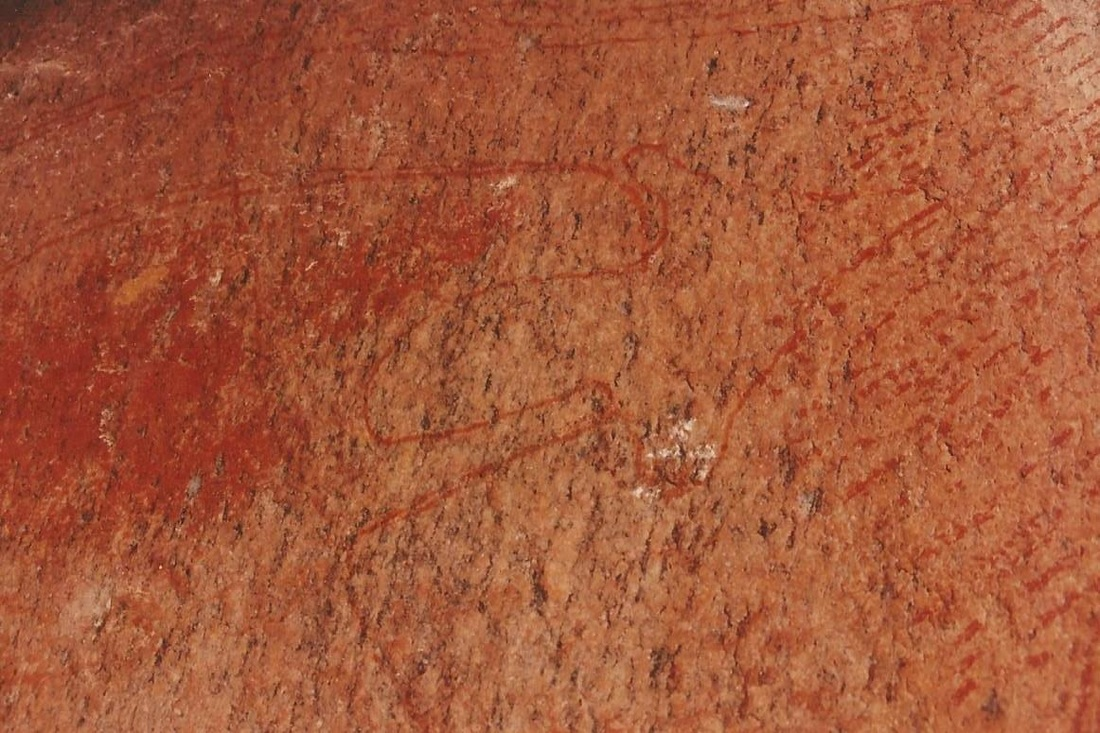

== See also ==
- Mumbwa Caves
- History of Zambia
