= Muzinda =

- Location in Burundi
- Coordinates: 3°15′50″S 29°25′15″E
- Country: Burundi
- Province: Bubanza Province
- Commune: Commune of Rugazi
- Time zone: UTC+2 (Central Africa Time)

Muzinda is a village in the Commune of Rugazi in Bubanza Province in western Burundi.
