= Mwela Rock Paintings =

Petroglyphic site in Zambia

The Mwela Rock Paintings are a national monument of Zambia, about 4.8 kilometers (3.0 mi) east of Kasama.

The rock paintings (about 700 in all) are in caves and overhangs spread over a very wide area of bush, north of the Kasama Isoka road at 10°10' S 31°13' E, where a signpost denotes the ‘Mwela Rocks National Monument’ with an entry kiosk and guides to escort visitors.

Archaeologists rate the Kasama rock art as one of the largest and most significant collections of ancient art in Southern Africa, though their quality is outdone in Zimbabwe and Namibia. The works are attributed to Stone Age hunter-gatherers (sometimes known as Batwa or Twa) and are up to 2000 years old. Many are abstract designs, but some of the finest pictographs show human figures and animals, often capturing a remarkable sense of fluidity and movement, despite being stylised with huge bodies and minute limbs. It is considered the most compact site of rock paintings in Africa.

The site was declared a National Monument in 1964, although it got recognition as early as 1945. As of 2017 it was reported to attract an average of 350 local and international tourists per month.

This site was re-added to the UNESCO World Heritage Tentative List on March 10, 2009, in the Mixed category.
