= Majojo =

Hill in Botswana

Majojo is a small hill found in the central district of Botswana. It is categorized under the monuments and sites in Botswana. According to history, these hill was the residence of the chief. They were called Muzinda, which means the residence of the chief or kgosi around 1300-1650 AD. Majojo stone walls is an extension of the tradition of great Zimbabwe. Majojo ruins is respected by the locals living there and it believed to be the home of their ancestors.
