= Sechele I =

Kgosi of the Bakwena of Bechuanaland (r. 1831–1892)

- Sechele
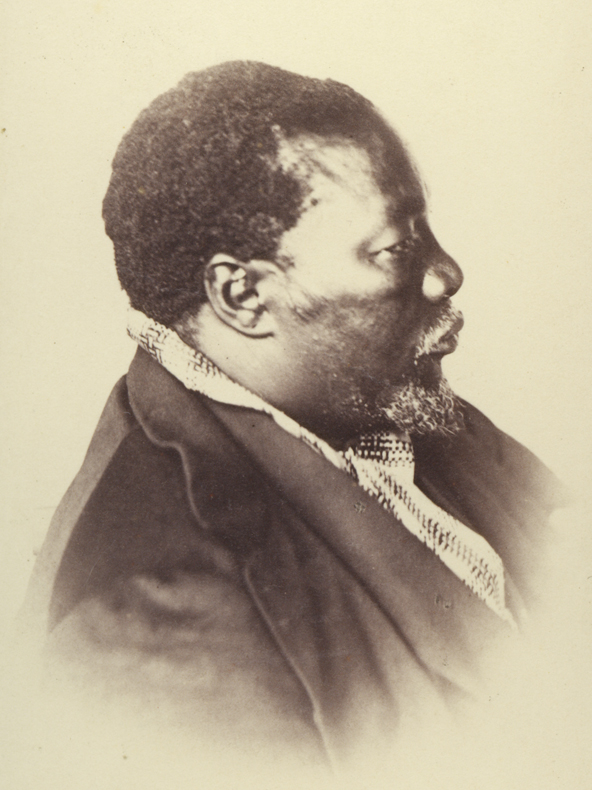
- Portrait taken by German anthropologist Gustav Fritsch at Ntsweng (nowadays, Old Molepolole) in 1865.
- Born: Circa 1812; Botswana
- Died: September 1892 (aged 81–82)
- Resting place: Tribal Cemetery at Molepolole
- Title: Kgosi of the Bakwena
- Term: 1831 – 1892
- Predecessor: Motswasele II
- Successor: Sebele I
- Children: Three sons: Kgari, Sebele and Tumagole.

Sechele I a Motswasele "Rra Mokonopi" (1812–1892), also known as Setshele, was the ruler of the Kwêna people of Botswana. He was converted to Christianity by David Livingstone and in his role as ruler served as a missionary among his own and other African peoples. According to Livingstone biographer Stephen Tomkins, Sechele was Livingstone's only African convert to Christianity, even though Livingstone himself came to regard Sechele as a "backslider". Sechele led a coalition of Batswana (Bakwêna, Bakaa, Balete, Batlokwa) in the Battle of Dimawe in 1852.

== Early life ==
Sechele was born in 1812, the son of the chief of the Kwêna tribe of Tswana people of what is modern-day Botswana. When Sechele was ten years old, his father was killed and the leadership of the tribe was divided between his two uncles. Sechele and some of his supporters fled into the desert. He spent some years among the Ngwato people and married Mokgokong, a daughter of Chief Kgari. In about 1831 he succeeded in replacing one of his uncles as ruler of half the baKwêna.

== Conversion to Christianity ==
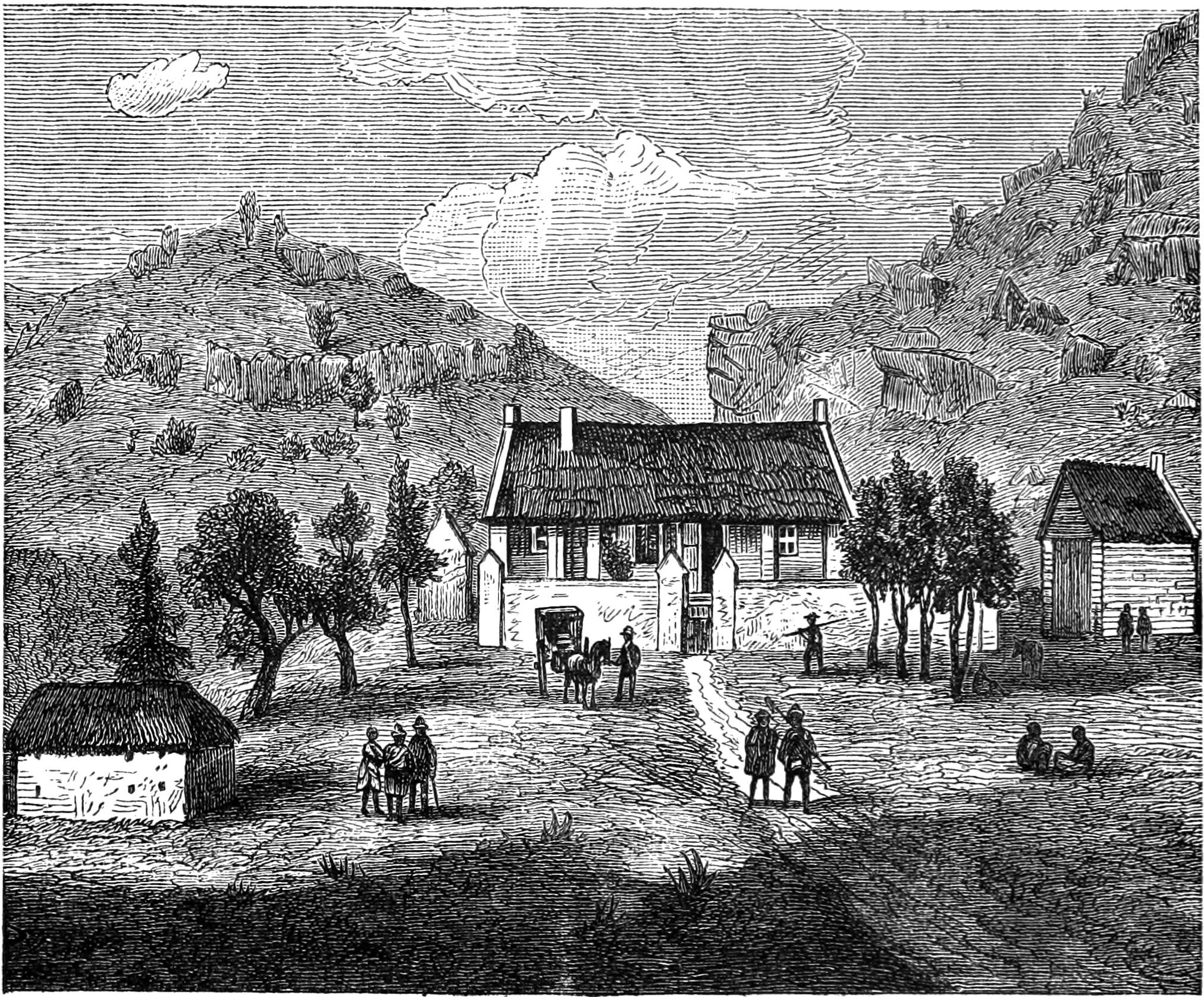
Mission house in Molopolole

In 1847 Sechele met David Livingstone at Tshwane. He and his people accompanied the missionary to the Kolobeng River where Livingstone set up the Kolobeng Mission. The establishment of missions was sometimes encouraged by local rulers because the missionaries gave them access to guns and gunpowder, which gave them an advantage over neighbouring tribes lacking such technology.

Sechele was eager to learn to read and write and was an adept student, learning the letters of the alphabet in two days. He became so keen on learning that he rose early and breakfasted before dawn. Once he had mastered reading, he taught his wives to read. The only book available in the language of the Tswana was the Bible. He later sent five of his children to be educated by another missionary, Robert Moffat (Livingstone's father-in-law), at Kuruman.

Sechele experienced several conflicts between local custom and Christianity. He had to give up his role as the local rainmaker. He fell into conflict with the Livingstone over his marriage to five women. At first Livingstone was inclined to be relaxed about it but feeling under pressure from other missionaries, he demanded divorce of four of the five. Sechele did so. As there were no further impediments, he was baptised in 1848.

After the divorces and Sechele's baptism, one of his ex-wives became pregnant by him. He also killed a European, apparently for judicial reasons. As a result, Livingstone denounced him as a Christian. This was despite Sechele's repentance and protestations of faith. Sechele told Livingstone, "I shall never give up Jesus. You and I will stand before him together".

During the time of their association, Livingstone urged Sechele to make peace with the uncle who ruled the other half of the Kwêna. Sechele sent his uncle a gift of gunpowder. The uncle was suspicious of the gift and set fire to it. His death in the resulting explosion enabled Sechele to reunite the tribe.

Sechele seems to have been a deep, independent thinker. He was powerfully committed to Jesus Christ (rather than European Christianity), such that he made this commitment at a time when it was politically and personally inconvenient to do so and, after Livingstone left him, he continued as missionary to his own and other people. Whereas most African converts simply assumed the ideas of European Christianity, Sechele went back to the original source, the Bible, and tried to work out a more African kind of Christianity. There is still controversy over the effects of this, and traditional missionaries of the time described him as, "half Christian, half heathen".

== Battle of Dimawe ==
Missionaries such as Livingstone were unpopular with the Boers, in Livingstone's case because he was believed to have supplied rifles and ammunition to the Kwêna. Because Sechele and the Kwêna lived on the route to Central Africa, between the Transvaal and Shoshong, Sechele was perceived by the Boers as a danger to their western border.

In 1852 a group of Bahurutshe people who were slaves of the Boers escaped and fled to the Kwêna for protection. The Boers destroyed the Kolobeng mission and attacked the Kwêna at Dimawe, where they encountered the combined Batswana tribes of Bakwêna, Bahurutshe, Balete and Batlokwa. Before the attack there was an attempt by the Batswana to protect the women and children by sending them into hiding, but according to Livingstone, many were taken prisoner by the Boers. Under the leadership of Sechele, Khama of Bangwato, and Bathoen I of Bangwaketse, the Boers were defeated by a combination of strategy and fire power.

Sechele and the London Missionary Society both complained about the Boers' actions to the Colonial Secretary in London. But because the British were at that time negotiating with the Boers over the Sand River Convention, the British High Commissioner was instructed not to go beyond "friendly remonstrances" with the Boers over the matter. The British did not want to risk their relationship with the Boers by appearing to side with Sechele. Moreover, British interests lay in consolidating their own position in the area, rather than protecting the African inhabitants from the Boers. Sechele set out for England with the intention of seeking the protection of Queen Victoria, but his resources ran out by the time he reached Cape Town.

== Mission ==
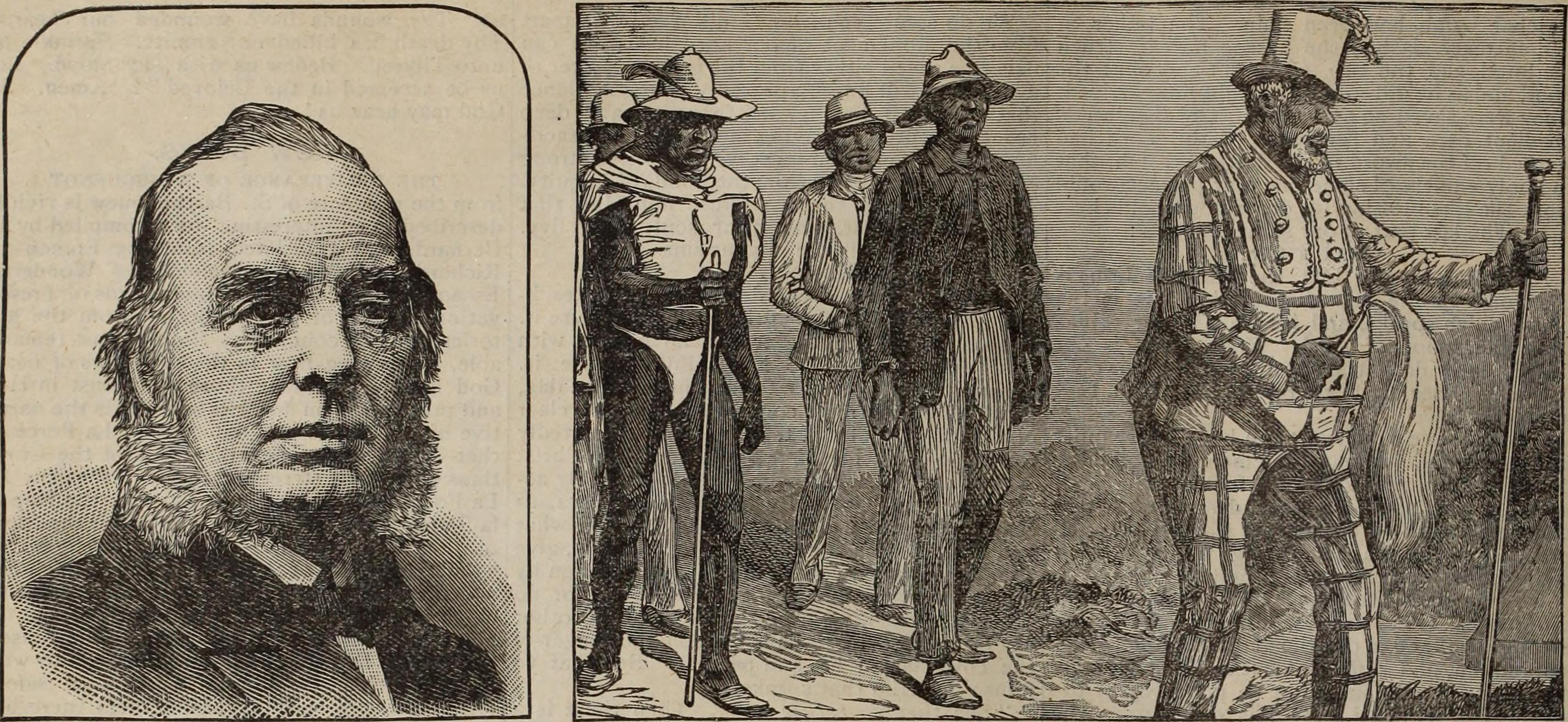
Christian herald and signs of our times (1886) The Late Rev. W. E. Boardman, Sechele, Chief of the Bechuanas, in State Attire. that, without employing the highest arguments at his disposal, the believer is able to defend his position against the assaults of the foe.

Sechele had a profound knowledge of the Bible and a commitment to spreading Christianity. He began with his own people, teaching them to read and introducing them to the Bible. He also travelled many hundreds of miles to evangelise other African peoples. When Moffat led a group of missionaries into Matabeleland in 1859, he discovered that Sechele had preceded him and that the local Ndebele people held Christian prayers. Moffat's mission had little success as an outbreak of lung disease among the missionaries' oxen resulted in fear of the white missionaries. Officially, there were no converts among the Ndebele until the 1880s.

After the departure of Livingstone, Sechele returned to some of his local customs, including rainmaking and polygamy. Missionaries complained that he used his great knowledge of the scriptures to defend his own actions. Neil Parsons, of the University of Botswana, stated that Sechele "did more to propagate Christianity in nineteenth-century southern Africa than virtually any single European missionary".

Under his leadership, his region became a refuge to other people fleeing persecution, and the numbers that he ruled exceeded 30,000 at the time of his death in 1892.
