= Sebele I =

King (kgosi) of the Tswana Kwena tribe (r. 1892–1911)

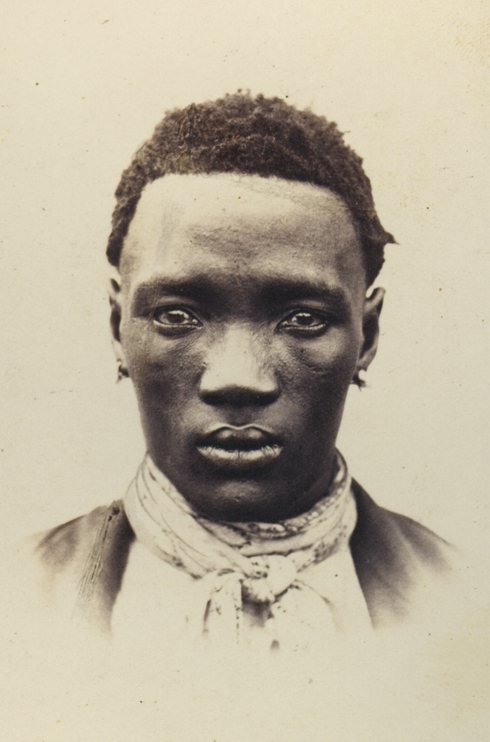
- Portrait of Sebele in his twenties taken by German anthropologist Gustav Fritsch at Ntsweng (nowadays, Old Molepolole) in 1865.
- Born: Circa 1841; Bechuanaland Protectorate (nowadays, Botswana)
- Died: January 1911 (aged 70–71); Bechuanaland Protectorate (nowadays, Botswana)
- Title: Kgosi of the Kwena
- Term: 1892 – 1911
- Predecessor: Sechele I
- Successor: Sechele II

Sebele I was a chief (kgosi) of the Kwena —a major Tswana tribe (morafe) in modern-day Botswana— who ruled from 1892 until his death in 1911. During his lifetime, he resisted the 1885 Bechuanaland Protectorate as well as the control of his domains by Cecil Rhodes' British South African Company, which was administering, by a royal charter signed in October 1889, his homeland in the Bechuanaland Protectorate and other regions of Central Africa.

== Biography ==
With support from Christian missionaries, Sebele traveled to Britain in 1895 along with Bathoen I and Khama III to argue against the latest attempts to incorporate the protectorate into the Cape Colony. They managed to secure support from Queen Victoria in exchange for an eastern strip of territory. Between 1908 and 1909 he also resisted the incorporation of Bechuanaland into the Union of South Africa.

== See also ==
- Three Dikgosi Monument
