= Scottish Livingstone Hospital =

Hospital in Botswana

- Botswana Ministry of Health
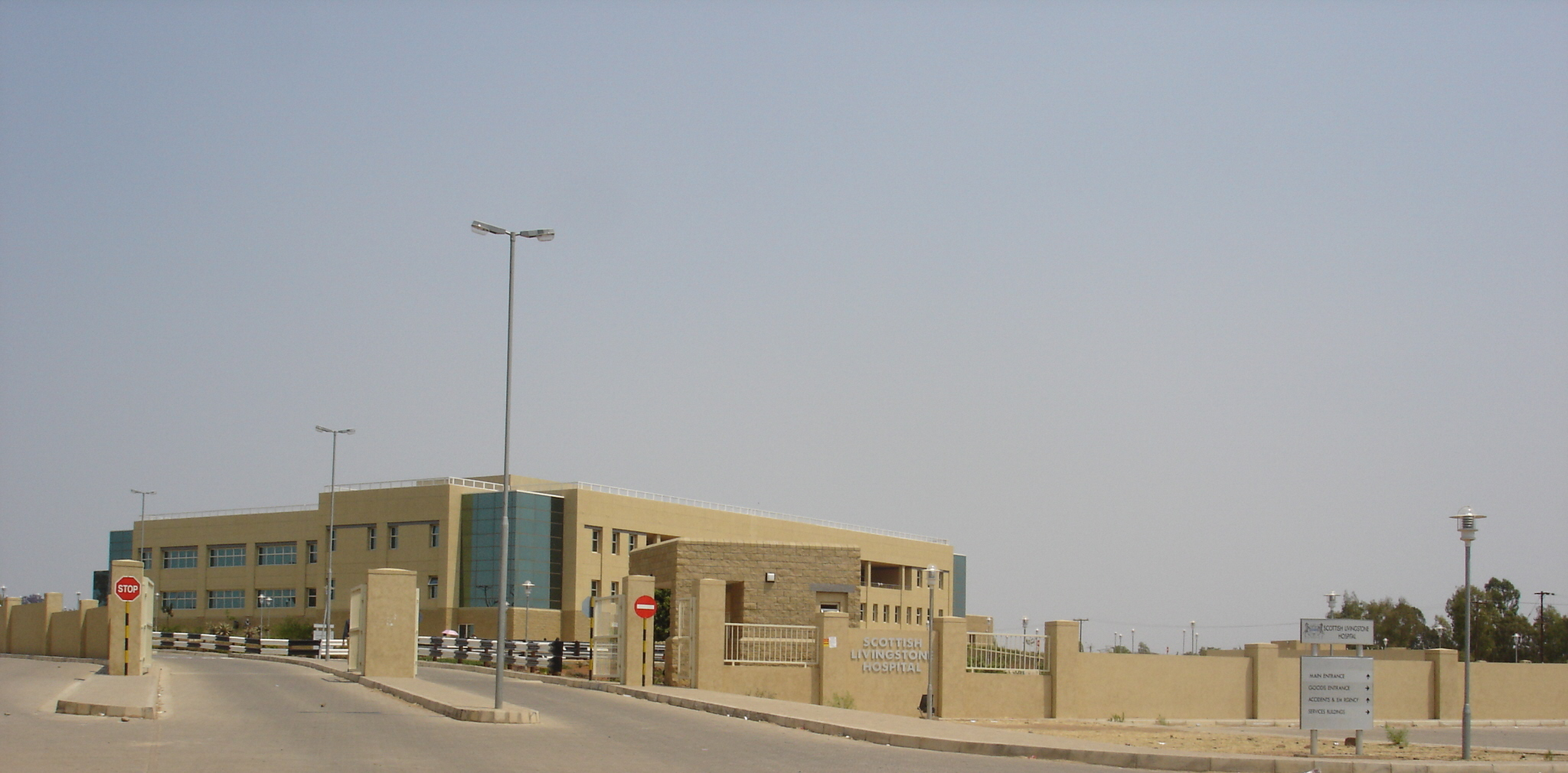

- Location in Botswana

Geography
- Location: Molepolole, Kweneng, Botswana
- Coordinates: 24.41244°S 25.48575°E

Organisation
- Care system: Public
- Type: District General
- Affiliated university: None
- Patron: United Free Church of Scotland

Services
- Beds: 550

Helipads
- Helipad: No

History
- Founded: 3 September 1934

Links
- Other links: List of hospitals in Botswana

Scottish Livingstone Hospital, also known as Molepolole Hospital, is a government-run district hospital located in Molepolole, Botswana, 60 kilometres (37 mi) from Gaborone.

== History ==
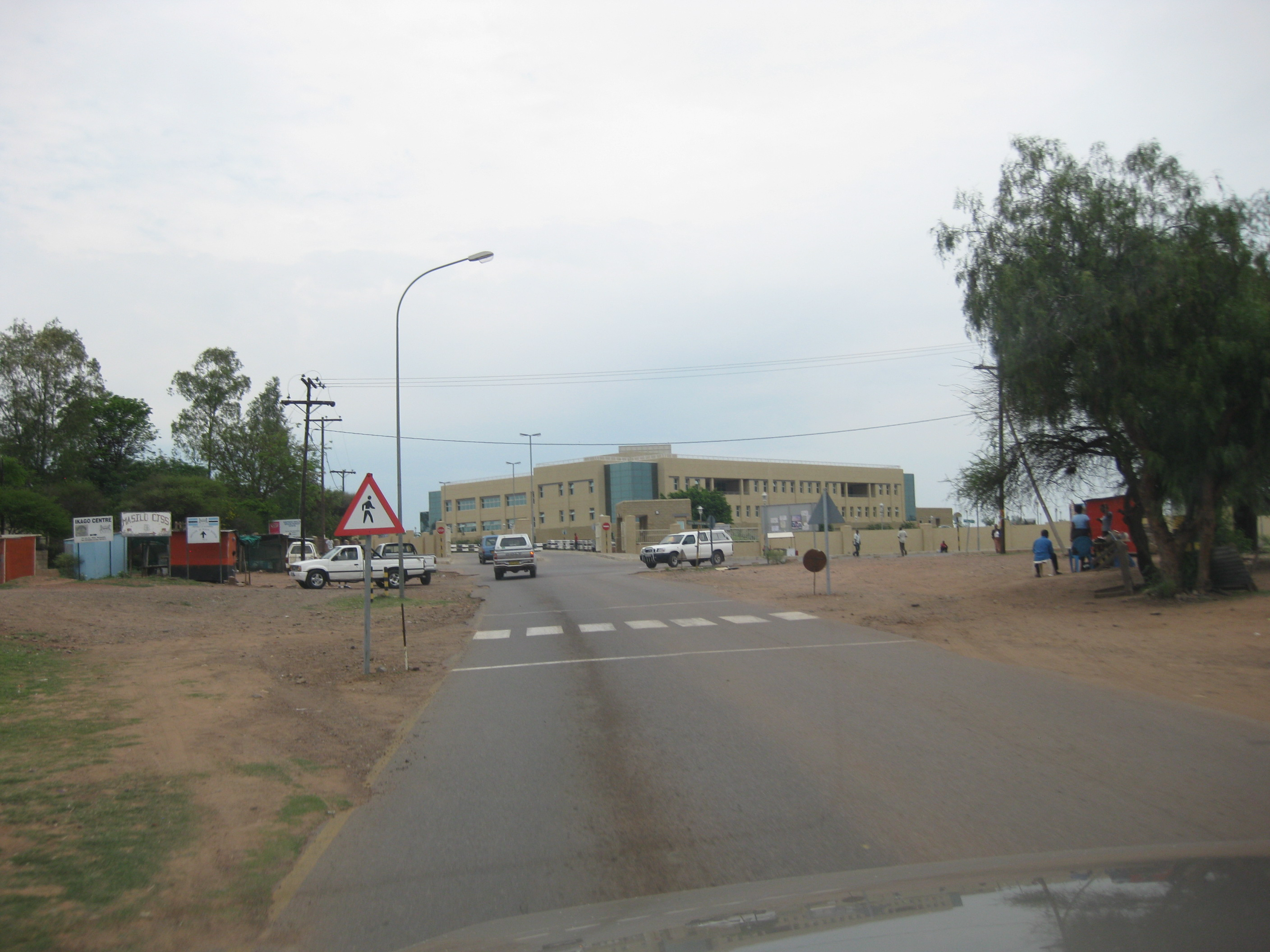
Scottish Livingstone Hospital

Scottish Livingstone Hospital was built in 1933 by the United Free Church of Scotland. It opened the following year on 3 September, and Dr Sheppard was the first doctor. At the time, the hospital only held 20 beds. The hospital was run with the assistance of the London Missionary Society. The Scottish Livingstone Hospital worked well that the British Bechuanaland Protectorate government asked the United Free Church to assist them with opening another hospital in Kanye as a way to undermine the Seventh-Day Adventists. The Kanye hospital only lasted eight years.

== Facilities ==
In order to combat the ongoing HIV/AIDS epidemic, the government opened a new hospital building in November 2007. The new building, built by Arup, hosts 350 beds and features high-tech heating and cooling systems.

The hospital houses an Infections Disease Care Clinic that offers antiretroviral therapy. Most of the doctors speak only English while the patients speak mostly Setswana. Thus, medical care is usually given through a translator. The number of doctors and amount of medical equipment is limited: There is only one x-ray machine and no radiologist. There are long wait times to see a doctor, and the obstetrics department is mostly run by midwives. During the COVID-19 pandemic in Botswana, the Scottish Livingstone Hospital had to scale its services down due to overcrowding but set up their own dedicated COVID-19 unit.

== See also ==
- Alfred Merriweather
