= Witsie's Cave (Lekhalong la Witsie) =

Sacred site in the Free State, South Africa

Witsie’s cave
- Location: Witsieshoek, Free State
- Nearest city: QwaQwa and Clarens
- Area: Witsieshoek
- Established: Declared a Provincial Heritage Site in 2016

Witsie’s cave (Lehaeng la Wetsi) is a sacred site in the Free State and is named after the grandson of Chief Seeka of Makholokoe. The cave is largely associated with Makholokoe – a tribe of the Basotho and has a rich history relating to this tribe, as well as the interactions between blacks and Boers in the 1800s. The cave has been claimed by Makholokoe as an important imprint in their history and is an important landmark in the Province.

== The Makholokoe ==
The Makholokoe arrived in Qwaqwa around 1800 led by Matebe (Wetsi) (also spelled Oetsi or Wetsie). They left a place called Thaba Kholokoe which is near Standerton in Mpumalanga, and settled at Thaba Kholo near Bethlehem, Free State. Wetsi then went ahead to look for another place and that is when he decided that he and his people would settle in Wetsieshoek . They first moved at the foot of a mountain called Fika Patso (Split Rock) before moving to Mohlomong near where the old Qwaqwa government building was situated which now seats the offices of the Thabo Mofutsanyana District Municipality. It was while living in Mohlomong that Wetsi discovered a cave near Monontsha Village. This cave became a cattle post during the seasons.

In 1856 King Wetsi was dispossessed of the land by the Free State Dutch government and a big war ensued between Makholokoe and the Dutch, Wetsi used the cave as a fortress and the boers bombed the cave, killing many of Makholokoe inside. Wetsi managed to escape with some of Makholokoe and escaped to Lesotho where he joined Poka II son of Molupi of the senior branch of Makholokoe. It is after then that the cave was named after him and the area Wetsieshoek.

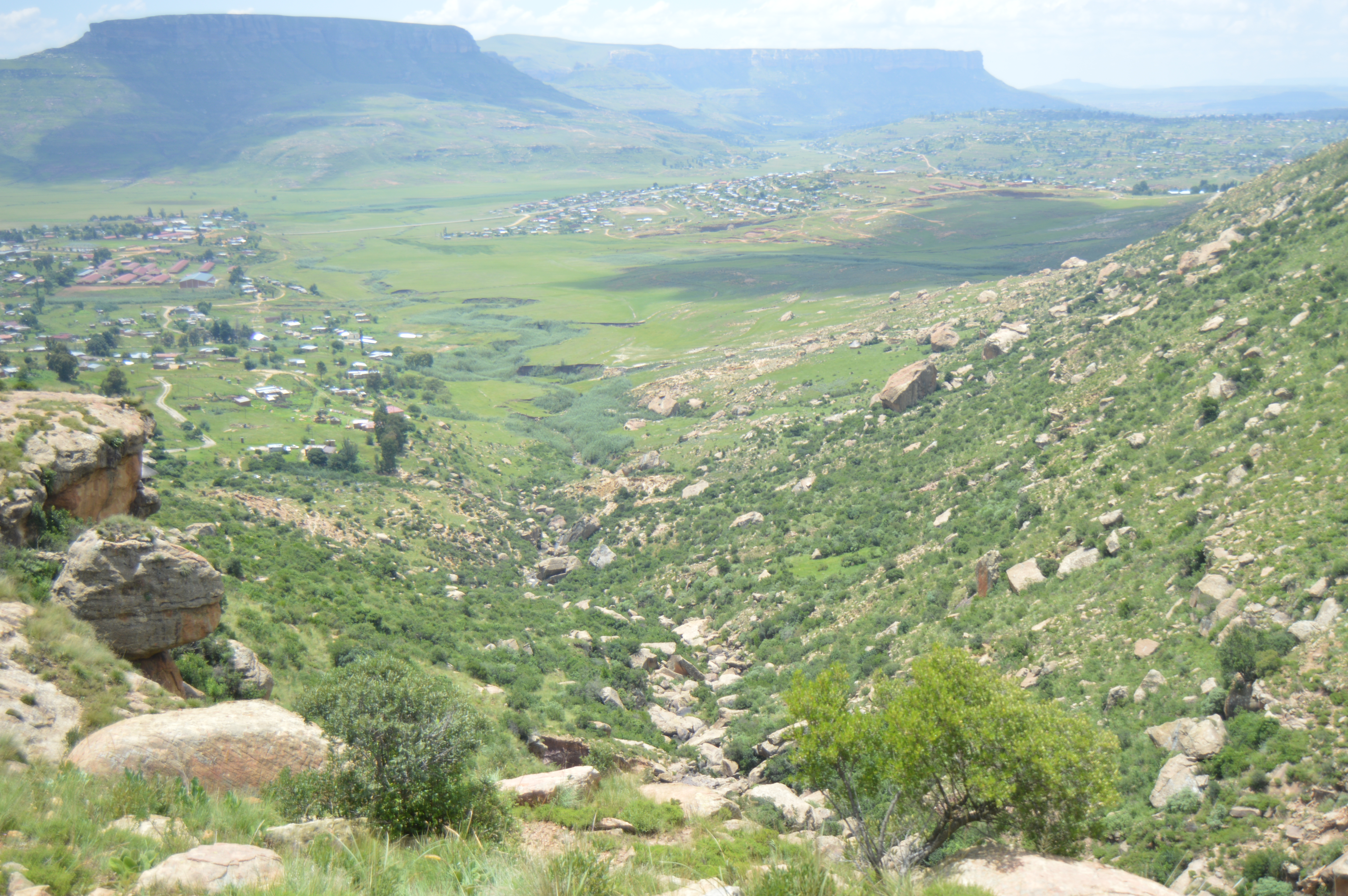
View of Witsieshoek from the cave Witsieshoek.

The community of Makholokoe that is found in the Eastern Free State today is the second generation of Witsie, the grandson of Chief Seka Moloi father to Wetsi The Genealogy of Makholokoe is as follows:

- Akhosi
- Lehasa
- Seka
- Wetsi
- Lephatsoana(First son)
- Mokibiliti
- Sekgese
- MakausuI
- Mabuti
- Makausi II

== Interaction with Voortrekkers ==
Voortrekker settlers moved closer to where Witsieshoek (Afrikaans meaning Witsies se Hoek, ie Witsie’s corner.) was situated, establishing their farms along the boundaries. At first, these two groups lived well side-by-side. This area was first known as Phofung (meaning the place of the elands), due to a large number of elands found in the area. The place became popularised by Boers as Witsieshoek meaning Witsies se Hoek – Witsie’s corner. The Boer and the Makholokoe had a close trading relationship, through a system called Mafisa. This was a process where a man with many cattle, would lend some to a poor man who would use the milk of the cattle and keep the calves; which afforded him the opportunity to farm his own. In return, the poor man would take care of the cattle of the rich man and owe him loyalty. This system was popularised by King Moshoeshoe during the Mfecane/Difaqane Wars. According to Toeba Moloi (local historian from Qwaqwa) the Boers did not keep their promise of returning the cattle loaned to them by Makholokoe. This is viewed as the reason for the conflict between the two parties.

A battle soon ensued between Makholokoe and the Boer farmers over the issue of cattle being stolen. Farmers reported Witsie to Major HD Warden, who was in charge of the Orange Free State after it was annexed by the British in 1848. Warden then gave orders to Witsie to instruct his people to return the allegedly stolen cattle, but Witsie refused, denying the allegations. Warden then ordered Witsie and his people to vacate the area. King Moshoeshoe was called in to intervene. He requested Witsie to return the stolen cattle, for the sake of peace, and he offered him land to settle in Lesotho with his followers. Wetsie declined the offer. Complaints about the Makholokoe’s raiding and lifting kept flooding the office of Joseph Orpen who was the Volksraad representative in Harrismith. On 12 May 1856, two years after the signing of the Bloemfontein Convention (the agreement through which the British authorities handed the Voortrekkers in the Orange River Sovereignty in 1854), the order to expel Witsie and his people was executed. A republican ‘armed expedition’ led by Commandant LR Botha and Field-Cornet FJ Senekal, drove the Makholokoe from Witsieshoek and captured their cattle, horses and sheep. Two expeditions were sent, one being in May and the other in June of the same year. This marked the first armed conflict between the whites and blacks in the area. Wetsie was forced to retreat.

== Significance of the cave ==
Witsie used this cave as a hideout after he and his people were attacked by the Boers. The Makholokoe were trapped, with the intention of starving them. Once Witsie realised that his resources were being exhausted, he snuck out during the night with his family and trusted headmen. They used the horse shoe-shaped cavern to escape into Lesotho. King Moshoeshoe I then gave them land on Likgoele in what is now the district of Mafeteng. While attempting to surrender, his people were then shot at, while some managed to escape. Their livestock were also captured.

It is believed that Witsie was a healer and rainmaker and therefore the cave has become a sacred site due to it being used in the past for spiritual rituals. There are claims that in the pile of stones found at the entrance to the cave, lies the remains of some people who perished during the attack. In 2016 the cave was declared a provincial heritage site in the Free State by the Free State Provincial Heritage Resources Authority. The cave has been referred to as a ‘fortress’ or ‘stronghold’ of the Makholokoe forefathers.

== See also ==
- QwaQwa
- Phuthaditjhaba
