= Byneskranskop =

Archaeological site in South Africa

- location in South Africa
- 34°36′37″S 19°26′15″E
- Region: South Africa

Byneskranskop is an archaeological site in present-day South Africa where the coastal plain meets the southern Cape Fold Belt. Neolithic human remains have been discovered in caves at the site. Carbon dating of the remains indicates the bodies date from 3,000 to 2,000 years BCE.

Remains of tortoises at this site and a dig at Die Kelders, have been used to assess a correlation between tortoise size and human population, with a decrease in tortoise sizes as the human population grows.

166,000 stone artefacts were recovered from the site during the first dig. These were dated as far back as 12,000 years BCE. Pottery sherds were limited to the period of 250 years BCE or later.
