= Ngalue =

Archaeological site in Mozambique

- location in Mozambique
- 12°30′54″S 35°7′8.4″E
- Periods: Middle Stone Age
- Location: Niassa province
- Region: Mozambique

Site notes
- Excavation dates: 2007
- Archaeologists: Julio Mercader

Ngalue Cave is an archaeological site located in the Niassa province of Mozambique. Excavated primarily by Julio Mercader in 2007, Ngalue is a Middle Stone Age site. Due to its relatively dry environment and the shape of the cave, Ngalue had very good preservation and not only were stone tools and animal bones found. There were preserved starch grains on many of the stone tools as well. Overall, this site can help add to our knowledge of the Middle Stone Age site in the Niassa valley and to our understanding of the subsistence of Middle Stone Age peoples in Eastern Africa as a whole.

== The site ==
The cave is made of dolomite marble and the mouth stretches inward before expanding into a wider cave. The cave is labeled with a few main parts, lower bed 1, lower bed 2, the middle bed, and the hearth beds. The latter three sections contained the largest number of artifacts and the middle beds in particular provided much of the information gained during and after excavation. Using radiocarbon dating, uranium series dating, and electron spin resonance dating, the time period of human occupation in the cave has been accurately dated to between 105 and 40 thousand years ago.

== Tools ==
There were 727 total stone artifacts found at the Ngalue Cave site. 555 of these artifacts were found in the middle beds of the cave. Most of these tools were made of quartz material brought in from the surrounding area. The tools display discoidal reduction and are usually handheld tools, although some of the smaller tools were braced. Cores were common, flakes were not as present, and there were formal tools at the site. Along with stone axes, there were also scrapers and awls. There were a few special objects as well. These include a rhyolite grinder, a rhyolite ground cobble, and a faceted quartz core tool. All three of these objects had an ochre pigment on them, giving a red/ orange appearance and one had a patina over it. The tools from the Niassa region, including those of Ngalue, are different from anywhere else. Late Middle Stone Age tool technology like Still Bay, Howiesons Poort, and blade technology are not seen in the Niassa region, at least not at any known sites.

== Starch ==
Starch analysis of stone tools in forested and relatively damp areas in Africa has been difficult due to a lack of preservation. However, there are a few ways that microbotanicals can preserve in environments like this. Quartz is a material that encapsulates materials and the silt around it allows rapid molecular bonding. Because of this preservation by the quartz, the stone tools in Ngalue cave were able to be analyzed for evidence of the use of starch in the diets of the Middle Stone Age population in the area.

Julio Mercader chose approximately 12% of the stone tools found in the cave to be analyzed. The results were promising. The tools had two hundred and seventy times the number of starch granules than the sediments around it. The tools also contained one hundred twenty-five times the number of granules as the topsoil sampled outside the cave had.

Out of all of the grains recovered 89% were sorghum. 3.5% were from woody plants specifically matching samples of certain seeds legumes and nuts. 3% of the total assemblage were pear shaped starches whose closest match is the trunk of the African wine palm. Another starch was from the African false banana and the evidence for this starch was restricted to a grinder, a core axe, and a Levallois flake. The last starch found was 12 clusters of fused granules whose closest match is the African potato. The analysis of this data shows that the environment in the Middle Stone Age was densely wooded with a tall grass understory.

== Importance ==
Ngalue Cave excavations have lent themselves toward a number of research paths that could better our understanding of the human record. The stone tools from Ngalue were dated with absolute dating techniques, and this was the first time Middle Stone Age lithics had been dated in northern Mozambique. This site can also help archaeologists to understand past ecosystems and the movement of humans through Africa in the Middle Stone Age.

== Other sites ==
There is an abundance of evidence for sites in northern Mozambique, especially Middle Stone Age sites. For example, Nuno Bicho and team found evidence for over 90 paleolithic sites in the area in only 20 days of fieldwork. Despite this, extensive research has not been done in the area. Two sites other than Ngalue, Mvumu and Mikuyu, have been excavated. At both sites the lithic technology was very similar with quartz being the main raw material. It seems that this trend, visible at Ngalue as well, continued from 105 to 29 thousand years ago. The lack of comparable data makes it difficult to draw conclusions about subsistence, chronology, or technology from the MSA evidence in the area. How and why the Niassa region is different from sites with similar dates around the continent is an interesting topic for future research.
