= Mumbwa Caves =

Archaeological site in Zambia

Mumbwa Caves are archaeological sites in the miombo woodlands of central Zambia. Excavations have recovered stone tools, ochre, hearths, animal remains, and possible bone tools from deposits reaching 8 m deep. These deposits document episodes of human activity between the Middle Pleistocene and Late Holocene, including material related to Middle Stone Age and Later Stone Age occupations. Iron Age farming communities settled in the surrounding area during the Late Holocene. The caves continue to hold significance for the local Kaonde people.

== Excavations ==
Macrae 1926; Clark 1942; Savage 1983. In 1931, Dart and Del Grande excavated the caves and discovered intact basal deposits which were used to date the site. In 1993, Lawrence Barham gathered a team represented by the Zambian National Heritage Conservation Commission, the Livingstone Museum and the Universities of Bristol and Oxford to assess the extent of intact basal deposits discovered by Dart and Del Grande.

== Artifacts ==
A 62,614 lithics were recovered in 1994. 3,171 were from the Iron Age deposit, 16,939 from the LSA (Late Stone Age) and 40,060 from the upper MSA (Middle Stone Age) sequence. Several general patterns have been observed from these artifacts. It is evident that there are patterns within the raw materials used, the manipulation of manuports and in the production of bone tools. Hearths and windbreaks have been found at Mumbwa and are evidence of the emergence of complex Middle Stone Age behaviors being used by past people of Mumbwa. Windbreaks bend away from the tunnel and would have protected the occupants of the cave and their hearths from the east to west winds. Microfauna found at the site indicates dry conditions at the time of occupation.

== Features ==
There are two main classes of features that can be found at the Mumbwa Caves site. Hearths and windbreaks are two features which are distinctive of the Mumbwa Middle Stone Age. The hearths found in Areas I and II, have stone borders consisting of cave dolomite blocks and material transported from local landscape, including quartz cobbles, phyllite, sandstone and cobbles of haematite. Area I contains one of the best preserved windbreaks on the Mumbwa Caves site. It is distinguished by a semi-circular arc of ash, sediment, quartz debitage and animal bone.
