= Mamuno Monument =

The Mamuno monument also known as Kangumene rock engravings is a historical site in Botswana located north west of the border post called Mamuno border which enters Namibia in a district called Ghanzi district.

There are many different engravings at Mamuno ranging from print outs to geometrical designs. Types of print out include the animals and human prints on stone walls.
