= Molepolole =

- Village
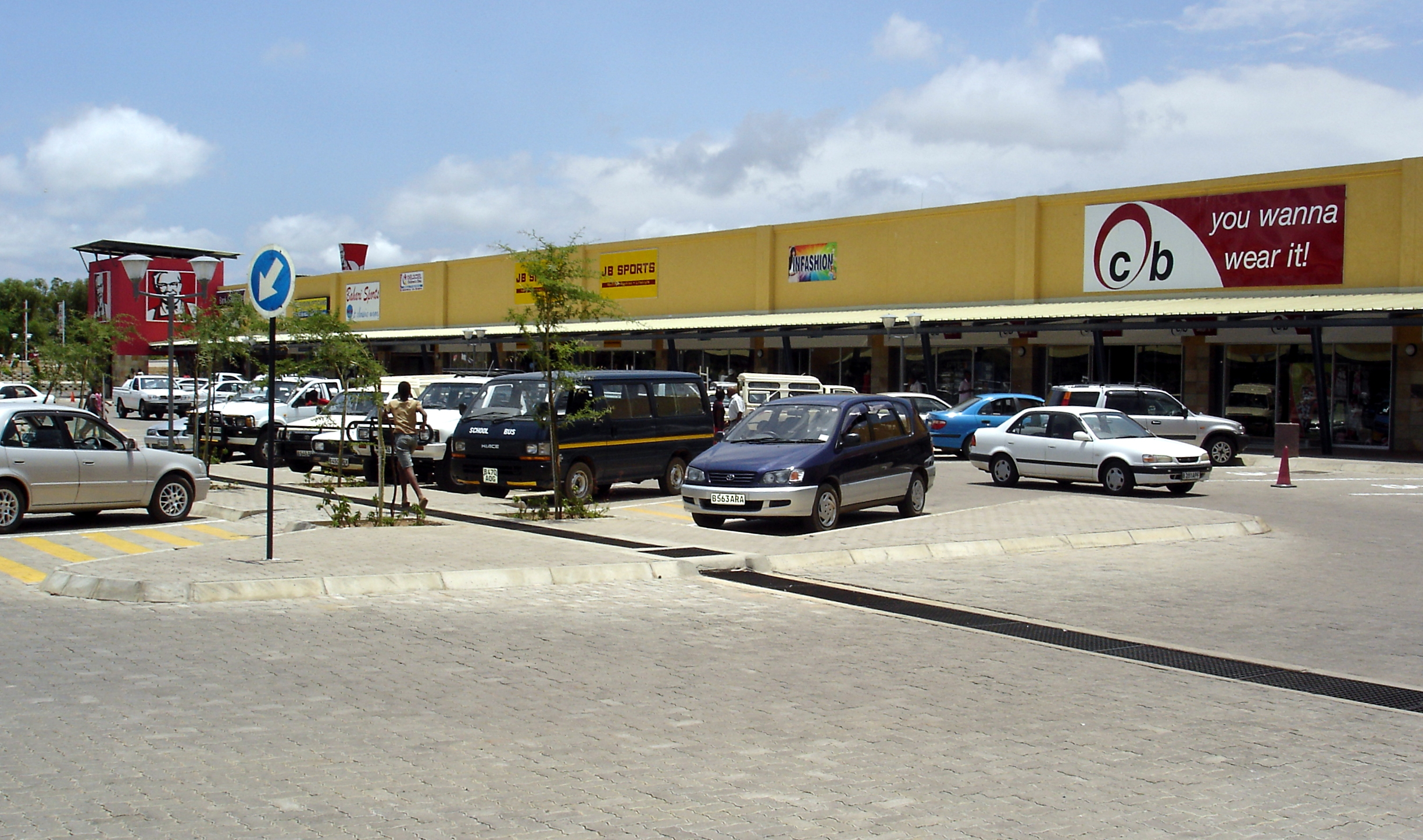
- Mafenyatlala Shopping Mall
- Nicknames: phuase, phua lerole, moleps
- Location in Botswana
- Coordinates: 24°24′10″S 25°30′50″E
- Country: Botswana
- District: Kweneng District
- Sub-district: Molepolole
- Elevation: 1,189 m (3,901 ft)

Population (2022)
  - Total: 74,674
- Time zone: UTC+02:00 (CAT)
- Area code: 5
- ISO 3166 code: BW-KW
- Climate: BSh

Molepolole is a large village in Kweneng District, Botswana.

The people who reside in Molepolole are called Bakwena, who are one of the eight major tribes in Botswana. The Bakwena Kgosi (Chief), Sebele I was among the three chiefs who went to England to seek protection from the British in the colonial era. Molepolole serves as the capital of the Bakwena. It was named after the Molepolole River.

It is one of the largest traditional villages in Africa with a population of over 74,674 people as of 2022. It lies 50 kilometres west of the national capital Gaborone and acts as gateway for exploring the Kalahari Desert.

It has a large traditional kgotla and the Scottish Livingstone Hospital.

== History ==
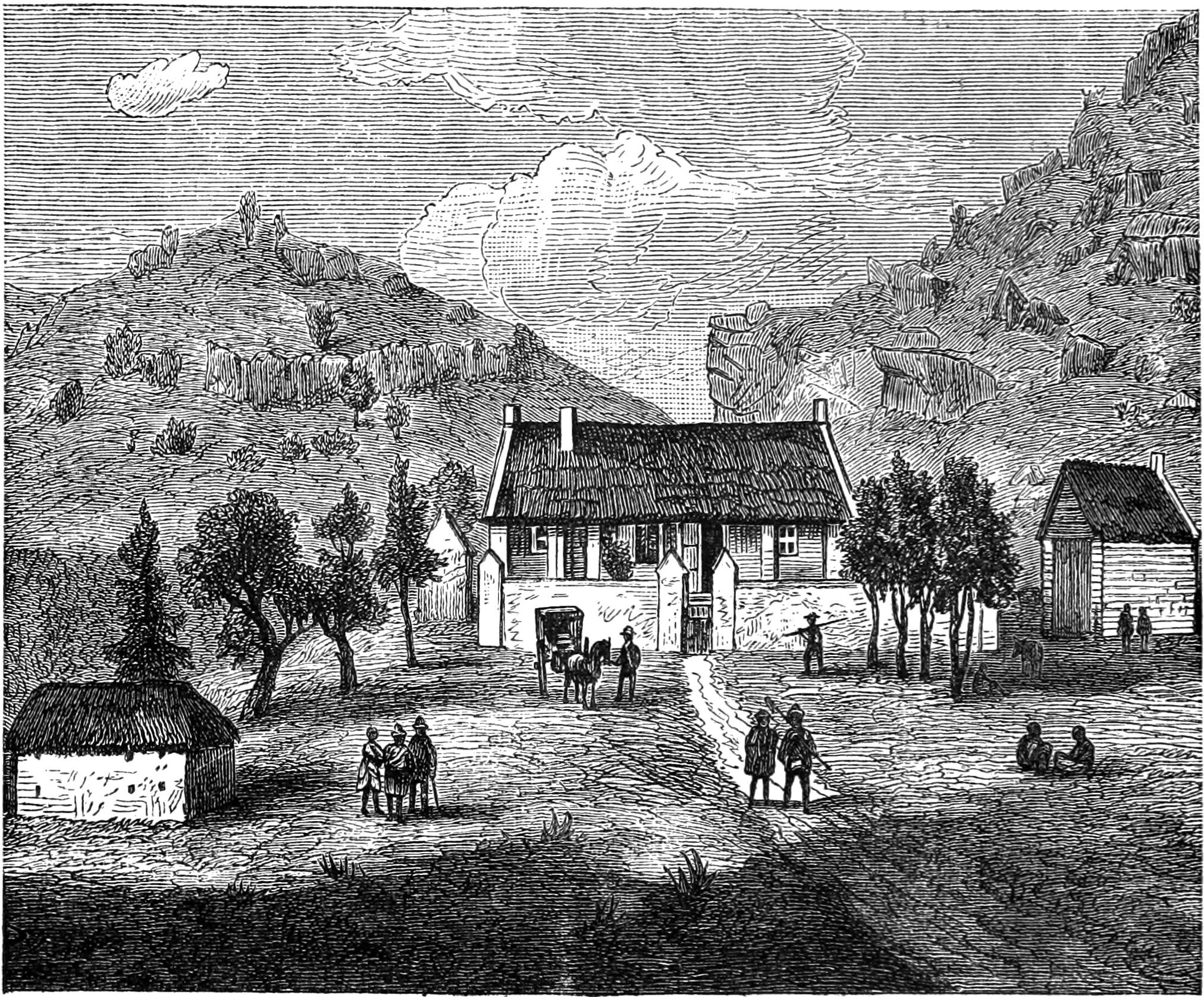
Mission house in Molepolole, 1870s

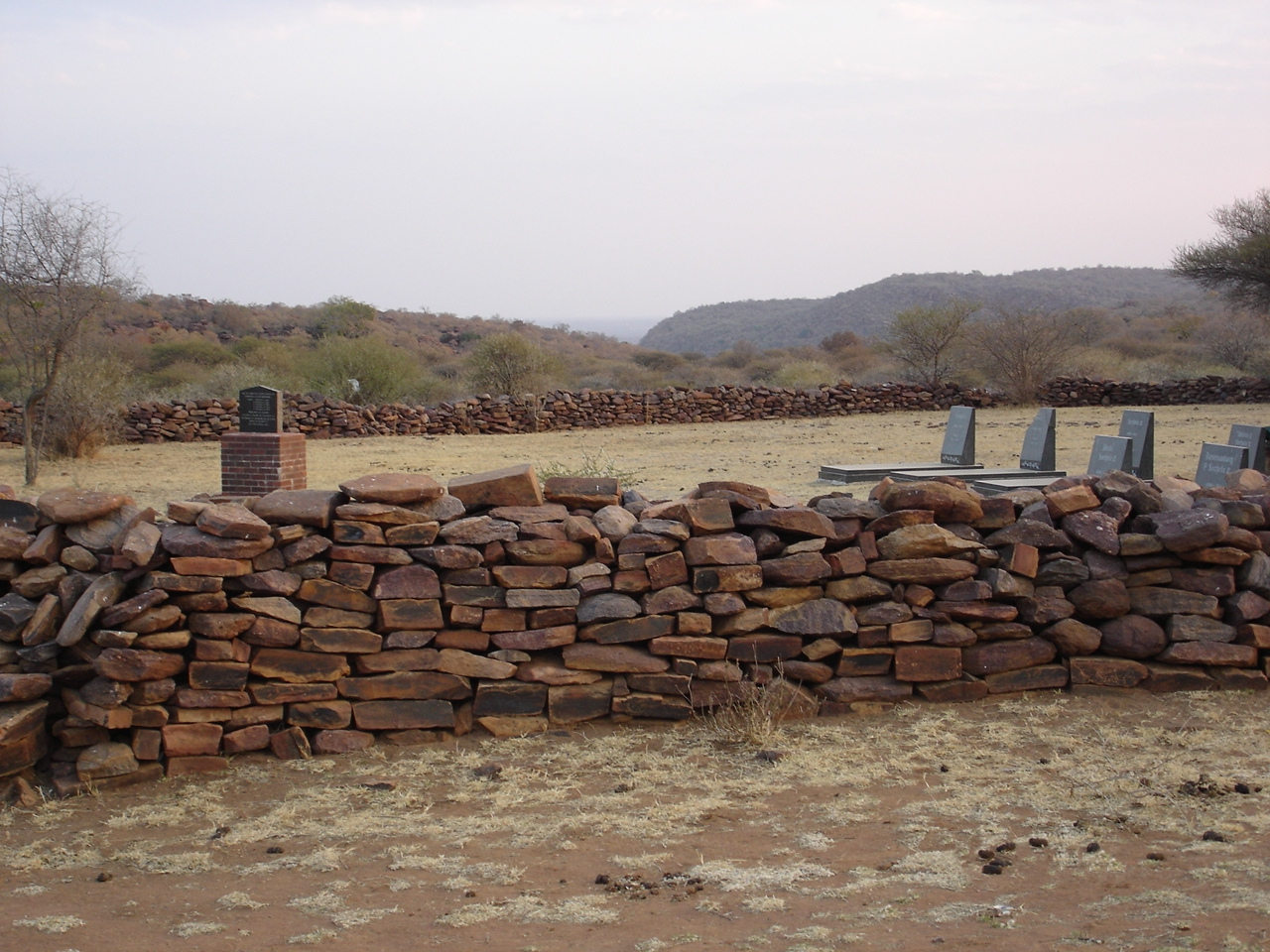
Bakwena Royal Cemetery, formerly a royal kraal at Ntsweng

Ntsweng was the capital of Bakwena before they moved to Molepolole. Ntsweng is a historic site located a few kilometers southeast of Molepolole. The area was first occupied by Bakwena, led by Sechele I (ruled 1829–92), in 1864. It was abandoned in 1937 when Bakwena were forced to move to Molepolole by Kgari II, assisted by the colonial administrators. Ntsweng today consists of a large area covered with traces of occupation. Most notable are the patterns of stones laid on their edges that form house foundations which are still visible on the surface. There are also the ruins of what used to be Sebele II's office which is at present referred to as Mmakgosi's house. The ruins of that building are situated next to an area which used to be the royal kraal at Ntsweng but is now the royal cemetery. Several clusters of ruins seem to represent different wards. Analyses of the settlement layout and soil samples suggest cattle were often kept in the center of each ward. This seems to follow the "central cattle pattern", a conceptual model for the organization of settlements among southern Bantu, where the central placement of the kraal reflects the central role of cattle in the culture and ideology of the people.

== Government and infrastructure ==
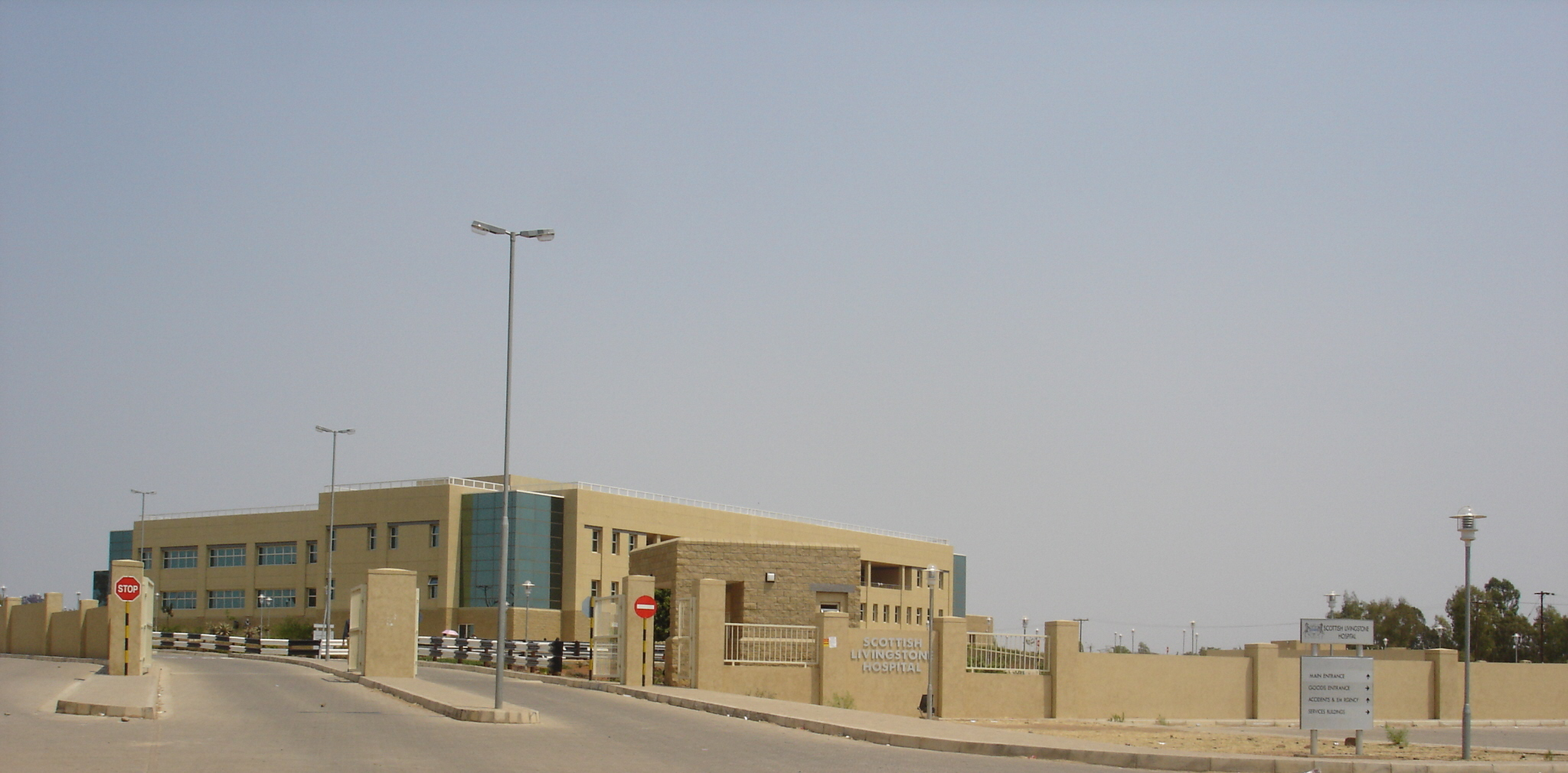
Scottish Livingston Hospital

- The Botswana Prison Service (BPS) operates the Molepolole Prison.
- Molepolole Police Station
- Scottish Livingston Hospital
- Mafenyatlala Mall
- Molepolole Stadium

== Education ==
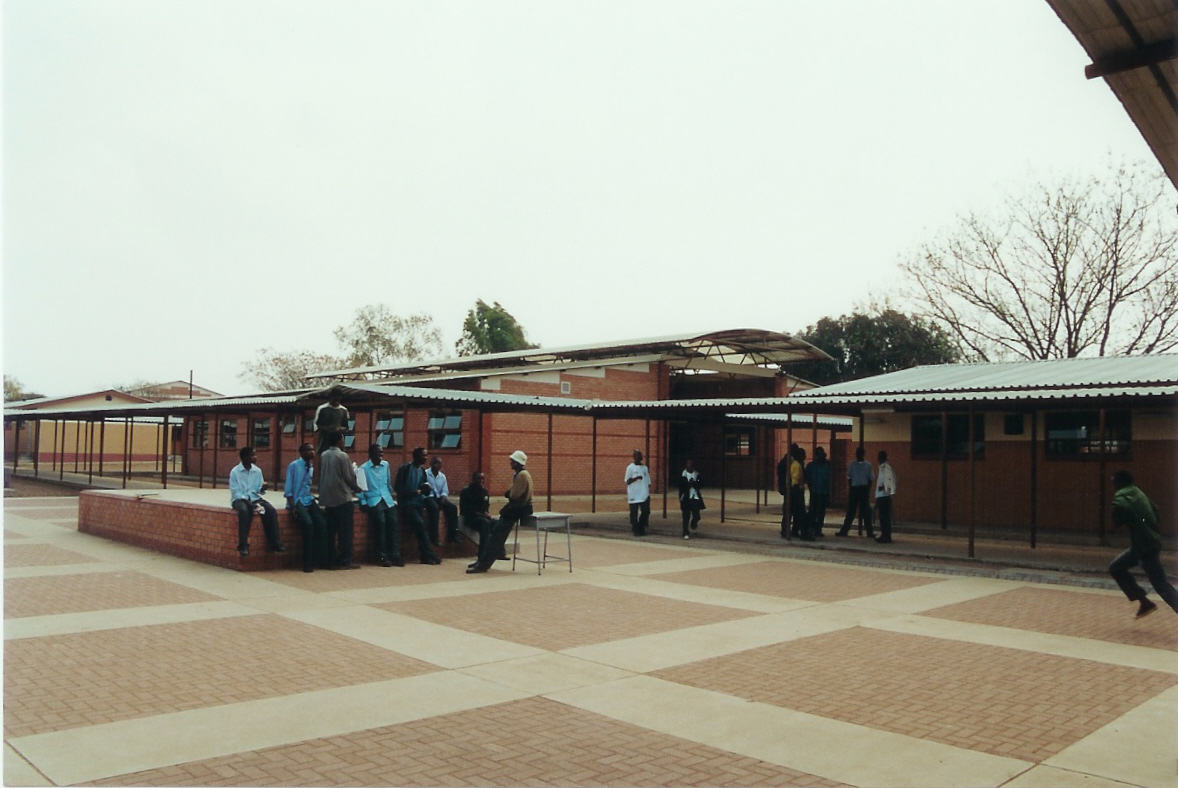
Kgari Sechele Secondary School

Molepolole is the home to a number of educational institutions that offers education from primary school to tertiary level. The tertiary institutions in Molepolole include Molepolole College of Education which offers diploma in education and Institute of Health Sciences which offers diploma in Nursing. Kgari Sechele Senior Secondary School is the only government-run senior secondary school in Molepolole and it offers Botswana General Certificate of Secondary Education (BGCSE).

There are 8 government-run junior secondary schools in Molepolole namely:

- Masilo Junior Secondary School,
- Boitshoko Junior Secondary School,
- Kwena-Sereto Junior Secondary School,
- Sedumedi Junior Secondary School,
- Motswasele Junior Secondary School,
- Tshegetsang Junior Secondary School,
- Dithejwane Junior Secondary School and
- Moruakgomo Junior Secondary School.

There are 17 government run primary schools in Molepolole namely;

- Phuthadikobo Primary School,
- Bokaa Primary School,
- Magokotswane Primary School,
- Suping Primary School,
- Kutlwano Primary School,
- Boribamo Primary School,
- Neale Primary School,
- Bakwena National Primary School,
- Kealeboga Primary School,
- Sebele Primary School,
- Lewis Memorial Primary School,
- Bonewamang Primary School,
- Cannon Gordon Memorial Primary School,
- Borakalalo Primary School,
- Lephaleng Primary School,
- Louw Primary School and
- Lekgwapheng Primary School.

Private schools include Bluebows English medium school which offers pre-school, primary school and secondary school and Kweneng International Secondary School. The other 4 privately owned schools are Shepherd English Medium, Al-haq English Medium, Kgomotso English Medium Primary School (now Regent Hill) and Emmanuel Adventist Academy (formerly Meadows English Medium) which offer pre-primary and primary education only. There is also Nampol Technical College which is a privately run tertiary institution.

== Vegetation found in Molepolole ==
Molepolole is the home to many species of plants that thrive in the semi-arid environment.

Some of the plants found in Molepolole

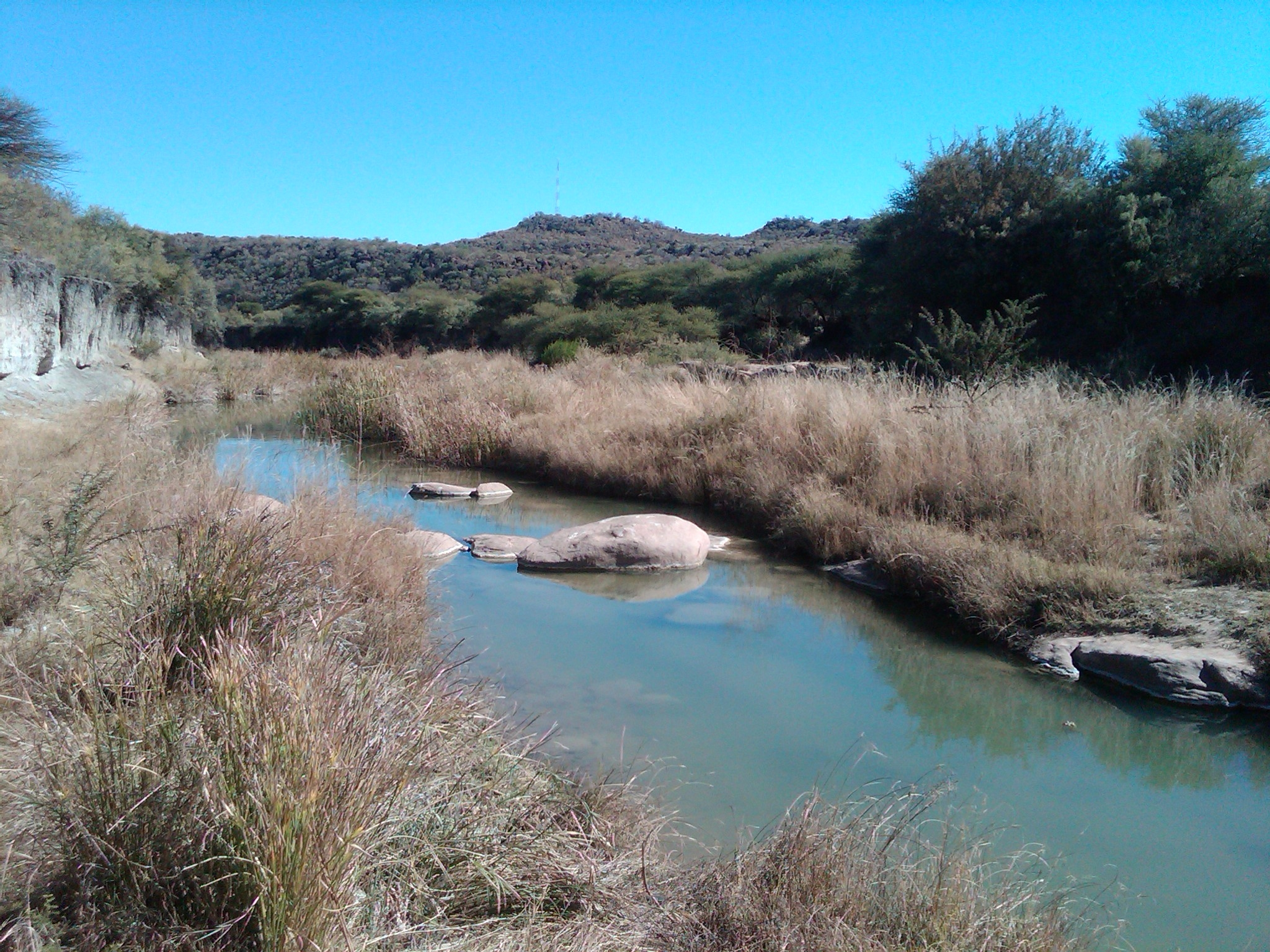
Mokgopeetsane River in Molepolole

== Sites of interest ==
- Maphefo - This is an abandoned Kwena village site, situated 32–40 km (20–25 mi) north-northeast of Molepolole.
- Maokagane Hills - Near "Kopong" caves. Among these hills are a) an iron smelting site; b) rock paintings and c) the Lowe cave at Kopong.
- Ga Kala - in the Kopong hills. Old mining site about an hour's walk SE of Lentswe-le-tau, north of the Mochudi-Molepolole road. Lentswe-le-tau - An iron smelting site.
- Kopong Hills - A cave; rock engravings in the hills and rock engravings some 29 km (18 mi) north of Molepolole. Also Kopong water caves.
- Molepolole - a) Execution Rock - Kobokwe; b) Sokwane, grave of Motswasele II situated NE of Molepolole; c) Footprints on the rock in Molepolole Hill; d) Burial cairns of Sechele I, Sebele I and Sebele II on kraal site of old Molepolole village site where Sebele I also stayed with favourite wife after village had moved to Borakalalo 1899/1900.
- Borakalalo - a) Molepolole since 1899/1900; b) LMS Church in Borakalalo; c) Anglican Church built 1916.
- Mokgophaneng - Sebele's cattle post and settlement of some Bakwena who left Molepolole Hill.
- Legaga La Ga Kabokwe - Livingstone and Sechele's Cave about 3 km (2 mi) from Molepolole on Molepolole-Thamaga road. This cave is said to be the home of a spirit.
- Dithubaruba - Kwena capital after Dimawe and Kolobeng; Livingstone arrived here in 1853.
- Dithejwane - Situated 13 km (8 mi) SSW of Molepolole on Kanye road. Has stone wall and hut foundation remains.
- Kolobeng Mission - a) Old Kwena capital until 1853. Dam on Kolobeng River for irrigation; b) Livingstone's house and workshop; c) Sechele's square house designed by Livingstone; d) Grave of Elizabeth Livingstone born and died there 1850.
- Dimawe - Old Kwena capital after Kolobeng, settled in August 1851 and attacked by Boers in August 1852.
- Letlhakeng Valley - Rock engravings.
- Kobokwe Cave - A cave in the hill along Molepolole-Thamaga Road

== See also ==
- List of cities in Botswana
