= Sebele II =

Kwena chief (1892–1939)

- Sebele II in 1918
- Born: 1892
- Died: 2 October 1939 (aged 46–47)
- Title: Kgosi of the Bakwena
- Term: 1918–1939 (de jure); 1918–1931 (de facto)
- Predecessor: Sechele II
- Successor: Kgari Sechele II
- Children: Moruakgomo Sechele
- Father: Sechele II

Kelebantse Sebele a Sechele II (1892 – 2 October 1939), known as Sebele II, was chief, or kgosi, of the Kwena tribe in the Bechuanaland Protectorate (present-day Botswana) from 1918 to 1931. He succeeded his father, Sechele II. Though popular among the people, Sebele was challenged by members of his family and the British colonial administration throughout his reign. His tolerance of traditional religious practices like polygamy and the bogwera rite of passage made him an enemy of the Christian tribal headmen and the London Missionary Society. Many attempts were made by colonial leaders to undermine his popularity, criticising Sebele as a violent alcoholic and forming Tribal Councils made up of his opponents. As kgosi, Sebele led several infrastructure projects and collected grain and cattle to give to the poor.

Sebele was exiled by the colonial administration in 1931, in an effort led by Resident Commissioner Charles Rey, when he was accused of corruption and oppression. His removal incited anger among the Kwena tribes people, the Bakwena, who continued recognising him as the legitimate kgosi. He was succeeded by his younger brother Kgari Sechele II, who was appointed by Rey despite his not being next in the line of succession. Sebele's son Moruakgomo Sechele became a pretender, triggering a succession crisis in 1962.

== Early life and family ==
Kelebantse Sebele a Sechele II was born in 1892 as the son of Sechele II, kgosi of the Kwena tribe. He had an elder sister, Padi, and younger brothers, Tumagole, Kgari, Kgwanyakgwanyang, and Neale. Sebele attended secondary school at the Tiger Kloof Educational Institute for one year before dropping out of school. He moved to Witwatersrand in 1912, where he worked as a mining clerk until 1916. In this environment, he saw poor living conditions around the mines and the urbanisation of Johannesburg, which were not typically experienced by the tribe's political leaders. He enlisted in the South African Native Labour Corps in 1917 and fought in France during World War I as a corporal. Black soldiers were mistreated by white officers, and Sebele came to distrust white populations during this time. He was introduced to members of the British royal family while in Paris. He was sent home with all of the black personnel after other units had struggled with white officers. Sebele took a woman named Tlhalefang as his senior wife.

== Kgosi of the Bakwena ==
=== Ascension and internal conflict ===
Ntsweng, then-capital of the Kwena tribe, in present-day Botswana

Sebele became kgosi of the Bakwena on 12 February 1918. He was the first kgosi of the Bakwena who could read English. Sebele faced the same opposition that had plagued his father Sechele. Sebele's uncles, Kebohula and Moiteelasilo, had split from the tribe and remained at the Borakalalo Valley with their supporters when Sechele moved the tribe's capital to the neighbouring Ntsweng. A Tribal Council was created by the colonial administration in opposition to Sebele's father, with Kebohula and Moiteelasilo as members. The tribe's headmen—many of whom were Sebele's uncles and cousins—filed complaints against him to the administration, but they remained a minority. Such complaints were filed numerous times throughout the 1920s, but each time it was determined that his popularity among commoners prevented removal. Another faction that had separated from the rule of Sebele's father, the followers of Jacoba a Kgari, reunited with the Bakwena and came under Sebele's rule.

Sebele's opponents lambasted him as a reactionary and a neotraditionalist. Disagreements between headmen and commoners, as well as between neotraditionalists and Christians, had been ongoing for generations within the Bakwena. The headmen were predominantly Christian and objected to the protection of tribal religious practices. They also had personal reasons for opposing Sechele and Sebele, who had allowed the promotions of junior tribal headmen and even commoners as advisors over senior headmen. This was a response to the London Missionary Society and its hold over the senior headmen. Sebele resisted his advisors and councillors, wishing to avoid any delegation or curtailing of his powers. He developed a reputation among his opponents for being irresponsible as kgosi, and he was seen as unduly harsh, earning him the nickname kgoma ya tlhaba (transl. wild ox). He was known for his frequent consumption of alcohol and the anger he expressed while drunk. In one incident at a kgotla meeting, he was asked whether he would give up drinking, and he is quoted as saying "I shall keep drinking, I don't want to tell lies". Sebele also had frequent sexual partners to the point that both allies and critics considered it a problem that affected his work.

Sebele temporarily stepped away from his duties in 1925. Instead, his uncle Kebohula, whom the colonial administration deemed more responsible and cooperative, served as acting kgosi, . A dispute between Sebele and Kebohula occurred in 1927 when Sebele accused Kebohula of witchcraft. Three days of deliberation ended with Kebohula's banishment, but the colonial administration overruled the decision. It then passed a proclamation banning both witchcraft and the accusations of witchcraft.

=== Colonial opposition ===
While the British colonial administration faced several dikgosi that they found problematic, Sebele was their greatest concern. Sebele resisted the control that the British Empire exercised over the tribe. Britain's Resident Commissioner James MacGregor expressed dismay over Sebele's ascension as kgosi, describing him as unstable and alcoholic to his direct superior, the High Commissioner, and requesting that Sebele's formal confirmation be postponed. The confirmation was delayed indefinitely and never took place. Several British magistrates complained about Sebele, saying that he oppressed his citizens and ignored the wishes of the colonial government. The colonial administration hoped to ignore the line of succession and install Sebele's brother Kgari, a supporter of their uncle Moiteelasilo, as kgosi.

Sebele found himself in confrontation with MacGregor in May 1920 when MacGregor publicly demanded that Sebele relocate the Bakwena back to Borakalalo, threatening Sebele with removal after being rebuffed. Sebele then agreed to relocate the tribe, but months went by without action, so the colonial administration revoked his hut tax commission. Sebele then avoided contact with the administration, refusing to attend the Native Advisory Council or any meetings that were called. The 1921 Native Advisory Council was attended mainly by headmen of the various tribes who sided with Sebele's opponents. After considering a trial for Sebele on the charge of ignoring his advisors, they instead decided to create a British-backed Tribal Council to oversee governance of the Bakwena. The council was similar to one that had been used against Sebele's father, with his uncles Kebohula and Moiteelasilo returning as members. Sebele aligned with businessman B. I. Vickerman, a member of the European Advisory Council. Several of the European Advisory Council's members objected to the colonial administration's treatment of Sebele and its support of his opponents in Borakalalo. This backlash prompted the High Commissioner of Britain's territories to overturn MacGregor's actions until a "substantial majority" of the tribe supported them.

Further attempts to turn the people against Sebele were made by Resident Commissioner Jules Ellenberger and Resident Magistrate Almar Gordon Stigand. They accused Sebele in 1925 of beating citizens outside of the kgotla meeting place and of hesitancy in levying fines for the benefit of parents whose daughters were impregnated in seduction cases. They made another attempt in 1926 by charging Sebele on allegations that he had beaten his mistress. Neither incident affected Sebele's popular support. Sebele then tried to challenge Stigand's authority in 1927, after Stigand accidentally shot a citizen. Ellenberger and his successor Rowland Daniel each pushed for new Tribal Councils but could not gain support among the Bakwena. Daniel formed the third Tribal Council in 1928 despite a lack of support, but its only effect was to seize funds that were going toward Sebele before realising that the funds had been borrowed against. Daniel formed the fourth Tribal Council in 1929 with the same members, but it too was ineffective.

Sebele was one of the dikgosi involved with efforts to limit British power over the Bechuanaland Protectorate in 1927 along with Tshekedi Khama and Ntebogang Ratshosa, and the colonial administration feared that they were gaining influence over two other dikgosi, Bathoen II and Molefi. Sebele also angered the colonial administration when he resisted its efforts to exempt Europeans from tribal law. The colonial administration was unsatisfied with Sebele's oversight of the hut tax, feeling that he was not doing enough to enforce its payment. He was accused of taking £200 of the tax for himself in 1923, and the administration assumed responsibility for its collection in 1929.

Charles Rey was appointed Resident Commissioner in 1930 to impose control over dikgosi like Sebele. Rey complained that Sebele was corrupt and that he refused to preside over disputes or settled them based on favouritism and bribery. He described Sebele as "a drunken dissolute ruffian" and said that he expected he would "have to depose him before long". Rey abandoned the previous strategy of leveraging headmen who opposed Sebele. The administration said that Sebele was afflicted with syphilis and alcoholism that impaired his ability to serve as kgosi. Resident Magistrate Howard Neale incorrectly advised him that the native peoples were fatalists and would accept any change in leadership imposed by the administration.

=== Policies ===
The greatest point of contention under Sebele's reign was religion. The London Missionary Society, which held influence over many Bakwena headmen, objected to several practices that were permitted by the Bakwena. Sebele's father had already allowed Anglicanism to be practised by the Bakwena, challenging the London Missionary Society's monopoly on Christianity in Botswana, and he reversed the tribe's rules against polygyny, rainmaking, and bogwera. Sebele angered the Christian community further by restoring and encouraging traditional circumcision. Sebele's acceptance of these practices divided the population, with Christians standing in opposition to him. He went to Botlhapatlou in 1922 to complete his bogwera rite of passage, despite British objection to his departure and to the bogwera practice. His tribal age regiment, or mophato, underwent bogwera for several months. He was accused of forcing people to participate against their will. His regiment was named MaThubantwa, taking the name of his grandfather's regiment. Those who participated in the bogwera rite of passage with Sebele faced discrimination in the church and were prevented from attending school. Sebele tried to compromise on religious issues by asserting freedom of religion.

Infrastructure was a major focus during Sebele's reign; he set standardised building requirements, had landfills installed, ordered the use of graveyards, and oversaw the creation of roads and a British hospital. He advocated building a dam, but the idea was unsuccessful. Sebele was an advocate for community events, and he sometimes attended them to sing, dance, and play the piano. He sometimes patrolled the streets on his horse at night, wielding a riding crop to be used against anyone causing trouble.

Sebele gave special privileges to the poor, donating the produce of his chiefly grain field, or masotla, and setting aside some of the cattle that were collected as strays or through fines. He had loose policies on stray cattle, or matimela, allowing their owners extensive time to collect them, and implemented regulations on sellers of both grain and cattle. He took issue with white and Coloured blacksmiths, believing that they were overcharging; he put in place price controls and fees, and mandated that they buy firewood from within the Kwena tribe. Sebele's reign marked the beginning of reduced trade between the Bakwena and the peoples of the Kalahari Desert, and the colonial administration blamed Sebele for their reduced influence in the region over the following years. Contact was lost entirely with the village Tsetseng and was not restored until its reincorporation in 1940.

== Removal ==
Rey received authorisation from the High Commissioner to depose Sebele in October 1930, but this was overruled by the Secretary of State for Dominion Affairs that December. Rey found a pretext to remove Sebele in March 1931, when Sebele had the tribe commence the bogwera rite of passage. Rey's description of the events, which he had exaggerated to suggest participation was coerced, convinced the Dominion Affairs Secretary to allow Sebele's removal. The order to depose Sebele was given on 7 May 1931.

The administration chose to remove Sebele from the area before deposing him to avoid a risk of revolt by the Bakwena. Sebele, Kebohula, and Moiteelasilo were summoned to Mafeking, ostensibly to discuss regional water policy. They arrived on 2 June 1931, at which point Sebele was informed that he was to be banished to Ghanzi, while Kebohula and Moiteelasilo would serve on an interim council. Sebele was not afforded a trial and complained that he had not received the due process he was entitled to under the colonial law. Police kept Sebele under surveillance while he was in Mafeking, and he was not given an opportunity to contact his lawyer. Rey chose to remove Sebele indirectly, citing a 1907 proclamation that empowered him to order banishment.

The official reasons given for Sebele's removal were "the embezzlement of £200 hut tax; his oppression and misrule of Bakwena; corruption in kgotla cases; seduction of the daughter of Corporal Moses; the assault of his principal wife Tlhalefang; and neglect of his duties". Sebele left in exile on 10 June. Before leaving, he reportedly sent a message to his people reading "Retlasetswe", meaning that the tribe has been attacked or invaded. This later became a common refrain in demanding his return. The train took him to Gobabis where a crowd celebrated him before he was driven to Ghanzi.

== Exile and succession ==
I want to let you know that I have already left, even though I do not like it. I just had to follow the White man's orders. But I also want you to be aware that this does not just affect me, but you all as well, all the Chieftainships of the Northern and Southern Protectorate, and the Union. Help! Help! Help! Our land and nation is going.

— Sebele II, in a message to Tshekedi Khama on 10 June 1931

The Bakwena were outraged by Sebele's removal. Kebohula, Moiteelasilo, and their police escort were pelted with stones upon returning to Ntsweng. Rey organised a meeting of two thousand Bakwena in Molepolole on 10 June where Sebele's brother Kgari was appointed as his successor. No one at the meeting was allowed to speak Sebele's name. The people stood or raised their hands upon Kgari's appointment. Rey argued that this was an expression of support, while others said it was an act of opposition. The meeting was interrupted only once, by a man who earned cheers from the crowd when demanding Sebele's return. After Kgari was installed, many refused to attend meetings he led or to pay colonial taxes.

Rey hoped that Sebele's removal would make an example of him and discourage resistance from other dikgosi. In effect, it emboldened their resistance. Tribes in Bechuanaland and South Africa expressed their support for Sebele, demanding his return and raising legal funds. Sebele reportedly contacted several dikgosi to seek their assistance. Bathoen II and Tshekedi had the issue brought before the House of Commons of the United Kingdom. The colonial administration's official position was that it had not initiated Sebele's removal and that its only involvement was to facilitate support of an internal uprising. The administration was careful when describing the events not to use the word "deposed", instead saying that Sebele was "relieved of his functions". The United Kingdom issued a proclamation in 1934 that explicitly required chiefs to seek government approval and empowered the colonial government to remove them.

Sebele was still considered the rightful chief by the Bakwena while he was in exile, and demands for his return continued throughout his exile. Rey organised a ceremony to crown Kgari as the official kgosi on 1 September 1931, hoping to legitimise his rule. Complicating the succession was that Sebele had never been formally removed from the position, only exiled. Sebele's supporters, the BoSebele, submitted a petition to the colonial administration on 6 March 1933, demanding that Sebele be returned and his right to due process be recognised. The petition had 1,407 signatories, in contrast to the previous petitions that had been submitted against Sebele's rule, which had never accumulated more than 25 signatures. The BoSebele faced fines, unemployment, and arrest. Rey's successor Charles Arden-Clarke had homes razed in 1937 so the people would be forced to move to Kgosing where Kgari had established his capital and arrested those who did not. Sebele and Kgari's mother Phetogo was the only person to stay in Ntsweng, where she lived in the Bakwena National Office. Kgari resisted efforts to bring about his return, rejecting an offer by Sebele to formally abdicate in exchange for an end to his exile in 1938.

Sebele was popular among the people in Ghanzi, to the point that white residents feared his influence. He took a second wife, a Coloured woman named Susan Wolf, whom he married in 1928. He took a third fiancée, Senwelo-a-Jacoba, but they never wed. Sebele had two sons, both with Susan: Moruakgomo and Mokgalagadi.

Sebele died on 2 October 1939, and his body was returned to Molepolole where his funeral was attended by thousands of people. His removal fostered doubt about the Bakwena line of succession that continued for generations after his death. His death added legitimacy to Kgari's rule, but Sebele's son Moruakgomo became a pretender who received support from many who still rejected Kgari. Supporters of Bonewamang Padi Sechele, another pretender, insisted that Susan never formally married Sebele, which would make Moruakgomo illegitimate. Moruakgomo and Bonewamang were the subjects of a succession dispute after Kgari's death in 1962, which led to Sebele's brother Neale being chosen as kgosi. Sebele remained a controversial figure among the Bakwena for generations after his death as opinions on his neotraditionalist policies were split.
