= Moruakgomo Sechele =

Kwena pretender

Moruakgomo Sechele was a pretender of the Kwena tribe as the son of kgosi Sebele II. His claim to be kgosi was widely supported in 1962, but it was challenged by his cousin Bonewamang. A court decision disqualified both of them despite acknowledging their claims.

== Early life ==
Moruakgomo Sechele was born in Ghanzi to Sebele II, exiled kgosi of the Kwena tribe, and his wife Susan. His year of birth has been reported as 1932 and 1934. Moruakgomo and his younger brother Mokgalagadi were Sebele's only male heirs. In 1940, Moruakgomo and his siblings were baptised in the Anglican church in Molepolole. Sebele died in 1939, and the family moved to Tlokweng where Susan's parents lived. As the son of an exiled leader, Moruakgomo became a pretender after his father's death.

== Succession dispute ==
A succession dispute began when Bakwena kgosi Kgari Sechele II died without an heir in 1962. Moruakgomo was considered a possible successor as his father had been the previous kgosi. His supporters made up a majority of the tribe, and they became known as the letsomane letona (transl. big flock). Among them were interim chief Kenalekgosi and the two living sons of Sechele II, MacIntyre and Mosarwa.

Moruakgomo's claim was challenged by his cousin Bonewamang, whose father Padi had previously been passed over in the line of succession. Moruakgomo's opponents disliked that his mother was a Coloured woman, and they alleged that Susan had never formally been wed to Sebele, which would make her a concubine who could not produce an heir. Kgari had previously made such allegations as kgosi, but they were unfounded. His detractors also feared that growing up away from the Bakwena would affect his ability to rule and that allowing the child of a polygamous marriage to rule would threaten Christian ideas of marriage. The British colonial administration, citing the 1943 Native Administration Proclamation, sent the dispute to the High Court. In February 1963, it ruled that Moruakgomo was next in line, but that both claimants would be passed over in favour of a compromise candidate, Neale Sechele.

Moruakgomo died in 1979. His brother Mokgalagadi initiated a legal challenge to have them recognised as the rightful successors in 1999. Mokgalagadi's son Kealeboga continued the challenge after Mokgalagadi's death the following year, but Kgari Sechele III became kgosi in 2002.
