= Moremi =

Moremi may refer to:

- Moremi, Botswana, a village in Botswana
- Moremi Game Reserve, a National Park in Botswana on the eastern side of the Okavango Delta
- Moremi High School, a government-run secondary school within the campus of Obafemi Awolowo University in Nigeria
- Moremi (name)
