= Leetile Disang Raditladi =

Motswana politician (1910–1971)

- Born: 1910; Serowe
- Died: 1971 (aged 60–61)
- Occupations: poet and playwright
- Known for: Raditladi Basin on Mercury, which was named after him

Leetile Disang Raditladi (1910–1971) was a Motswana playwright and poet.

== Biography ==
He was born in Serowe and got his education in Tiger Kloof, Lovedale and Fort Hare University. A prolific author, he had his first book, a biography of Khama III, accepted for publication while still in high school at Lovedale. This book was later quashed by the Bechuanaland Protectorate authorities and was not published.

He was banished from the Bangwato Reserve in 1937 after Tshekedi Khama, the Bangwato regent, accused Raditladi of adultery with his wife as well as for conspiring to bewitch him. After that Raditladi served as a colonial service clerk and quickly became the highest ranking Motswana in the Protectorate. Following his experiences with Tshekedi, Raditladi wrote his historical drama Motswasele II, his most famous work. The major theme of this work is with royal despotism and the perverted results of such tyranny.

In 1944 the Batawana Kgosi Moremi III asked the British to appoint Raditladi as the head of the Tsetse Fly Control agency in Ngamiland. As such he became the first Motswana to head a government department. Two years later, Moremi appointed him Tribal Secretary. This appointment occurred just before Moremi's death, following which the chief was succeeded by his wife, the regent EP Moremi. Raditladi and the Regent, both foreign-born, exercised tight control over Ngamiland and quickly aroused resentment. Their clandestine love affair also become public knowledge. In late 1950 the Regent was forced to abort Raditladi's child, an event that led Raditladi's opponents to drive him out of Ngamiland at gunpoint.

During the 1940s Raditladi was instrumental in establishing the sport of soccer in Botswana, and was behind the formation of leagues in both the northern and southern parts of the country.

In 1958 after his return to Serowe, Raditladi founded the Bechuanaland Protectorate Federal Party. Raditladi had for years been writing political newspaper columns under the pseudonym "Observer", but his journalistic abilities did not translate into successful politics. After his party was eclipsed by other nationalist movements he moved to the sidelines and played a minimal role in the run up to independence in 1966.

Raditladi wrote several historical plays, love stories and poems. In 2008 a large impact crater on Mercury was named Raditladi after him.

== Relevant literature ==
- Manyaapelo, Kebabaletswe Puleng Naom. "Raditladi's use of metaphor in selected poems." North-West University: PhD diss., 1998.
- Matjila, Daniel Sekepe. "Analogy and intertextuality in Setswana oral/written poetic diction." Muziki 6, no. 1 (2009): 92-111.
- Matjila, Daniel Sekepe. "Socio-cultural dimensions of Raditladi's poetry: Reflections from images and allusions from selected poems." South African Journal of African Languages 32, no. 1 (2012): 35-41.
- Matjila, Daniel Sekepe. "Sound and repetition as metaphor markers in Raditladi's work, Aferika." Muziki 5, no. 2 (2008): 250-262.
- Matjila, Daniel Sekepe. "The social, cultural and historical aspects of Raditladi's Sefalana sa menate." PhD diss., 2009.
- Matjila, Daniel Sekepe., and Karen Haire. "Representations of cattle wealth and comfort in Setswana life and oral literature." Muziki 5, no. 2 (2008): 196-212.
- Motlhamme, Moitheki Zephorah. "Tlhotlhomisi ya dintshontsho tsa lorato: LD Raditladi (Setswana)." PhD diss., University of Pretoria, 2007.
- Ntsonda, Manini Wilhelmina. "An analysis of selected poems from Sefalana sa menate by LD Raditladi with reference to Riffaterre's and Lotman's semiotics." PhD diss., North-West University, 2009.
- Pilane, Gabaitsiwe Elizabeth. "Naming: An aspect of character portrayal in Dintshontsho tsa lorato by LD Raditladi." Pilane, Gabaitsiwe Elizabeth. "Naming: An aspect of character portrayal in Dintshontsho tsa lorato by LD Raditladi." MA diss., 1996.
- Shole, Shole J. "Shakespeare in Setswana: An evaluation of Ratitladi's Macbeth and Plaatjie's Diphosophoso." Shakespeare in Southern Africa 4, no. 1 (1990): 51-64.
- Van Staden, Philippus Theunis. "Beeldspraak in Sefalana sa menate van LD Raditladi." PhD diss., 1985.
