= Kgari Sechele II =

Kwena chief (1892–1939)

- Born: 1904
- Died: 19 September 1962
- Title: Kgosi of the Bakwena
- Term: 1931–1962
- Predecessor: Sebele II
- Successor: Neale Sechele
- Father: Sechele II

Kgari Kealeboga Sechele II (1904–19 September 1962) was a kgosi of the Kwena tribe in the Bechuanaland Protectorate (modern day Botswana) from 1931 until his death in 1962. He was appointed to the position by the British colonial administration after it deposed his elder brother Sebele II.

Kgari was seen as illegitimate by the Bakwena, causing him to adopt a strict leadership style to maintain control. He depended heavily on the colonial administration to remain in power, which further affected his popular image. His popularity increased in the 1930s after the death of his predecessor gave him legitimacy, and he became a war hero after joining the African Auxiliary Pioneer Corps to fight in World War II. A succession crisis occurred after Kgari's death until the colonial administration appointed his younger brother Neale Sechele as kgosi.

== Early life and appointment ==
Kgari Kealeboga Sechele was born in 1904. He was the fifth son of Sechele II, kgosi of the Bakwena. Kgari was taken under the guardianship of his uncle Moitelasilo, who taught him about tribal politics at the kgotla. Assistant Resident Commissioner A. G. Stigand acquired a bursary for him in 1929, and Kgari went to South Africa to study at St. Mathews College. Kgari was seen fondly by the British colonial administration, and they considered him a better candidate than his brothers to be the next kgosi. Despite this, Kgari's older brother Sebele II succeeded their father as kgosi.

The colonial administration deposed Sebele II from his position as kgosi of the Bakwena in 1931, while Kgari was in South Africa. The administration considered Kgari's older brother Mosarwa to be too irresponsible to rule, and he had little interest in ruling anyway, so the administration chose Kgari to be the next kgosi. He was installed in June 1931. (Note: Reported as 5 June or 11 June) In an attempt to legitimise him, the administration crafted a public narrative that he was chosen by the populace.

The administration decided that Kgari should be a full kgosi instead of merely a regent or an acting ruler, even though he was not the next in line. A ceremony was held to name him kgosi on 1 September 1931. During the ceremony, his uncles draped a leopard skin upon his shoulders—an honour typically reserved only for the heir—which offended the village and increased backlash against his rule. The audience stood up during the ceremony, which the administration said was a positive gesture in support of his rule rather than an expression of dissent. Another incident took place when, despite a rule against mentioning Sebele II, the village elder Kgosimang demanded Sebele's return and received cheers from the crowd. Kgari's appointment saw protest not only from the Bakwena, but also from other Tswana dikgosi.

== Kgosi of the Bakwena ==
=== 1930s ===
Throughout the 1930s, the Bakwena held no allegiance to Kgari, and his orders were often disregarded. His refusal to address Sebele's exile solidified the opposition against him. As Kgari did not have popular support, he became a strict ruler to consolidate his power. He selected advisors from his group of supporters, but his advisors decreased in number over the following years until he ruled unilaterally. Teachers, religious figures, local leaders, and anyone else who opposed him lost their positions and were sometimes fined or jailed. On 6 March 1933, the people of Molepolole submitted the Great Petition to protest the administration's appointment of Kgari, which was signed by almost every family head, totalling over 1,400 signatures. (Note: Reported as 1,405 or 1,407 signatures) This was an unprecedented rebuttal, with petitions against Sebele II never going above 25 signatures.

Kgari was loyal to the colonial administration, as he was dependent on it to stay in power. Resident Commissioner Rey felt that Kgari's frequent requests for the administration to solve problems further weakened him in the eyes of the people. To increase Kgari's authority over the tribe, Charles Rey, the resident commissioner, used money from the Bakwena Tribal Fund to build a home for Kgari between the two Kwena factions around Molepolole: the faction in Ntsweng and the faction in Borakalalo. He hoped it would cause them to merge around Kgari, but it only left Kgari isolated from both factions. When Kgari moved the Bakwena capital away from Ntsweng in the late 1930s, (Note: Reported as 1936 or 1937) he required the assistance of the colonial police to move the Kwena people by force.

Kgari faced accusations of sexual misconduct in the early years of his reign, including the attempted rape of Angelina Mmopi in 1936 and the seduction of Eurice Kraai in 1940. As kgosi, he implemented a policy in the 1930s of awarding eight cattle to unmarried pregnant women. He was one of several Tswana chiefs who wished to reverse the trend of migrant work from the Bechuanaland Protectorate to South Africa, fearing that the exodus of workers would leave the protectorate unable to sustain itself. When Sebele II offered to formally abdicate in exchange for an end to his exile in 1938, Kgari refused, fearing what Sebele's presence would do to his authority. Kgari became more popular at the end of the 1930s, especially after the death of Sebele II in 1939, which ended the most serious challenge to Kgari's legitimacy.

=== World War II and later years ===
Kgari joined the African Auxiliary Pioneer Corps in 1941 to fight in World War II, fulfilling a tradition of the kgosi going to war to prove his strength. This improved his image among the people, and his public indication of support for the war effort improved his standing with the colonial administration. He was made a regimental sergeant major after writing a letter to the resident commissioner requesting the rank in exchange for his work recruiting soldiers from his tribe. Stories circulated about his performance in combat, and he became a war hero among the Tswana peoples. One such story tells that an enemy squad bombarded a tent he was sleeping in, only for him to walk away unscathed. Wishing to demonstrate his importance, Kgari attempted to have his headmen demand his return, but this did not occur, and he served in the war until 1945.

Though opposition to his rule was reduced by the end of the war, Kgari maintained his strict rule over the tribe. He attended the coronation of Elizabeth II in 1953, where he represented the Bechuanaland Protectorate, and he engaged in a rare dispute with the colonial administration the same year when he sheltered refugees from South Africa. By the end of his reign, Kgari had overseen the construction of several major buildings, including a church hospital in 1931, the Bakwena National School in 1938, a council chamber in 1945, and a secondary school in 1959. He also saw to the renovation of the London Missionary Society church in 1957. Conversely, he had the village in Ntsweng destroyed, leaving only the Bakwena National Office building standing.

== Death and succession ==
Kgari indicated in 1949 that he may retire, suggesting that he be succeeded by his nephew Bonewamang Padi Sechele, but the tribe insisted that he should not. He floated retirement and succession to Bonewamang a second time in 1954 when he was having marital problems. Kgari considered retirement more seriously in 1962 as formal political parties began to develop within the Bechuanaland Protectorate. He travelled to Swaziland, where he was said to be purchasing a farm. It was here that Kgari died suddenly on 19 September 1962.

Throughout Kgari's life, he speculated that he would be the last kgosi of the Bakwena. As he had no children, his death triggered a succession crisis. Claims were made by two members of the family: Moruakgomo, who was Sebele II's son, and Bonewamang, who was the son of Padi—Sebele II and Kgari's older brother Padi. Kenalekgosi served as acting kgosi while the dispute was resolved. The court determined that Kgari's younger brother, Neale Sechele, would become kgosi despite not being in the immediate line of succession, and he was installed in 1963.

== Works cited ==
- Griffiths, Anne M. O. (1997). In the Shadow of Marriage: Gender and Justice in an African Community. University of Chicago Press. ISBN 978-0-226-30873-9.
- Jackson, Ashley (1999). Botswana, 1939-1945: An African Country at War. Clarendon Press. ISBN 978-0-19-820764-1.
- Mbuya, Titus (1999). "Legitimacy and Succession in Tswana States: The Case of BaKwena, 1930-1963". Pula: Botswana Journal of African Studies. 13 (1): 61–76. Archived from the original on 23 April 2025.
- Morton, Barry; Ramsay, Jeff (2018). Historical Dictionary of Botswana (5th ed.). Rowman & Littlefield. ISBN 978-1-5381-1133-8.
- Ramsay, Jeff (1996). "The Fall and Decline of the Bakwena Monarchy". Botswana Notes and Records. 28: 65–86. JSTOR 40980134.
- Williamson, David (1977). Burke's Royal Families of the World. Vol. II: Africa & the Middle East. Burke's Peerage. ISBN 978-0-85011-029-6.
