= Elizabeth Pulane Moremi =

Regent and queen of baTawana from 1946 to 1964

Regent and mohumagadi of Tawana
- Reign: 1947–1964
- Predecessor: Moremi III
- Successor: Letsholathêbê II a Morêmi
- Born: August 1912; Orange Free State
- Died: 1994 (aged 81–82)
- Spouse: Moremi III
- Issue: 3

Elizabeth Pulane Moremi OBE (1912–1994) was regent and mohumagadi (queen) of baTawana from 1946 to 1964 while her son, Letsholathêbê II a Morêmi, was too young to rule. She married Moremi III, the ruler of baTawana, in 1937. When he was killed in a 1946 car crash, she was made regent. In this role, Moremi attempted to make several progressive reforms but was hindered by conservative opposition. She stepped down in 1964 and worked at a school until her death, thirty years later.

== Early life ==
Elizabeth Pulane Moremi was born in the Orange Free State in August 1912 to Reuben Seeco, a railway worker, and Elizabeth Molema. Her parents were members of the BaRolong tribe. She spoke English and Afrikaans as a child. After training to work as a nurse, she moved to South Africa and found employment at the Tiger Kloof Educational Institute. It was at the school that she met her husband, Moremi, and the two married in 1937. They had three children. It was said that she "preferred to be called Mrs. Moremi".

== Career ==
In 1937 her husband became king of the BaTawana and the couple moved to Ngamiland. Moremi III did not always get along with the British who controlled Botswana at the time as part of the Bechuanaland Protectorate, and he was suspended in 1945 over allegations of corruption. Because the British felt she could be trusted, Elizabeth Moremi was placed as treasurer of the tribe. Her husband died the following year in a car crash. Because the most prominent adult male in the family, her husband's uncle, was considered incompetent by British authorities and their eldest son was too young to rule, Moremi became regent of the tribe. The British officials had a positive impression of her work as treasurer. There were around 50,000 people in the tribe when she assumed the position. Leetile Disang Raditladi, who had been appointed by her husband, was her secretary. The two had an affair that began in 1947.

The Dictionary of African Biography describes Moremi as a "a progressive and able administrator", but her regency was marked by conflict with conservative royals who had long controlled the tribe and its policies. Of the royal family, only her husband's mother supported Moremi as regent. Some considered her a poor choice because she was not a native member of the tribe. Moremi also considered herself more refined than the BaTawana; she had not even been close to her husband after several years because he considered her too "aloof", and he sometimes had one of his mistresses cook food for her. These conservatives tried to remove Moremi, but the British supported her remaining in control. The Birth of Botswana describes her as trapped between conservative tribe members who opposed reform, particularly giving more power to people who were not members of the BaTawana tribe, and the British, who favored such steps.

Moremi instituted some reforms, such as giving the BaYei people an increased degree of independence in 1948. After British encouragement and despite her own reservations, she granted them a dikgotla but denied the existence of botlhanka. She created a tribal council to increase the representation of "subordinate groups" in the 1950s. Moremi was appointed a Member of the Order of the British Empire in the 1957 New Year Honours, and an Officer of the Order of the British Empire in the 1963 New Year Honours.

By 1950, the historian Susan Williams writes, Moremi had become "well known as a progressive and just administrator." A 1961 newspaper profile said that she held "power no woman has achieved in Africa since European invaders deposed the last of the women chiefs". As chief she increased discipline as well as spending on education. Moremi would also criticize the British government at times, including over its treatment of Seretse Khama and handling of a disagreement with the BaNgwato. When the Protectorate Legislative Council was created in 1960, she was the only woman to serve on it. In 1963 she banned the hunting of hippos in the region.

The Moremi Game Reserve was created in 1963. Moremi had played a crucial role in its creation, shepherding the effort and working to build support for it. She eventually convinced the community to support the reserve at kgotla (or community decision). The effort pioneered community-based natural resource management. The reserve's creation has been cited as a major step in wildlife conservation in the region.

== Retirement and death ==
Moremi left the regency in 1964 and was succeeded by her son. Moremi later worked in eastern Botswana, at the Francistown Teaching College. She eventually retired and died in 1994.

== Bibliography ==
- Williams, Susan (2006). Colour Bar: The Triumph of Seretse Khama and His Nation. Allen Lane. ISBN 978-0-713-99811-5.
- Morton, Fred; Ramsay, Jeff, eds. (1987). The Birth of Botswana: A History of the Bechuanaland Protectorate from 1910 to 1966. Longman Botswana.
