= Batawana people =

Ethnic group in Botswana

The Batawana people are a southern Africa ethnic group. They are named for the leader at the time of which they seceded from their parent tribe, the Bakwena, who originate from the Bahurutshe tribe. The Moremi Game Reserve was created by the Batawana people - and named after their leader Moremi III, to whom the territory belonged - in order to protect the game animals "for posterity". The land on which the reserve sits was considered to be the "cream of their game country" in the Okavango Delta.

In 1946, the tribe had a population of 8,124 people.

== History ==
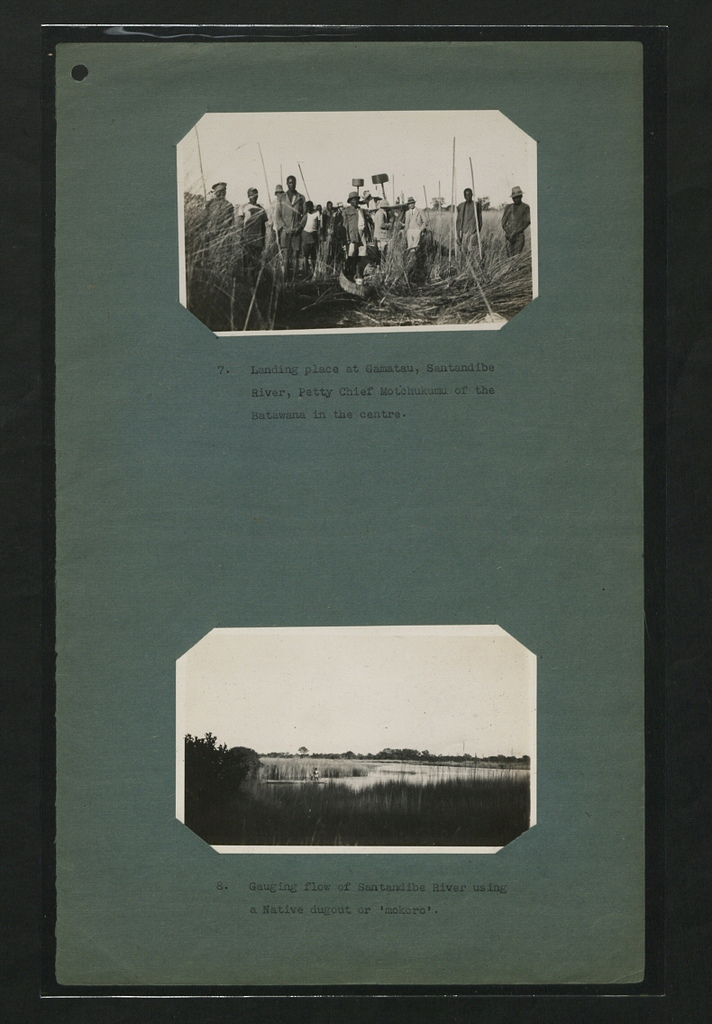
Landing place at Gamatau, Santandibe River, Petty Chief Motochukumu of the Batawana in the centre.

The chief of the Bakwena tribe, Mathiba, had had two sons; Kgama and Tawana. Mathiba favoured his younger son, Tawana, leading to a rivalry between the two sons, as Kgama feared Tawana would attempt to deprive him of his chieftainship. This resulted in Tawana, who had a large following, leaving the main tribe with his followers. Taking with them their cattle and possessions, Tawana's tribe followed the Botletle River toward the Kgwebe Hills.

Kgama tailed them for a period of time before giving up. On arrival at the Kgwebe Hills in about 1790, which was then occupied by the Bakgalagadi, the Batawana drove out the residents, taking possession of their wells and establishing a village there.

Tawana was later killed at about 40 years of age by Moremi I, one of his seven sons, who then became the chief of the tribe. In about 1825, under Moremi I's rule, the Basuto (Makololo) under rule of Sebitwane arrived and drove the Batawana out, taking most of their cattle. The Batawana fled toward Chobe, settling at Tsoroga, living in a settlement until Sebitwane returned from Damaraland to follow them. They were attacked and taken as captives. The chief of the Batawana at that time, and some tribesmen was murdered by Sebitwane, but a small number of the Batawana people - under Mogalakwe's rule - left the village, under the guise they were collecting locusts. They escaped successfully, and made their way back to Lake Ngami, where they settled for some time, becoming large cattle owners. They were considered locally rich and militaristic people, having firearms.

== Culture ==
Batawana hawkers who obtained goods, such as firearms, from European traders were known as Dimausu in the local dialect of Bantu.

A cloth known as a tukwi is a type of headgear worn by Batawana women.

== Etymology ==
Batawana translates to the "people of Tawana", the leader who led them from Shoshong to the Kgwebe Hills near Lake Ngami, around the year 1800.

== See also ==
- List of rulers of Tawana
