= Neale Sechele =

Kwena chief (1915–1985)

- Born: 1915
- Died: 1985 (aged 69–70)
- Title: Kgosi of the Bakwena
- Term: 1963–1970
- Predecessor: Kgari Sechele II
- Successor: Bonewamang Padi Sechele
- Parents: Baruti Kgosidintsi (father); Phetogo (mother)

Neale Molaodi Sechele (1915–1985) was kgosi of the Bakwena. He was appointed to the position by the court in 1963 following the death of his brother Kgari Sechele II, and he was forced to abdicate in 1970. As Neale was appointed against the wishes of the people and he often neglected his responsibilities, he was regarded poorly by the Bakwena.

== Early life ==
Neale Molaodi Sechele was born in 1915. He was the son of Baruti Kgosidintsi and Phetogo, the ex-wife of kgosi Sechele II. Neale attended the Tati Training Institution and the Tiger Kloof Educational Institute. Neale was the younger brother of Sebele II, kgosi of the Bakwena. When Sebele was deposed by the British colonial administration in 1931, Neale's other brother Kgari Sechele II became kgosi.

== Kgosi of the Bakwena ==
Neale became kgosi of the Bakwena in 1963. Kgari's death had triggered a succession crisis in 1962, and the court held an inquiry in February 1963. Neale had been chosen as a compromise between the faction that supported Bonewamang Padi Sechele and the one that supported Moruakgomo. The court did not know that Neale was not a blood relative of his brothers' father. The decision to appoint Neale was directly influenced by the colonial administration.

Neale was not well received by the Bakwena. He was not next in the line of succession, and at the time of his appointment he was unemployed and often engaged in heavy drinking. The royal family doubted his ability to rule, and he was widely seen as merely a government appointee. Neale frequently ignored the responsibilities of the bokgosi, declining to attend the kgotla and refusing to marry or have children. Neale is regarded as having been a poor kgosi. Jeff Ramsay described Neale as reigning "ineffectively". Neale's deputy chief from 1964 to 1969, Mack Sechele, was often the one leading the tribe in practice.

One effect of weak leadership over the Bakwena was that the tribe was not in a position to contest the development of a national government under Seretse Khama of the Bangwato. After the nation achieved independence, Neale neglected his responsibilities as a member of the District Council. Neale was an opponent of the Tribal Land Act, and he campaigned against it throughout the district. He had a poor understanding of the law, and a district councilor accompanied him to correct the false statements he made.

== Abdication and death ==
The government of Botswana disapproved of Neale's performance as kgosi, and pressure for Neale to abdicate mounted in 1970. On 21 September 1970, a kgotla was called so a list of charges could be read against Neale. He chose to resign so as to avoid the impeachment process and to retain the right to his pension. Rather than appointing a new kgosi, the government replaced Neale with Bonewamang Padi Sechele as the district's "Acting Tribal Authority" in October 1970. Neale died in 1985.
