= Moremi (name) =

Moremi is both a given name and a surname.

== Given name ==
- Moremi III (1915–1946), chief of the BaTawana
- Moremi Ajasoro, a quasi-historical queen of the Yoruba people of Nigeria

== Surname ==
- Elizabeth Pulane Moremi (1912–1994), regent and queen of baTawana
- Tshepang Moremi (born 2000), South African soccer player
