= Mack Sechele =

Kwena chief

- Title: Tribal Authority of the Bakwena
- Term: 1978–1986
- Predecessor: Bonewamang Padi Sechele
- Successor: Moithali Sechele II (regent)
- Children: Sentibile; Moithali
- Parents: Sechele II (father); Lena (mother)

MacIntyre "Mack" Sechele was the regent of the Kwena tribe from 1978 to 1986. He was born to kgosi Sechele II of the Bakwena and his first wife Lena Rauwe. When a succession dispute occurred between Bonewamang Padi Sechele and Moruakgomo Sechele in 1962, Mack supported Moruakgomo to be kgosi. Though he was the son of a kgosi, Mack did not challenge the seniority of his nephews when they were considered potential heirs.

Neale Sechele was chosen as kgosi in 1963, and Mack became his deputy chief the following year. As Neale had little interest in governing, Mack effectively managed the tribe until the end of his tenure in 1969. Neale's successor Bonewamang died 1978, and Mack was appointed as the district's African Tribal Authority to serve as a regent for Bonewamang's son Kgari Sechele III. Mack resigned in 1986 and was succeeded by his son Moithali Sechele II. His elder son Sentibile did not succeed him due to questions about his legitimacy.
