= Bonewamang Padi Sechele =

Kwena chief (1926–1978)

- Born: 1926
- Died: 1978 (aged 51–52)
- Title: Tribal Authority of the Bakwena
- Term: 1970–1978
- Predecessor: Neale Sechele (kgosi)
- Successor: Mack Sechele (regent)
- Children: Kgari Sechele III
- Father: Padi

Bonewamang Padi Sechele (1926–1978) was the African Tribal Authority of the Kwena tribe from 1970 until his death in 1978. He was appointed by the government in lieu of a kgosi after the abdication of Neale Sechele.

== Background ==
Bonewamang Padi Sechele was born in 1926 to Padi, who died in 1929. Bonewamang was the grandson of kgosi Sechele II of the Kwena tribe. Bonewamang attended the Tiger Kloof Educational Institute, but he did not do well academically. He was underage after his uncle kgosi Sebele II was deposed without an heir in 1931, so he was not considered as a possible successor and Kgari Sechele II became kgosi. When Kgari floated the idea of retirement, he named Bonewamang as his preferred successor. Bonewamang served 15.5 months in prison after he was convicted of theft by conversion in 1957, and he was charged with the crime again in 1962.

== Regency ==
Bonewamang was a headman in Letlhakeng. Upon the death of Kgari, Bonewamang was considered one of two possible successors, alongside Sebele's son Moruakgomo. Bonewamang's supporters argued that Moruakgamo was ineligible because his parents had not completed certain marriage rites, and many opposed Moruakgomo because his mother was Coloured. Bonewamang's opponents argued that an heir could not be chosen from someone senior of the previous kgosi, although this had occurred before. The issue went to the court, and it was decided that Neale Sechele would be appointed kgosi as a compromise.

Bonewamang was appointed as the district's African Tribal Authority after Neale was pressured into abdicating in 1970. The following February, Bonewamang was accused of stock theft and the district commissioner negotiated to prevent his prosecution. Bonewamang died in a car accident in 1978. His underage son Kgari Sechele III succeeded him as kgosi, and Mack Sechele became regent as the African Tribal Authority.
