= Kgari Sechele III =

Kwena chief

- Title: Kgosi of the Bakwena
- Term: 2002–present
- Predecessor: Kgosikwena Sebele (regent)
- Father: Bonewamang Padi Sechele

Kgari Sechele III is the kgosi of the Kwena tribe. He was born to Bonewamang Padi Sechele, kgosi of the Bakwena, in 1973 or 1974. Bonewamang died in a car accident in 1978 while Kgari was four years old. Mack Sechele, Moithali Sechele II, and Kgosikwena Sebele all served as regents for Kgari. Mokgaladi Sechele initiated legal proceedings in 1999 to have himself recognized as the heir, and after his death the following year the challenge was continued by his son Kealeboga Sechele. Kgari was formally sworn in as kgosi in March 2002. He legally married his wife in August 2008, and their wedding was held on 11 July 2009.
