= Motswasele I =

Kwena chief (died c. 1785)

- Died: c. 1785; Shokwane
- Title: Kgosi of the Bakwena
- Term: c. 1770 – c. 1785
- Predecessor: Motshodi
- Successor: Seitlhamo
- Children: Seitlhamo; Monametse
- Father: Legojane

Motswasele I (died c. 1785) was kgosi of the Kwena tribe from c. 1770 until his death c. 1790. He was preceded by his grandfather Motshodi and succeeded by his son Seitlhamo.

== Life ==
Motswasele was born in the early 18th century, between 1715 and 1745. He the son of Legojane and the grandson of Motshodi, kgosi of the Bakwena. Bakwena oral tradition tells that Motswasele was a prolific traveler when he was young and was the first of the Bakwena to see Europeans. Legojane died before Motshodi, making Motswasele the next in line to be kgosi. Motswasele took on responsibilities to manage the tribe as Motshodi grew older, and he became kgosi upon Motshodi's death c. 1770. He led the tribe to Shokwane and then to Dithejane. Here the Bakwena defeated the Bangwaketse in battle at Gookodisa.

One story tells that Mathiba was the younger brother of Motswasele, and that Motswasele sentenced Mathiba to death for castrating bulls without permission. It is said that when they encountered Lesele, they agreed that he could take Mathiba away. Mathiba's followers went with him, separating the Bangwato from the Bakwena. This story is contradicted by other accounts that Mathiba was the heir to the Bangwato who lived with the Bakwena until he came of age.

== Death and succession ==
Motswasele died c. 1785. By this time, the Bakwena had returned to Shokwane. He was succeeded by his son Seitlhamo. Motswasele had another son, Monametse, who did not become kgosi.
