= Seitlhamo =

Kwena chief (died c. 1795)

- Died: c. 1795; Dithejane
- Title: Kgosi of the Bakwena
- Term: c. 1785–1795
- Predecessor: Motswasele I
- Successor: Legwale
- Children: Legwale; Maleke; Tshosa; Mooketse
- Father: Motswasele I

Seitlhamo (died c. 1795) was a kgosi of the Kwena tribe. He ruled from the death of his father Motswasele I c. 1785 until his own death c. 1795. He was succeeded by his son Legwale.

== Life ==
Seitlhamo was the son of Motswasele I, kgosi of the Kwena people. He was loyal to his father, carrying out his wishes and refusing to take power when his father was infirm later in life. Throughout his life, Seitlhamo fought in several battles against the Ngwaketse people, with whom the Bakwena were in constant conflict in Seitlhamo's time.

Seitlhamo became kgosi c. 1785. By this time, he had already reached old age. As kgosi, he moved the Kwena tribe from Shokwane to Dithejane, which had temporarily been the home of the Kwena under his father's reign. Kgabo Tebele described Seitlhamo as a patient ruler, in contrast with his predecessor.

== Death and legacy ==
Seitlhamo was killed in an attack by the Bangwaketse c. 1795. Reportedly, the attack took place after Seitlhamo's junior son Mooketse covertly met with the Ngwaketse chief and told him when Dithejane would be undefended. Seitlhamo was succeeded by his son Legwale. Legwale's succession was challenged by another of Seitlhamo's sons, Tshosa. Legwale's mother was Seitlhamo's first wife, making Legwale next in line, but Tshosa's mother, another of Seitlhamo's wives, gave birth first. Legwale's successor, Sietlhamo's son Maleke, led an attack against the Bangwaketse to avenge Seitlhamo's death.
