= Motshodi =

Kwena chief

- Died: Phuthadikobo (later Motshodi)
- Title: Kgosi of the Bakwena
- Predecessor: Kgabo II
- Successor: Motswasele I
- Children: Legojane
- Father: Kgabo II

Motshodi or Mochudi was kgosi of the Kwena tribe. He was preceded by his father Kgabo II and succeeded by his grandson Motswasele I.

Motshodi was the son of Kgabo II, kgosi of the Bakwena. Motshodi succeeded his father as kgosi, with historian Isaac Schapera saying this happened c. 1740. According to Schapera, Motshodi led the Bakwena to Odi (now the Kgatleng District), Mosweu, and Phuthadikobo. The Bangwaketse and Bangwato may have split from the Bakwena during Motshodi's reign. Schapera suggests that the Bangwaketse split while they were in Mosweu and the Bangwato split toward the end of Motshodi's reign. It is disputed as to whether Kgabo II or Motshodi led the Bakwena into present-day Botswana.

Motshodi's son and heir, Legojane, died within Motshodi's lifetime. Motshodi reportedly lived well into old age, and Legojane's son Motswasele assisted Motshodi in his later years. According to Schapera, Motshodi died at Phuthadikobo c. 1770 and was buried under a mopipi tree, and the location was renamed from Puthadikobo to Motshodi in his honour. Motshodi was succeeded as kgosi by Motswasele.

According to history professor Leonard Ngcongco, Kgabo and Motshodi lived in the seventeenth century rather than the eighteenth. Because Motshodi was succeeded by his grandson, some Motswana genealogies have confused Motshodi as the elder brother of Legojane rather than his father. Motshodi has also been written as Mochudi. According to Schapera, Motshodi was regarded by future generations as "a good chief".
