= Kgabo II =

Kwena chief

- Title: Kgosi of the Bakwena
- Predecessor: Mogopa
- Successor: Motshodi
- Children: Motshodi
- Father: Tebele

Kgabo II was kgosi of the Kwena tribe. He was born a junior son of the Bakwena kgosi Tebele. Tebele was succeeded by Kgabo's older brother Mogopa, and Kgabo was given control of a ward within the tribe. Following a drought, Mogopa wished to move the tribe to find rain, but Kgabo and his village did not accompany them. The Bakwena split into two separate groups: the Bakwena-Kgabo staying in Rathatheng, and the Bakwena-Mogopa that settled in Mabjanamatshwana.

Kgabo may have been the kgosi who lead the Bakwena from Rathatheng into present-day Botswana, but this could also have been his son and successor Motshodi. According to Isaac Schapera, Kgabo was succeeded by Motshodi c. 1740. According to history professor Leonard Ngcongco, Kgabo and Motshodi lived in the seventeenth century.
