= Legwale =

Kwena chief

- Died: c. 1798 – c. 1803; Bonyoni or Shoshong
- Title: Kgosi of the Bakwena
- Term: c. 1785–1795
- Predecessor: Seitlhamo
- Successor: Maleke (regent)
- Children: Motswasele II; Segokotlo; Molese; Kgama
- Father: Seitlhamo

Legwale was a kgosi of the Kwena tribe in the late 18th century. He was preceded by his father Seitlhamo and succeeded by his brother Maleke as regent. Gary Okihiro has contested the idea that Legwale is a single individual, saying that there were two consecutive dikgosi named Legwale who were father and son.

== Life ==
Legwale was the son of the Kwena kgosi Seitlhamo. As a young man, it's believed that Legwale led the Kwena people in a war with the Kgafela people in a failed attempt to reinstate Makgotso as the Kgafela tribe's regent. Legwale was briefly captured during this conflict.

Upon Seitlhamo's death, Legwale became the kgosi. As kgosi, Legwale led a raiding party to steal cattle. This has been reported as a raid against the Birwa people in Shoshong, or against the Shona people in Bonyani. Legwale was killed during the raid. His year of death has been reported as c. 1798 and c. 1803. Because the targets were prepared, and because Legwale was the only member of the party to be killed, rumours developed that Legwale' brothers warned the targets in advance.

== Legacy ==
Legwale's sons included Motswasele II and Segokotlo in the great house, Molese in the second house, and his junior son Kgama. As they were still young upon Legwale's death, his brother Maleke became regent. Upon Maleke's death, his brother Tshosa became regent before Motswasele II became kgosi. According to Gary Okihiro, the identification of Legwale as a single figure is an error and there were two consecutive dikgosi named Legwale, Legwale I and his son Legwale II.
