= Bogwera and bojale =

Tswana rite of passage

Bogwera and bojale are the rites of passage for children of the Tswana people that mark their coming of age. Boys practice bogwera and girls practice bojale, and they were historically the most important rites of passage of the Tswana people. Taking place over several months, bogwera and bojale were required before one's adulthood was recognised.

Bogwera and bojale involve both educational and religious components. Boys and girls are sent to schools specifically dedicated to bogwera and bojale where they are taught about Tswana history, religion, and cosmology, as well as how to act as adults, to behave toward elders and royalty, and to be obedient. They are also taught about their rights in society and about topics relating to sexual intercourse. Instruction takes place through games, puzzles, proverbs, dance, songs, and poems. Bojale may incorporate the use of an open drum that is meant to symbolise a womb and birth canal.

Bogwera began with circumcision, but no female genital cutting took place during bojale. Occasional fatalities occurred at this stage. Bogwera included a physical element that bojale did not. Boys were brought out to the wild in the cold to learn herding, hunting, and warfare. Each boy participating in bogwera in the 19th century was also required to write a praise poem about himself, which he would expand throughout his life.

Everyone participating in bogwera or bojale was grouped into an age set called a mophato, and they remained a member of their group for life. Each mophato functioned as a regiment that could be enlisted by the kgosi to participate in construction projects or other public services as well as for military or law enforcement purposes.

European missionaries opposed bogwera and bojale when they arrived in present-day Botswana and worked to ban them, replacing the initiation schools with mission schools. The Anglican Church broke from the London Missionary Society in 1917 when it permitted its adherents in the Bechuanaland Protectorate to resume bogwera, but this only lasted a few years. The Balete people were the only tribe who still practiced bogwera and bojale at the end of the colonial era.
