= African Auxiliary Pioneer Corps =

British Colonial Auxiliary Forces formation

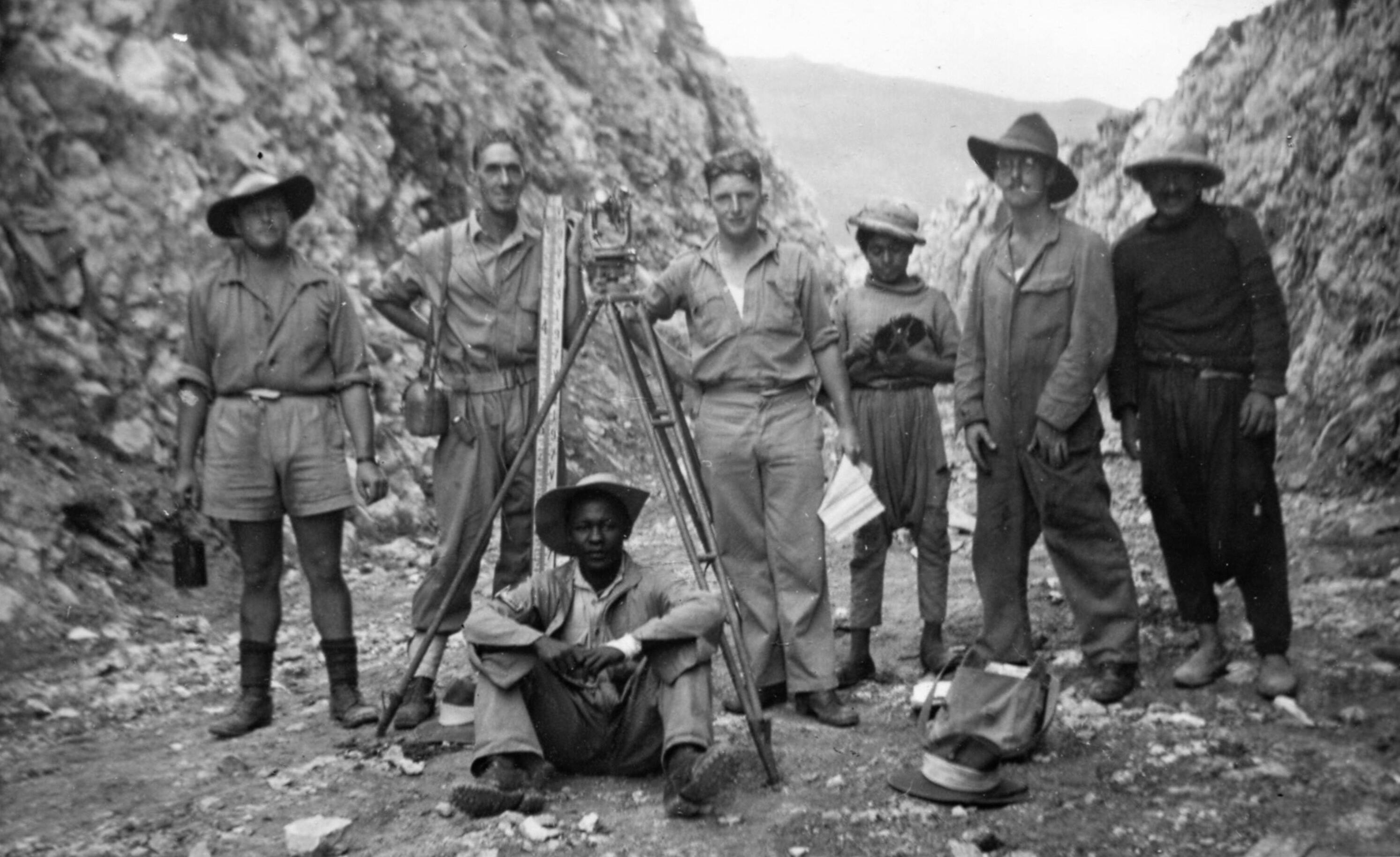
- A mixed group of Lebanese labourers, Australian soldiers and AAPC servicemen in Lebanon, 1942
- Active: 1941–1946
- Disbanded: 1949
- Country: Kenya, Uganda, Tanganyika, Swaziland, Basutoland and Bechuanaland
- Allegiance: British Empire
- Branch: British Colonial Auxiliary Forces
- Role: Military engineering and combat support
- Size: 36,000
- Engagements: World War II; North African campaign; Italian campaign (World War II); Allied invasion of Sicily; Battle of Anzio; Operation Avalanche; Battle of Monte Cassino; Spring 1945 offensive in Italy; Dodecanese campaign; Jewish insurgency in Mandatory Palestine

The African Auxiliary Pioneer Corps (AAPC) was a formation of the British Colonial Auxiliary Forces recruited among Africans in Kenya, Uganda, Tanganyika and the High Commission Territories (HCT) during World War II. It was renamed the African Pioneer Corps (APC) in 1943 in recognition of its service, which included providing logistical and combat support to Allied forces during the North African, Dodecanese and Italian campaigns. Commanded by Colonel H. G. L. Prynne, it ultimately numbered 36,000 servicemen, 1,216 of whom died during the war.

== Background ==
Following the entry of the British Empire into World War II against the Axis powers in 1939, the question of the role that was to be played by its African subjects resurfaced. In July 1940, Britain's largest ally France was knocked out of the war in the Battle of France, creating a risk that the British would fall short of sufficient troops for military operations in Europe and North Africa. Recruitment began in British colonies and the issue of raising armed African units was brought to the House of Commons of the United Kingdom for the first time. The white-minority government of South Africa vehemently opposed arming Black troops, especially for fighting against white soldiers, insisting that racial segregation be maintained. The decision made by the South African government was extended to the High Commission Territories (HTC) of Swaziland, Basutoland and Bechuanaland. Black Africans were instead recruited into labour units so as to enable more whites in Southern Africa to enlist into the Union Defence Force (UDF).

On 1 June 1940, amidst much criticism from his political opponents, South Africa's prime minister Jan Smuts authorized the recruitment of non-white troops through the newly formed Directorate of Non-European Army Services (NEAS) into the Cape Corps and the Native Labour Corps. Smuts gradually relented to British pressure, allowing both white and non-white South African troops to serve outside their homeland, first in East Africa and later in the Mediterranean and Middle East theatre of World War II. South Africa paved the way for the recruitment of manpower in the HCT; the first unit to benefit from the recruitment drives was the South African Native Police Force (SANPF). Recruitment for the SANPF was halted when the Native Military Guards (NMG) unit was created by the NEAS and four battalions were to be raised. Low pay and allowances prevented the NMG from achieving its goals, and as such the Native Military Corps (NMC) was created in its place. Volunteers from the HTC were permitted to enlist in the NMC.

In July, South African authorities requested that 145 men be recruited from each of the territories and HTC residents working in South Africa also volunteered. Recruitment was done in cities with the assistance of local chiefs. Minor chiefs, policemen and government employees under the age of 25 were selected on the basis of their potential to become non-commissioned officers. Recruits departed for the NMC Welgedacht training depot in South Africa in September. The first recruitment drive elicited mixed reactions in the High Commission Territories. Concerns were raised about the incorporation of HTC soldiers into the UDF due to its racist policies and the low level of training given to African recruits, as had happened during the course of World War I. Despite the fact that training was hampered by language barriers, resident commissioner Charles Arden-Clarke rebuffed any attempt to create separate tribal units. Spearheaded by Kgari Sechele II of Bechuanaland and supported by Seeiso of Basutoland and Sobhuza II, the chiefs eventually managed to separate their subjects from the UDF.

== Service ==
Between April and May 1941, a large number of Cypriot and Palestinian labor companies were annihilated in the Battle of Greece, exhausting Britain's labor pool in the Middle East. For unknown reasons, Sudanese labor units could only be employed in the vicinity of their homeland. The situation continued to deteriorate as the German Afrika Korps swept through North Africa. Britain responded by extending the scope of the Royal Pioneer Corps to include its possessions in west, east and South Africa. In May, military officials began negotiations on the recruitment of pioneers in the HTCs. The mobilization order was communicated through traditional meetings and recruitment for the African Auxiliary Pioneer Corps (AAPC) was launched in late July. The initial goal was for Basutoland, Bechuanaland and Swaziland to provide 10,000, 3,000 and 500 men respectively. Terms and conditions of the contracts were to mirror those of the Native Military Corps and resembled those set for mine workers performing heavy manual labor. Pay was lower than in the UDF, as the soldiers received no allowances. A private without dependants received between 2 shillings and 3 pence and a shilling and 6 pence per day, along with food, clothing, accommodation and health services.

Basic training lasted for four weeks and included limited arms training. Upon its completion the soldiers boarded trains to Durban, from which they traveled to the fighting fronts by sea, with stops in Mombasa and Aden. By the time of their October 1941 arrival at the Pioneer Corps depot in Qusassin, the AAPC numbered 18,800 men and was led by Colonel H. G. L. Prynne. Workload was gradually increased over the course of ten days, while equipment was being handed. Only a few men received rifles, most being armed with assegais and knobkieries. Training included driving lessons, vehicle maintenance, shooting practice, cobbling, tailoring and cooking. In December, most of AAPC companies were attached to Ninth Army units in the Nile Delta, Palestine and Syria. The AAPC performed a wide range of manual labor, repairing and demolishing roads, bridges and fortifications (Ras Baalbek and Jdeide). Building railroads from Beirut to Haifa. Tunneling, loading ammunition onto trains, guarding supplies and working as cooks. By 1942, shortages in manpower had led to the employment of AAPC troops in coastal artillery, anti-aircraft artillery, fire services, salvaging operations and garrison duty on the Suez Canal.

On 15 April 1942, a second round of recruitment was launched in the HTCs and the goal was set at 15,000 men. Unlike 1941, army recruiters struggled to attract volunteers and resorted to coercion. In July, the Transvaal Gold Producers Committee agreed to bar jobseekers from the HTCs from applying, to curb the flow of people using the mines to evade conscription. Chiefs who collaborated with the British set up bogus tribal assemblies and men who attended were conscripted. A similar procedure was set at mines, whereby men seeking employment were taken through the back door to army trucks which immediately took them to military installations. When those methods failed to produce results, army recruiters relaxed their medical requirements and began raiding the countryside and abducting able bodied men they came across. A number of recruits were also threatened with land and livestock confiscation. The anti-colonial Basutoland Lekhotla la Bafo (Commoner's League) was banned and its leaders were imprisoned for demanding that training for the recruits be improved. Draft dodgers migrated to other colonies such as Nyasaland, faked illnesses, inflicted injuries upon themselves and hid in forests and grain silos.

On 1 May 1943, the British troopship SS Erinpura was torpedoed and sunk, resulting in the loss of 694 men from AAPC's 1919th and 1927th Companies; the unit's worst loss of life during the war. On 12 May, the Allies suppressed the last Axis centers of resistance in North Africa and soon afterwards, the AAPC was renamed the African Pioneer Corps (APC) in recognition of its service. Once the decision for the Allied invasion of Sicily was made, the APC moved to forward operating bases in Tripoli and Malta. The APC took part in the Sicily landings, providing anti-aircraft cover for Syracuse and smoke screens for the beach landings. On 11 August, five APC servicemen were killed and 26 wounded in a bombing raid on their camp at Lentini. On 9 September, the Eighth Army crossed into mainland Italy and APC troops operated as smoke companies in the battles of Anzio, Salerno and Monte Cassino. APC companies also took part in the Dodecanese campaign. The APC unloaded supplies at the ports of Bari, Brindisi and Taranto, occasionally relieving British field artillery units of their duty.

== Disbandment ==
Towards the end of 1944, Axis air activity over Italy had decreased significantly, leading to the return of APC personnel to their traditional duties. In April 1945, the Eighth Army spearheaded the Spring 1945 offensive in Italy. The APC supported their effort, reaching Trieste and the Austrian border. Germany signed an unconditional surrender on 2 May, ending the fighting on the Italian front but demobilization of the approximately 36,000 APC soldiers was postponed time after time due to shipping shortages. After the end of the war the APC was initially transferred to Palestine, morale suffered and members of the APC struck and conducted small mutinies. The last APC company sailed for home in the spring of 1946 and the unit was disbanded in 1949. A total of 1,216 APC soldiers perished during the war. During the course of the war APC's personnel were awarded two MBEs, seven Military Medals, eight British Empire Medals, 61 were mentioned in dispatches and 23 Commendations.
