= Raditladi (crater) =

Crater on Mercury

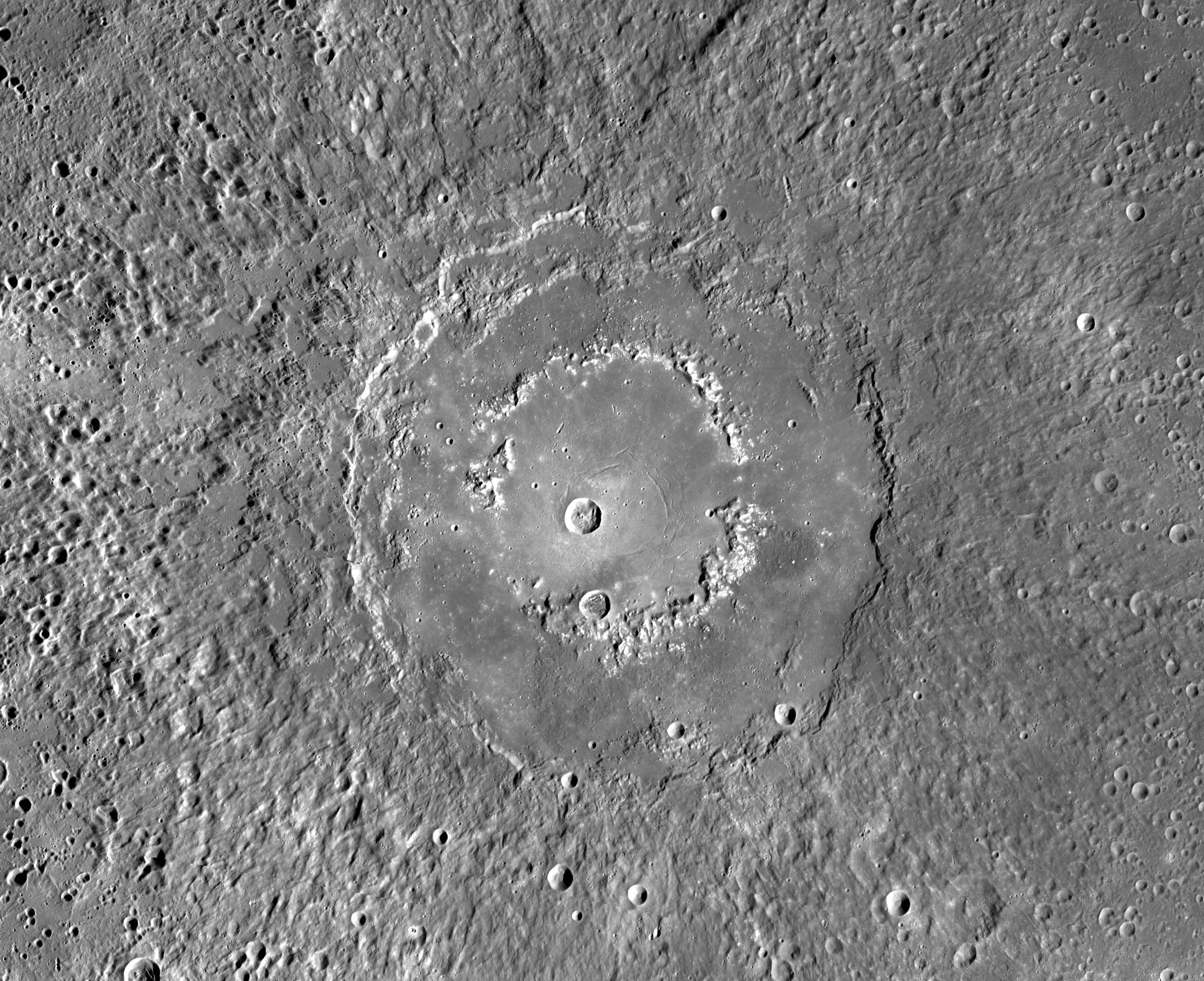
- Mosaic of MESSENGER images
- Feature type: Peak-ring impact basin
- Location: Raditladi quadrangle, Mercury
- Coordinates: 27.15°N 240.94°W
- Diameter: 258 km (160 mi)
- Eponym: Leetile Disang Raditladi

Raditladi is a large impact crater on Mercury with a diameter of 263 km. Inside its peak ring there is a system of concentric extensional troughs (graben), which are rare surface features on Mercury. The floor of Raditladi is partially covered by relatively light smooth plains, which are thought to be a product of the effusive volcanism. The troughs may also have resulted from volcanic processes under the floor of Raditladi. The basin is relatively young, probably younger than one billion years, with only a few small impact craters on its floor and with well-preserved basin walls and peak-ring structure. It is one of 110 peak ring basins on Mercury.

== Background ==
During its first flyby of Mercury in January 2008 MESSENGER spacecraft discovered a large impact crater approximately 2000 km west of the Caloris basin on the part of Mercury's surface previously not seen by spacecraft. This crater (or basin) was subsequently (on 8 April 2008) named Raditladi after Leetile Disang Raditladi (1910–1971), a Motswana playwright and poet. Raditladi is one of the youngest features on Mercury.

== Geology ==
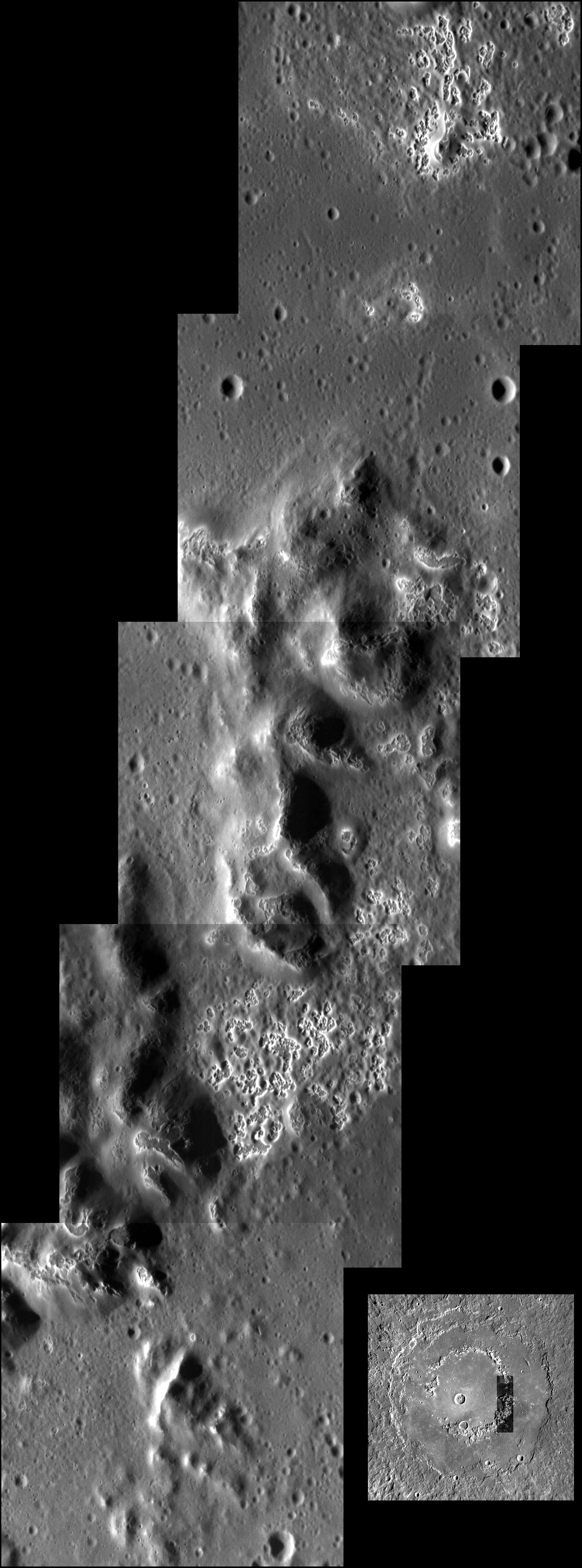
High-resolution mosaic of part of the central peak ring showing hollows. MESSENGER NAC mosaic.

The central part of Raditladi is occupied by a large peak ring with a diameter of 125 km. The ring is slightly offset from the geometrical center of the basin in the north-west direction. The floor of Raditladi is covered by two types of terrain: light smooth plains and dark hummocky plains. The former partially embay the hummocky plains and are probably volcanic in origin. The latter are present mainly on a part of the floor between the peak ring and crater rim; they interpreted to be the original crater floor material not covered by the light colored lavas of smooth plains. The hummocky plains are slightly bluer than smooth plains. The areas outside Raditladi are covered by the dark relatively blue impact ejecta. The peak ring massifs at some places expose a bright blue material identical to one on the floors of some bright Mercurian impact craters (Bright Crater Floor Deposits—BCFD). BCFD in Raditladi are recognized more generally as a subset of a landform now called hollows. A confirmed dark spot is present outside the eastern peak ring of Raditladi. This dark spot is associated with the hollows.

=== Extensional troughs ===
Visible on the floor of Raditladi inside the peak ring are concentric narrow troughs, formed by extension (pulling apart) of the surface. The troughs are arranged in a circular pattern approximately 70 km in diameter. They are thought to be graben. The geometrical center of the system of graben coincides with the center of Raditladi and is offset from the center of the peak ring complex.

Extensional troughs on Mercury are quite rare, having been seen in only a few other locations:

- Rachmaninoff, which is similar in many other ways to Raditladi
- as part of Pantheon Fossae and other troughs in the Caloris basin
- on the floor of Rembrandt, a large basin discovered during MESSENGER's second Mercury flyby.

Understanding how these troughs formed in the young Raditladi basin could provide an important indicator of processes that acted relatively recently in Mercury's geologic history. There are two main theories of graben formation. The first is that they represent a surface manifestation of ring dikes or cone sheets. Both types of structures form when magma from a deep reservoir intrudes into the overlying rocks along conical or cylindrical fractures. The second hypothesis holds that the graben formed as a result of the floor uplift caused by the weight of the smooths plains outside the crater. Such plains are indeed present to the north and east of Raditladi, although their thickness and age are not known.

== Age ==
The relative age of any surface feature can be determined from the density of impact crater on it. The density of craters on the floor of Raditladi is about 10% of that on the plains west of Caloris. The crater density is the same on the ejecta covered plains outside the basin. The smooths plains and hummocky plains also have the same crater density and therefore the same apparent age. The low crater density indicates that Raditladi is much younger than Caloris—it may have formed within the last billion years, whereas the age of Caloris is 3.5–3.9 billion years.

The young age of Raditladi shows that the effusive volcanic activity on Mercury lasted for much longer that had been thought, possibly extending to the last billion years.

== Gallery ==
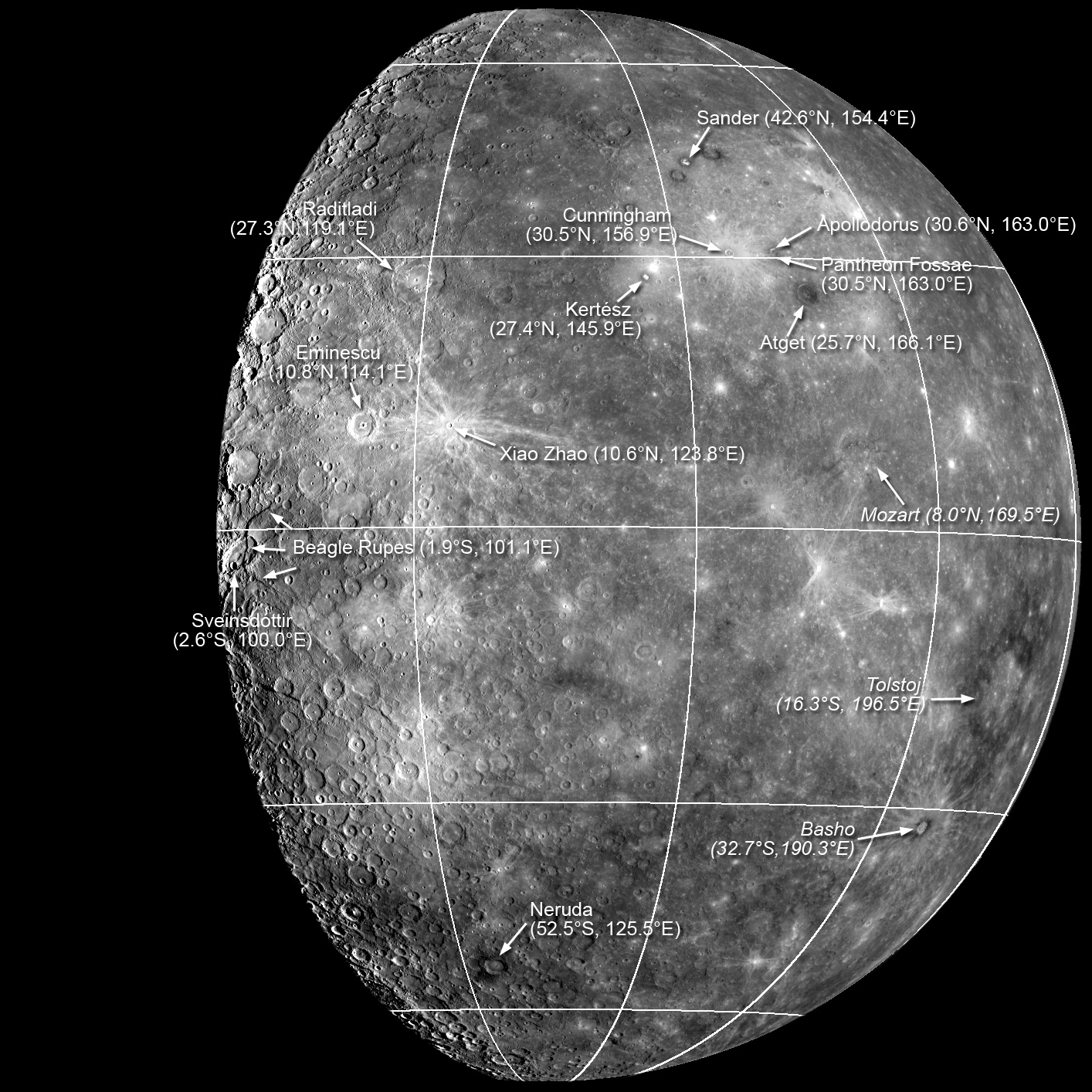
Position of Raditladi on Mercury

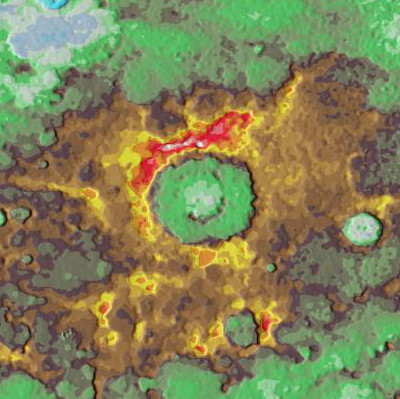
Topography of Raditladi

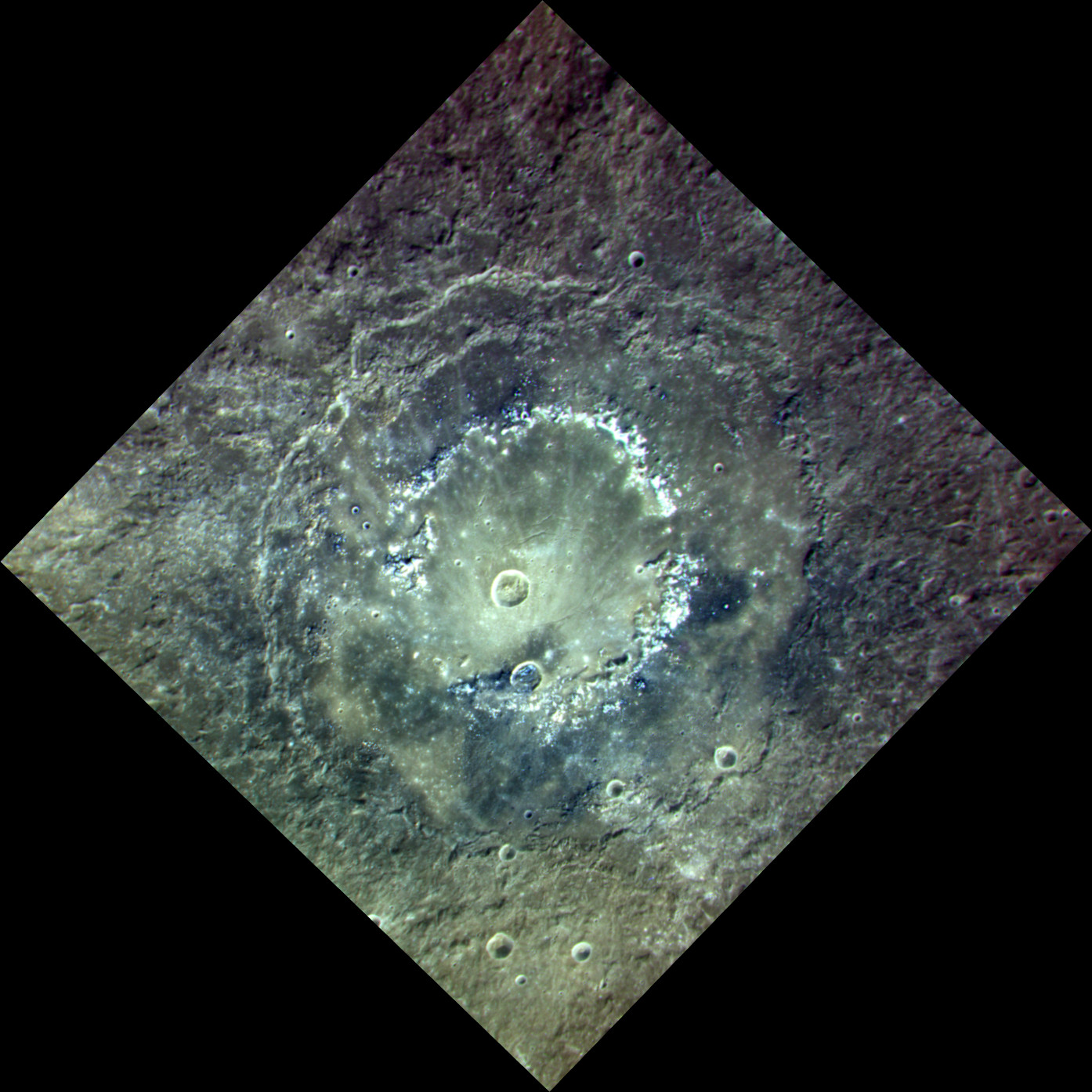
Exaggerated color image of Raditladi

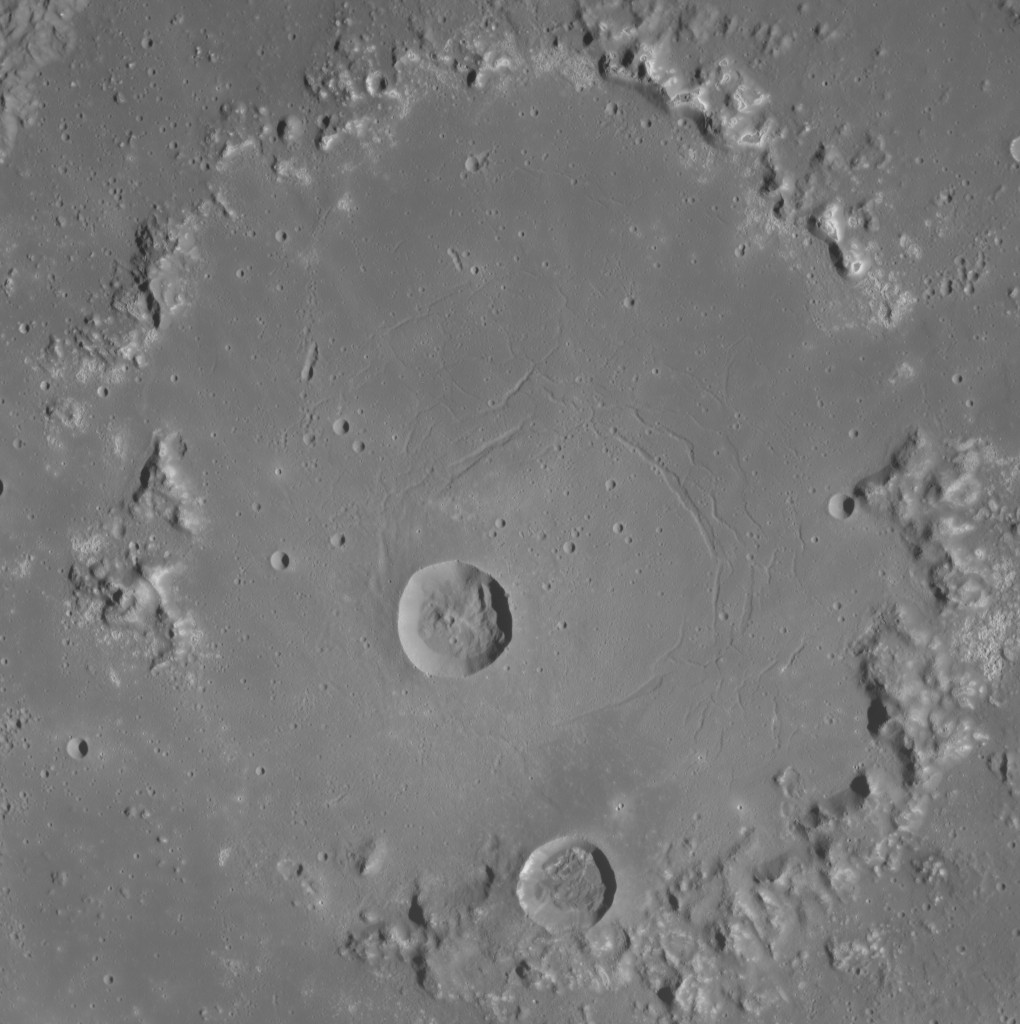
Central peak ring. Concentric troughs are visible.

== See also ==
- Geology of Mercury
