= Kgosikwena Sebele =

Kwena chief

- Title: Regent of the Bakwena
- Term: 1996–2002
- Predecessor: Moithali Sechele II
- Successor: Kgari Sechele III
- Political party: Botswana National Front
- Spouse: MmaMosweu Sebele (m. 2018)
- Father: Kenelakgosi

Edwin Kgosikwena Sebele was regent of the Kwena tribe from 1996 to 2002.

Edwin Kgosikwena Sebele was born in 1944 or 1945. His father was Kenelakgosi. Kgosikwena became regent of the Bakwena for Kgari Sechele III, the underage Bakwena kgosi, in March 1996 upon the death of the previous regent, Moithali Sechele II. Kgari Sechele III became chief on 1 February 2002.

Kgosikwena also served as president of customary court of appeal. He has remained out of public view in his later life. He was accused of stealing a goat in 2009, and he was sentenced to prison in 2010 for stock theft. He was initially sentenced to four years, but it was increased to five on appeal. He was released after a second appeal in 2012.

Kgosikwena was widowed. He remarried on 16 September 2018 to MmaMosweu. He was charged with assault against his wife on 13 January 2023, but he was acquitted later that year after the prosecution failed to appear in court.

Kgosikwena spoke at an event for the Botswana National Front in 2022, of which he is a member.
