= Tshosa =

Kwena chief

- Title: Regent of the Bakwena
- Term: 1803–1807
- Predecessor: Maleke (regent)
- Successor: Motswasele II
- Father: Seitlhamo

Tshosa was a regent of the Kwena tribe from 1803 to 1807. He became regent following the death of his brother Maleke, who was also a regent, and he held the position until he passed it to the Kwena heir, his nephew Motswasele II. After Motswasele's death, Tshosa led a group of the fractured Kwena tribe. He was killed in an attack by the Bakololo.

== Life ==
Tshosa was a son of the Kwena kgosi Seitlhamo, born in the third house, and he was the junior brother of Legwale and Maleke. When Legwale became kgosi, he initiated a raid against another tribe. Tshosa opposed the action, and he allegedly gave the tribe advance warning. Legwale was killed in the raid, and Maleke became regent.

Tshosa became regent in 1803, taking on the role after the death of Maleke. While he was regent of the Bakwena, Tshosa was responsible for defending the tribe from two raids by the Bangwaketse, first in Mantsho and then in Kgomphata. Toward the end of his tenure, Tshosa moved the Kwena tribe from Dithejane to Shokwane. Tshosa's regency ended in 1807 when he passed the role of chief to his nephew and the next in line, Motswasele II. Tshosa's son Moruakgomo disagreed with this decision, desiring the role for himself.

The Kwena tribe fractured after Motswasele's death, and Tshosa led one faction to Borithe, Molepolole, and then Dithubaruba. He successfully defended Molepolole from a raid by the Bangwaketse, who sought to avenge their previous defeats. Tshosa made peace with the Bangwaketse to defend against an invasion by Sebetwane and his Kololo tribe in 1824, but he then fled Dithubaruba and allowed the Bangwaketse to be defeated. From here, he travelled to Lehututu and Lake Ngami. After returning to the land of the Kwena, he reunited his faction with that of Motswasele's son, Sechele I, and they went to Diruthe. Once they settled in Diruthe, the Kwena came into conflict with the Ngwato tribe. The Bangwato aligned with the Bakololo, who then killed Tshosa and Moruakgomo in a raid. Tshosa's wife took their younger son Kgakge to live with the Bangwaketse.
