= Maleke (Kwena) =

Kwena chief

- Title: Regent of the Bakwena
- Term: Began c. 1798
- Predecessor: Legwale
- Successor: Tshosa (regent)
- Father: Seitlhamo

Maleke was a regent of the Kwena tribe. He was the son of kgosi Seitlhamo and the younger brother of kgosi Legwale. Maleke became regent of the Bakwena after Legwale died c. 1798. As kgosi, Maleke led an attack against a Bangwaketse village in Kanye to avenge the death of his father. He burned the village, and he is said to have killed Tawana, the uncle of the village's leader, Makaba. A short time later, Maleke died of rabies after he was bitten by a dog. He was succeeded as regent by his younger brother Tshosa until Legwale's son Motswasele II became kgosi c. 1805.
