= Motswasele II =

Kwena chief (died c. 1821)

- Died: c. 1821; Shokwane
- Title: Kgosi of the Bakwena
- Term: c. 1805 – c. 1821
- Predecessor: Tshosa (regent)
- Successor: Sechele I
- Father: Legwale

Motswasele II (died c. 1821) was the kgosi of the Kwena tribe from c. 1805 until his death c. 1821.

Motswasele was one of three sons of kgosi Legwale, along with Segokotlo and Molese. Legwale died before Motswasele came of age, so Legwale's brother Maleke became regent, and then his brother Tshosa became regent after Maleke's death. Motswasele became kgosi when Tshosa passed the role to him c. 1805.

Motswasele faced attacks from the Ngwaketse shortly after he became kgosi, prompting him to form an alliance with the Kgafela-Kgatl. When the Kwena came into conflict with the Birwa, Motswasele aligned with the Seletlo, and he married the daughter of the Seletlo chief. With her, he had his son Kgosidintsi.

The first contact between the Kwena tribe and Europeans reportedly took place under Motswasele's rule. He received the expedition led by Goddard Edward Donovan and Andrew Cowan in 1808. They gifted him European dishes and mugs, which he could use as proof that he had interacted with Europeans. The Kwena people were not familiar with European craftsmanship, so Motswasele's possession of the items caused him to be seen as Modimowage (transl. god of the village).

Motswasele's rule was characterised by conflict within the Kwena tribe. Throughout his rule, he seized the crops, cattle, and wives of his subjects, and he made frequent use of capital punishment. A dispute with Motswasele caused the Maoto ward to leave the Kwena tribe and join the Ngwaketse tribe. The traditional understanding is that Motswasele gave preferential treatment to the Maoto ward head, Motshebe, so Motshebe's opponents chose not to inform Motshebe when he had been summoned. Motswasele responded to Motshebe's absence by sending mercenaries to his home, and Motshebe led his people away from the tribe.

Moruakgomo, the son of Tshosa, resented that his father made Motswasele kgosi. He responded by turning Motswasele against his supporters, convincing him to penalise them, and then gaining their trust for himself. After gaining support within the tribe, Moruakgomo plotted with Motswasele's brother Segokotlo to assassinate Motswasele. In his pride, Motswasele ignored warnings of the plot. As he left the meeting in Shokwane c. 1821 (Note: Reported as c. 1820 and 1821–1822) where he was set to be assassinated, he was followed and killed by a man wielding an axe. He was buried on the spot where he was killed. Following Motswasele's death, the Kwena tribe underwent a schism as both Moruakgomo and Segokotlo ruled their own factions. This was followed by the conflicts of the Difaqane before the Kwena were reunified under Sechele I.

== Workes cited ==
- Okihiro, Gary Y. (1973). "Resistance and Accommodation: baKwena—baGasechele 1842—52". Botswana Notes and Records. 5: 104–116. ISSN 0525-5090. JSTOR 40979382.
- Schapera, I (1980). "Notes on the Early History of the Kwena (Bakwena-bagaSechele)". Botswana Notes and Records. 12: 83–87. ISSN 0525-5090. JSTOR 40980796.
