= Moithali Sechele II =

Kwena chief

- Died: 1996
- Title: Regent of the Bakwena
- Term: 1986–1996
- Predecessor: Mack Sechele
- Successor: Kgosikwena Sebele
- Father: Mack Sechele

Moithali Sechele II was regent of the Kwena tribe from 1986 to 1996. Moithali was the son of Mack Sechele, regent of the Bakwena. Upon Mack's death in 1986, Moithali was chosen over his elder brother Sentibile to succeed him. Moithali died in March 1996. He did not have any children, and he was succeeded as regent by Kgosikwena Sebele.
