= Moremi III =

Kgosi of Tawana (1915–1946)

Kgosi of the Tawana
- Reign: 1937–1946
- Predecessor: Gaetsalloe
- Successor: Elizabeth Pulane Moremi
- Born: 1915; Orange Free State
- Died: 2 December 1946 (aged 30–31)

Moremi III (1915 – 2 December 1946) was kgosi of Tawana from 1937 until his death in 1946. He was generally popular among the people he ruled, though the British did not always approve of his actions.

== Early and personal life ==
Moremi was born in 1915 and trained to serve as chief from a very early age. He attended the Gaborone Police Camp and later the Tiger Kloof Educational Institute. It was while at Tiger Kloof that Moremi met Elizabeth Pulane Moremi, who was working as a nurse; the two fell in love and were married in 1937. They had three children. The two were not very close after several years because he considered her too "aloof", and he sometimes had a mistress cook food for her. Moremi became friends with Leetile Disang Raditladi when he was at the police camp, and in 1946 Raditladi was hired as his secretary.

== Rule ==
In 1937 he became chief of the BaTawana and the couple moved to Ngamiland. Although Moremi was initially well liked by the people he ruled, the British, who controlled Botswana at the time through the Bechuanaland Protectorate, did not always approve of him. Moremi's reign was characterized by his persona as a "fearless hunter" and his opposition to independence of the OvaHerero people. He saw declining popularity in the face of World War II and the destruction that came with it, and Moremi was suspended by the British in 1945 over allegations of corruption. His reign was described as doing "little to improve the poor reputation of some of the Tawana chiefs." Moremi was killed in a car crash on 2 December 1946. His wife succeeded him to act as regent of the tribe.

The Moremi Wildlife Reserve, which his wife played a major role in the creation of, was named after him.
