= Sechele II =

Kwena chief (c. 1860–1918)

- Born: c. 1860
- Died: 1918
- Title: Kgosi of the Bakwena
- Term: 1911–1918
- Predecessor: Sebele I
- Successor: Sebele II
- Children: Sebele II

Sechele II Kealeboga Sebele (c. 1860–1918) was kgosi of the Kwena tribe in the Bechuanaland Protectorate (modern day Botswana) from 1911 until his death in 1918. His rule was marked by a split within the tribe as opposing dikgosana led by his uncles rejected his authority. Sechele II was succeeded by his son Sebele II.

== Life ==
Sechele II Kealeboga Sebele was born c. 1860, and he became kgosi of the Kwena tribe in 1911.

Sechele II's reign was plagued by an opposition group of dikgosana led by his uncles Kebohula and Moiteelasilo. The group felt that he was promoting too many advisors who did not have seniority in the tribe, and they opposed his endorsement of un-Christian traditional practices such as polygamy and bogwera. This group was supported by the London Missionary Society, whom Sechele II had alienated after he allowed Anglicanism to be practiced by the Bakwena in 1912. A schism occurred in 1915, when Sechele II moved the tribe's kgotla from Borakalalo to Ntsweng, reversing a move by his predecessor. The opposition remained in Borakalalo, effectively splitting the tribe. The schism was not remedied until 1937, when the British forced them to merge and destroyed much of Ntsweng.

Sechele II had a wife, Lena Rauwe, who oversaw the introduction of Anglicanism in Kweneng. He also married Gagoumakwe Kgari Sechele, an activist who continued to hold political influence after Sechele II's death. Sechele II's secretary as kgosi was Richard Sidzumo.

Sechele II allowed the BaKwena Tribal Council to form in May 1916, but he limited its power by promoting his own allies. Baruti Kgosidintsi, a major opposition figure against Sebele I and Sechele II, was found guilty of impregnating Sechele II's ex-wife in 1916.

== Death and legacy ==
Sechele II died in 1918. He was then succeeded on 12 February 1918 by his son Sebele II, after the latter's return from serving in the South African Native Labour Corps. Sechele II's grandson Bonewamang Padi Sechele was recognised as a legitimate heir of the Kwena chiefdom in 1963 but the court denied that he was next to succeed. Sechele II's younger son, Neale Sechele, was chosen by the colonial administration as a compromise and appointed as kgosi, but his rule was not welcomed by the Bakwena. Bonewamang Padi Sechele later served as tribal authority of the Kweneng District from 1970 to 1978 after Neale Sechele's removal.
