= Moremi Game Reserve =

Protected area in Botswana

Coordinates: 19°10′S 23°10′E

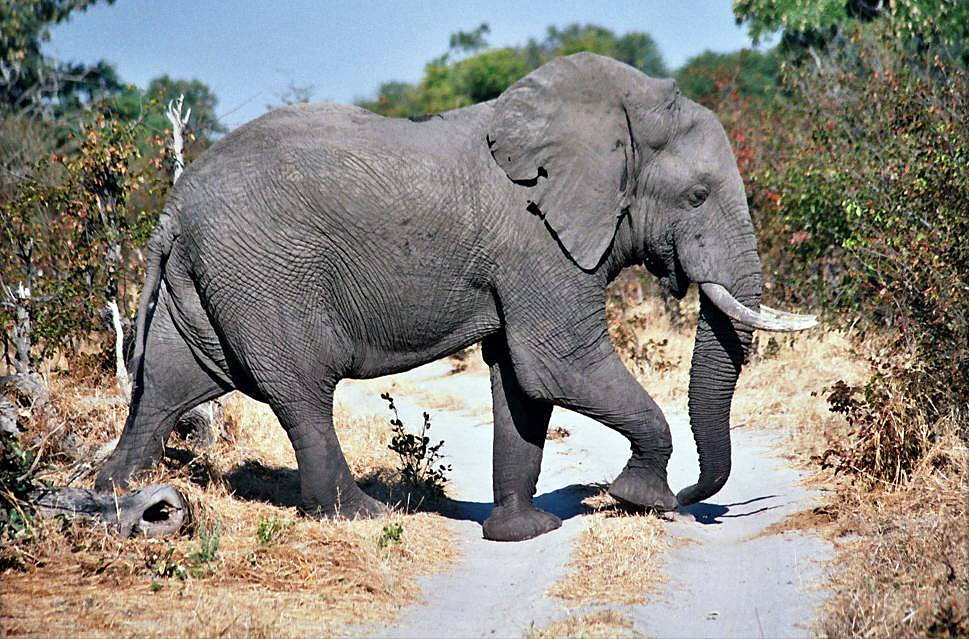
An elephant crossing road in Moremi Game Reserve

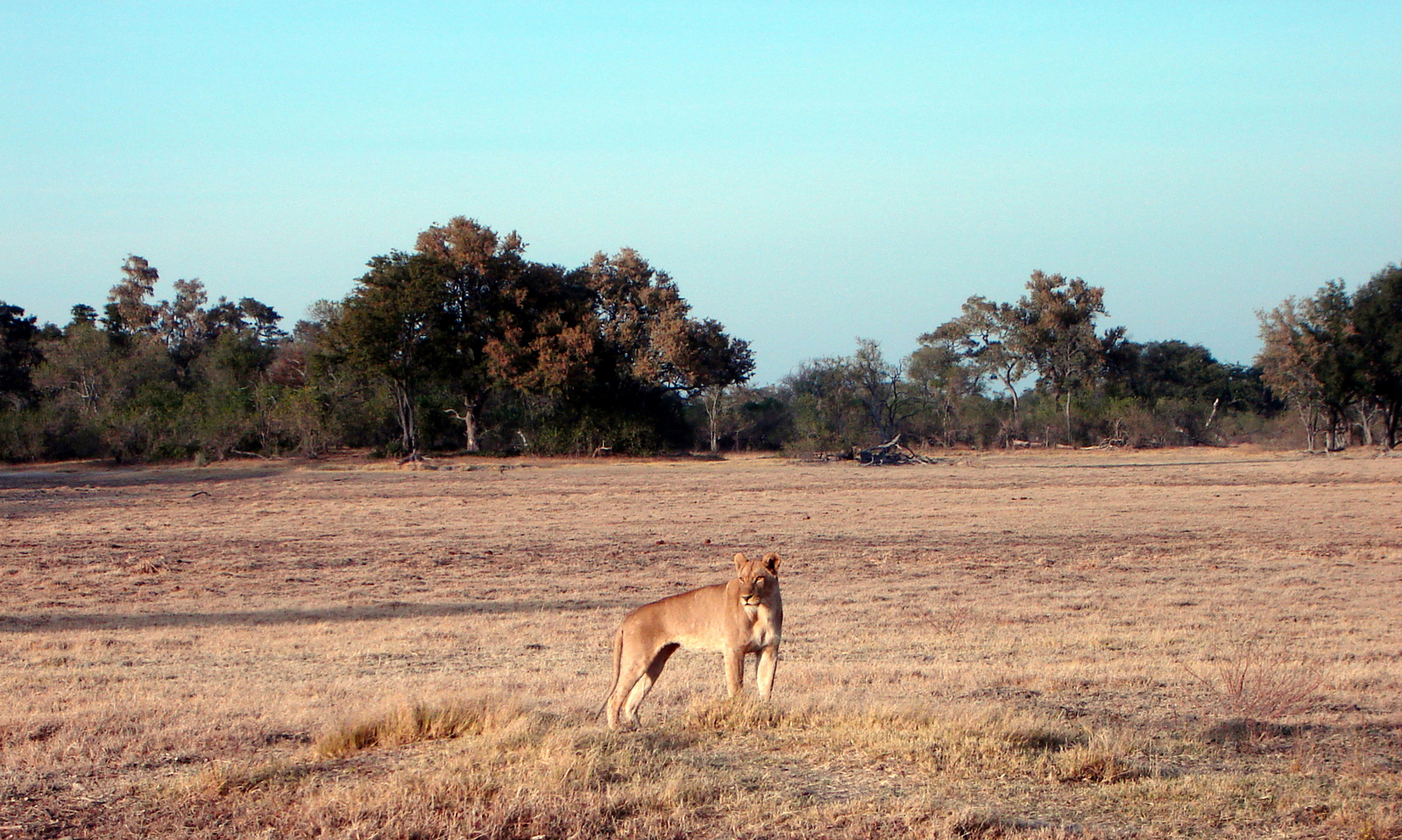
A lioness in Moremi Game Reserve

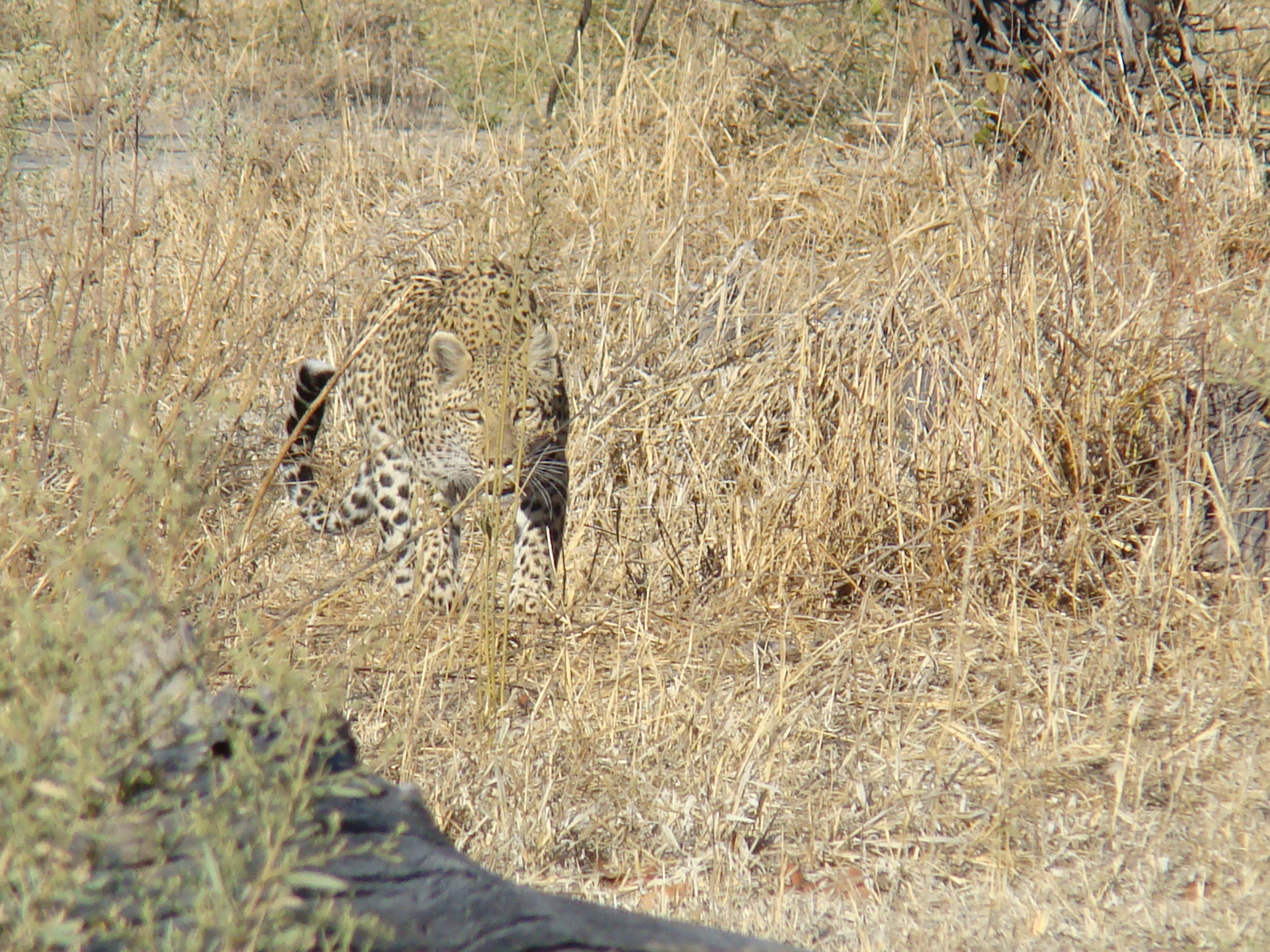
A leopard stalking through the grass

Moremi Game Reserve is a protected area in Botswana. It lies on the eastern side of the Okavango Delta and was named after Chief Moremi of the BaTawana tribe. Moremi was designated as a game reserve, rather than a national park, when it was created. This designation meant that the Bushmen, known locally the BaSarwa, that had traditionally lived there were allowed to stay in the reserve.

== Location and setting ==
Moremi Game Reserve is just under 5,000 square kilometres (1,900 sq mi) in extent, covering much of the eastern side of the Okavango Delta and combining permanent water with drier areas, which create some startling and unexpected contrasts. Some prominent geographical features of the Reserve are Chiefs Island and the Moremi Tongue. In the Moremi Reserve one can experience excellent views of savannah game as well as bird-watching on the lagoons. There are also thickly wooded areas, which are home to the Cape wild dog (Lycaon pictus pictus) and leopard. To the northeast lies the Chobe National Park which borders the Moremi Game Reserve. Only about 30% of the reserve is mainland, with the bulk being within the Okavango Delta itself.

This reserve is part of the 5 Nation Kavango–Zambezi Transfrontier Conservation Area.

== Fauna and flora ==
Moremi Game Reserve, although not one of the largest parks, presents insights and views even for the most experienced of travelers. Its habitats are surprisingly diverse, combining mopane woodland and acacia forests, floodplains and lagoons. It is home to nearly 500 species of bird (from water birds to forest dwellers), and a vast array of other species of wildlife including lion, leopard, African bush elephant, African buffalo, black rhinoceros, hippopotamus, giraffe, plains zebra, blue wildebeest, cheetah, spotted hyena, black-backed jackal, common warthog, impala, and lechwe. The Moremi area is considered a significant habitat for African wild dog and the population there have been the subject of a project run in the area since 1989; thus this species is often seen wearing collars emplaced by researchers.

== History ==
Proclaimed a reserve in 1963, it was named after Chief Moremi III of the local Batawana tribe from Ngamiland. Chief Moremi's widow, Elizabeth Pulane Moremi, - who was ruling the area at the time, took steps to conserve the wildlife due to her concern about the toll hunting was taking on the animal population. In the 1970s Chief Moremi's Royal Hunting Grounds were included into the Reserve to further expand it.

== Logistics ==
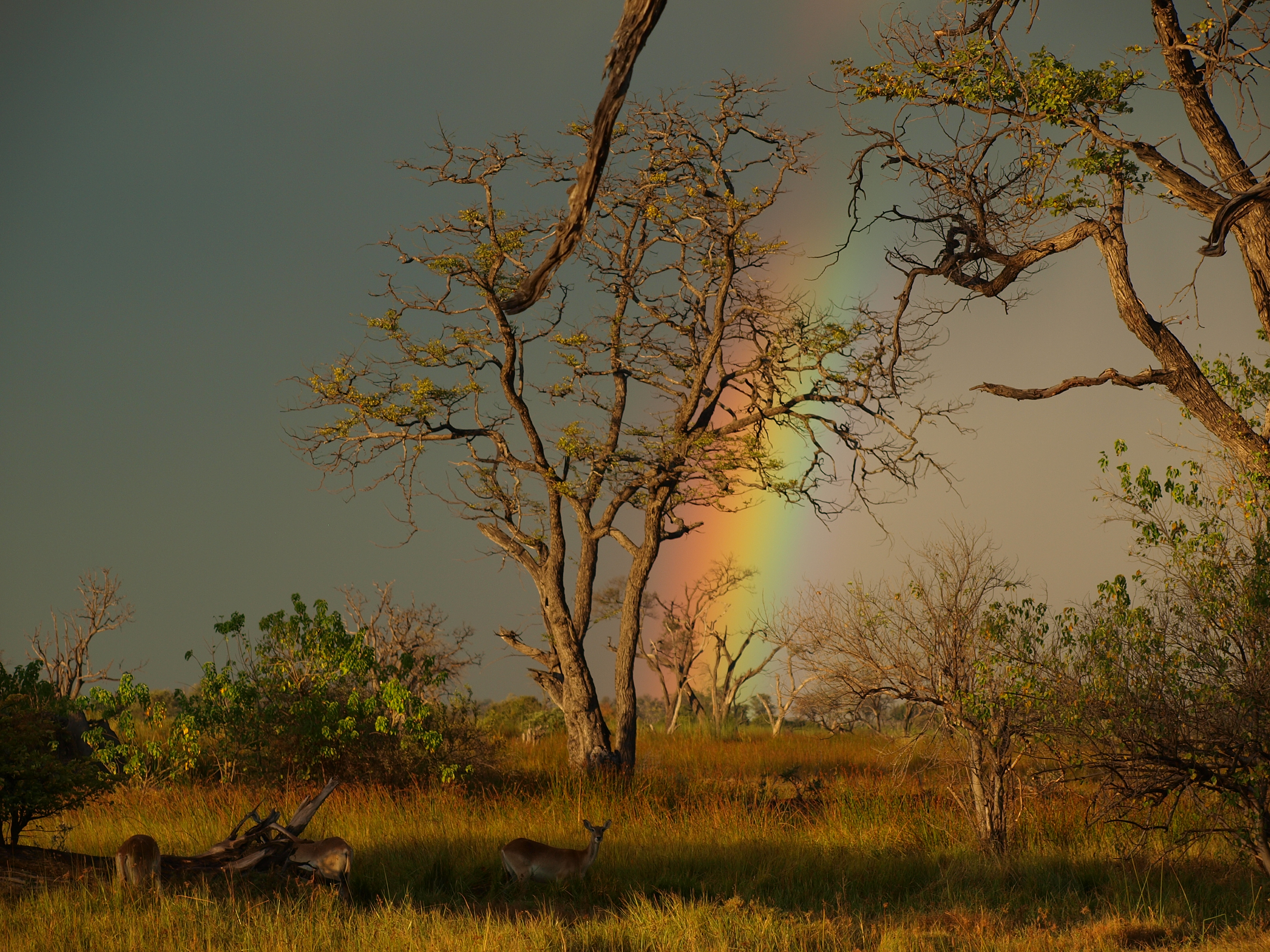
Moremi Xakanaxa rainy weather

The Reserve offers the opportunity to explore not only in 4x4's but on foot and by mokoro - a dug-out canoe, hewn from either ebony or sausage-tree, and poled by your personal guide. Although, today most of the mekoro (plural of mokoro), are made from fibreglass, thus helping to preserve the magnificent, and old, trees of the area.

Game viewing is at its peak from July to October, when seasonal pans dry up and the wildlife concentrates on the permanent water. From October until the start of the rains in late November or early December, the weather can be extremely hot.

Malarial mosquitoes are prevalent throughout the Reserve and it is strongly recommended that visitors should take precautions before, during and after a visit.

Botswana has been able to develop its tourism without the urgent need for revenues that face many other African countries. An eco-tourism policy of high yield, but low impact, has resulted in visitors being able to experience an Africa in its most natural, unspoilt and impressive condition. Thus the Reserve itself has very few lodges, and only four areas set-aside for camping (at South Gate, Third Bridge, Xakanaxa, and Khwai). There are a number of lodges on the outskirts of the Reserve, whose guests visit on daily game drives.

Travel between lodges is accomplished by light aircraft and helicopter transfers, as most lodges have their own airstrips. Therefore, you can easily combine a number of lodges in a variety of areas. Helicopter game viewing flights are available from most lodges.

=== Roads ===
Roads in Moremi Game Reserve change dramatically depending upon the season and the water level of the Delta. When the flood waters are high some of the roads are waterlogged while sandy areas which are much harder to navigate during the hot summer months. Moremi Game Reserve is a low impact park, which means that there are few vehicles and people around. This is great for game viewing as you are often alone at a sighting, but it also means that help isn't readily available away from the main roads. Ensure you have a sufficient recovery kit and know how to use it, and you'll need a snorkel on your vehicle for water crossings. If you are driving a rental vehicle, double check the rental company's rules and regulation regarding driving through water.

== Poaching ==
Starting April 2019, poaching has risen at an alarming rate in the reserve. Organised poaching rings slaughtered 46 rhinos in 10 months, representing almost 10% of Botswana's 500 rhinos. Officials feared a wipeout of both rhino species, as most of Botswana's rhinos roam the grassy plains of the northern Okavango Delta, where Moremi Game Reserve is situated. The poaching is driven by the insatiable demand for rhino horn, which fetches up to $60,000 / kg.
