= Tsetseng =

- Village
- Location in Botswana
- Coordinates: 23°31′25″S 23°2′31″E
- Country: Botswana
- District: Kweneng District

Population (2001)
  - Total: 395

Tsetseng is a village in Kweneng District of Botswana. It is located in Kalahari Desert, 40 km north-east of Kang. The population was 395 in 2001 census. The Tsetseng population was 395 on November 16, 2010.
