= Age set =

Social category or corporate social group

In anthropology, an age set is a social category or corporate social group, consisting of people of similar age, who have a common identity, maintain close ties over a prolonged period, and together pass through a series of age-related statuses. This is in contrast to an age grade, through which people pass individually over time.

While a year group or class in a school could be regarded as a simple example of an age set (e.g. 'Class of 2004'), the term is most commonly used to refer to systems in tribal societies. The phenomenon is most prevalent in East Africa, central Brazil and parts of New Guinea, where in many societies the importance of social groupings based on age eclipses that of social groupings based on kinship and descent. Age sets in these societies are formed by the periodic grouping together of young people—usually men—into a corporate unit with a name and a collective identity. As its members age the set stays together and increases in seniority as older sets die off and new ones are formed beneath it.

Age sets and the systems within which they exist can be regarded as either cyclical or progressive. In a cyclical system there is a finite number of sets and each recurs over the course of a few generations, with new membership. In progressive systems an age set appears once, and when its members have died it ceases to exist. It is often the case that cultures with either cyclical or progressive systems have equivalent ideas about cosmology and the nature of time.

== A typical example ==
South-East African systems provide the classic examples, such as the Zulu impi system of fighting regiments based on age sets.

Keesing (1981) gives the example of the Karimojong of Uganda, among whom around six age sets are active at any one time, with young adult men being initiated into the most junior, which is closed after fifty or sixty years, and a new one formally opened. As befits the complex nature of many East African systems, Karimojong age sets are themselves grouped into generation sets consisting of five consecutive age sets. There are four such generation sets in all; each permanently named and recurring cyclically roughly every century. At a given time, two of the generation sets will be active: one junior and one senior. Generation sets are paired in alternate fashion, with two whose members wear brass ornaments and are symbolically regarded as yellow, alternating with two whose members wear copper ornaments and are symbolically regarded as red. The names of individual age sets are chosen from a stock associated with each pair of generation sets, but do not have a fixed sequence.

When most members of a generation set have died off, its surviving age sets are retired and the junior generation set becomes senior. At this point, new initiates become the first members of the next generation set in the sequence. The senior generation set is responsible for initiating new members into the most junior age set of the junior generation set, and each age set is formally subordinate to the one above it. While members of an age set live with their immediate families and local kin groups, and age sets are not tightly organised internally, they serve to apportion roles and status in wider social situations, with senior age sets having a judicial function, for example.

The Oromo people and their Gadaa System are also another good example of a society whose social organization resolves around age sets.

== See also ==
- Generation
- Coeval
