= Ntsweng =

Former village in Botswana

Coordinates: 24°25′23″S 25°31′30″E

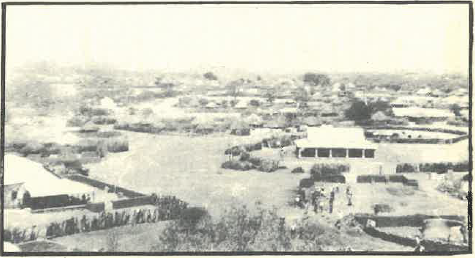
Ntsweng c. 1928

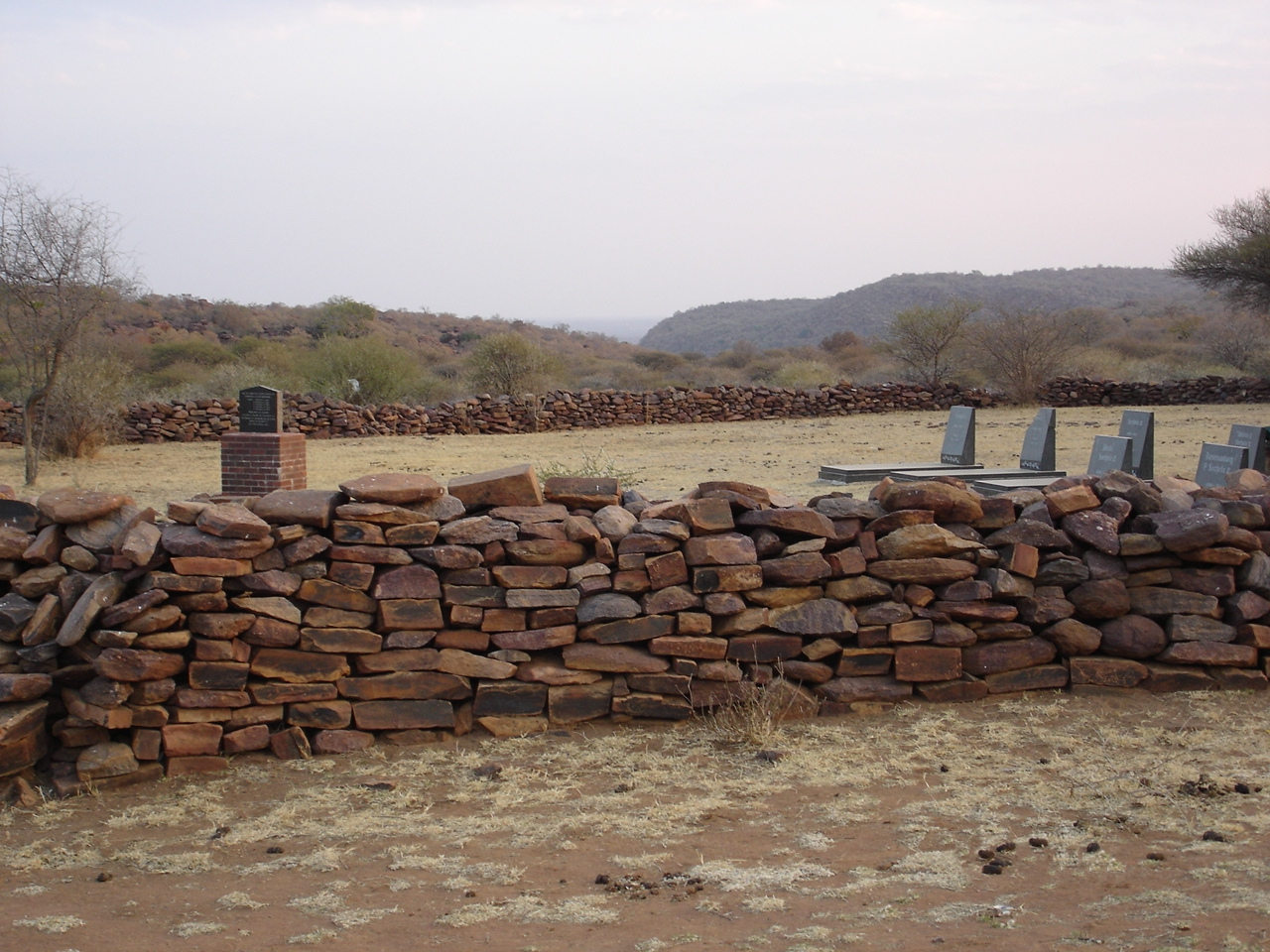
Ruins of the Bakwena Royal Cemetery in Ntsweng

Ntsweng was a village in Botswana. It was the capital of the Bakwena tribe while it was under the rule of Sechele I. Sechele had Ntsweng built on a hill for defensive purposes when he relocated the Bakwena capital. Its ruins are in present-day village of Molepolole and it is a protected historical site by the National Museum and Monuments.
