= Kwena clan =

Ethic group in Southern Africa

The Bakwena or Bakoena ("those who venerate the crocodile") are a large Sotho-Tswana clan in Southern Africa of the southern Bantu group. They can be found in different parts of southern Africa such as Lesotho, Botswana, South Africa and Eswatini. "Kwena" is a Sotho/Tswana/Sepedi word meaning "crocodile", the crocodile is also their totem (seboko).

== Genealogy and history ==
The earliest ancestor of the Kwena clan, Kwena, was a grandson of Masilo I, the King of Bahurutse clan around 1360 CE. Kwena and his followers settled at Tebang, now called Heidelberg. Around 1500 CE, Bakwena started spreading in the region, from the Lekwa River to Kalahari (Botswana) until settling at Ntsoanatsatsi (mythical origin land of the Sotho-Tswana people) with the Bafokeng around 1580 CE.

== Early leaders ==
- Kwena (dates unknown)
- Phokotsea (dates unknown)
- Kgabo I (late 17th century)
- Tebele (late 17th or early 18th century)

== Basotho Line ==
This branch of Bakwena descends from Napo, son of Masilo II, born from a junior wife. This branch eventually broke off from Motjhudi's line.

Name	Lifespan	Reign start	Reign end	Notes	Family	Image
Napo	Late 1400s – Early 1500s	c. 1490 – 1500	Early 1500s	Father of Motebang (Batebang), Lisema (Bahlakoana), and Molapo (Makhoakhoa).	Son of Masilo II (Masito).	
Motebang	Early to Mid-1500s	Early 1500s	Mid-1500s	Father of Molemo	Son of Napo	
Molemo	Mid to Late 1500s	Mid-1500s	Late 1500s	Father of Tsholo (Bamodibedi), and Tsholoane (Bamonaheng).	Son of Molemo	
Tsholoane	Late 1500s – Early 1600s	Late 1500s	Early 1600s	Father of Kadi (who became known as Monaheng).	Son of Molemo	
Monaheng: (Kali)	c. 1600s – Early 1700s	Mid-1600s	Early 1700s	Father of Mokheseng (Bamarabe), Monyane (Bamonaheng), Motlohelwa (Basekake), Ntsane (Bamantsane), Mokotedi and Motloang (Bamokotedi, clan of Moshoeshoe I).	Son of Tsholoane	

King Moshoeshoe I, Paramount Chief of the Basotho, was a member of the Bamokotedi clan as well as the subsequent House of Moshoeshoe, the ruling house of Lesotho.

== Batswana line ==
Kgabo II led a small group of Bakwena and crossed the Madikwe River and founded a tribe on the lands of the Bakgatla tribe (whose totem was the blue monkey) which they drove away, modern day Botswana. As the result of a split, several tribes like the Ngwato and Ngwaketse.

- Kgabo II (until c. 1740)
- Motshodi (c. 1740 – c. 1770)
- Motswasele I (c. 1770 – c. 1785)
- Seitlhamo (late 18th century)
- Legwale (late 18th century)
- Maleke (early 19th century; regent)
- Tshosa (early 19th century; regent)
- Motswasele II (c. 1807–1821)
- Sechele I (c. 1829–1892)
- Sebele I (1892–1911)
- Sechele II (1911–1918)
- Sebele II (1918–1931)
- Kgari Sechele II (1931–1962)
- Neale Sechele (1963–1970)
- Bonewamang Padi Sechele (1970–1978; appointed as the Tribal Authority)
- Mack Sechele (1978–1986; regent)
- Moithali Sechele II (1986–1996; regent)
- Kgosikwena Sebele (1996–2002; regent)
- Kgari Sechele III (2002–present)
