= Tiger Kloof Educational Institute =

Tiger Kloof Combined School is a school near Vryburg, South Africa.

Tiger Kloof had its origins in the Moffat Institute at Kuruman, part of the educational endeavours of the London Missionary Society in that part of South Africa. When the Moffat Institute closed it was reincarnated, in 1905, as the Tiger Kloof Institute, situated about ten kilometers south of Vryburg. Tiger Kloof was a high school, teachers' training college, Bible college and trade school all rolled into one. Clergyman W.C. Willoughby led the efforts to build a school together with the Batswana chiefs in the area. Economic developments and the construction of a railroad from Victoria Falls to Kimberley led the London Missionary Society to open the school.

Arthington Memorial Church was built from 1925 to 1933.

The introduction of Bantu Education Act and the Group Areas Act under Apartheid during the 1950s, however, sounded the death knell for the London Missionary Society's educational efforts here and in the Northern Cape. The London Missionary Society left the school in 1956, in protest against the Bantu Education Act, which they found to be discriminatory against black South Africans. Tiger Kloof continued to function as a public school, but some buildings burned and the school was eventually closed in 1963. Tiger Kloof was closed down, but not before its pupils had risen in protest at the new legislation.

In the late 1980s provincial heritage site status was given to the empty shell of the abandoned Tiger Kloof Institute. In 1991 a meeting of Old Tigers was initiated by Joe Wing, a missionary. They formed a board of directors and started working toward reopening Tiger Kloof. They celebrated its re-opening in October 1995. The remainder of Tiger Kloof's original property was returned through the land restitution process in 2004. Another phase of development began; they opened a primary school.

== Notable alumni ==
Two future Presidents of Botswana, Seretse Khama and Quett Masire, began their studies there. The Kgosi of the Bangwaketse, Bathoen II also studied here. Nakatindi Yeta Nganga, one of the first female MPs in Zambia, also attended the school.
