= Kgotla =

Traditional community council in southern Africa

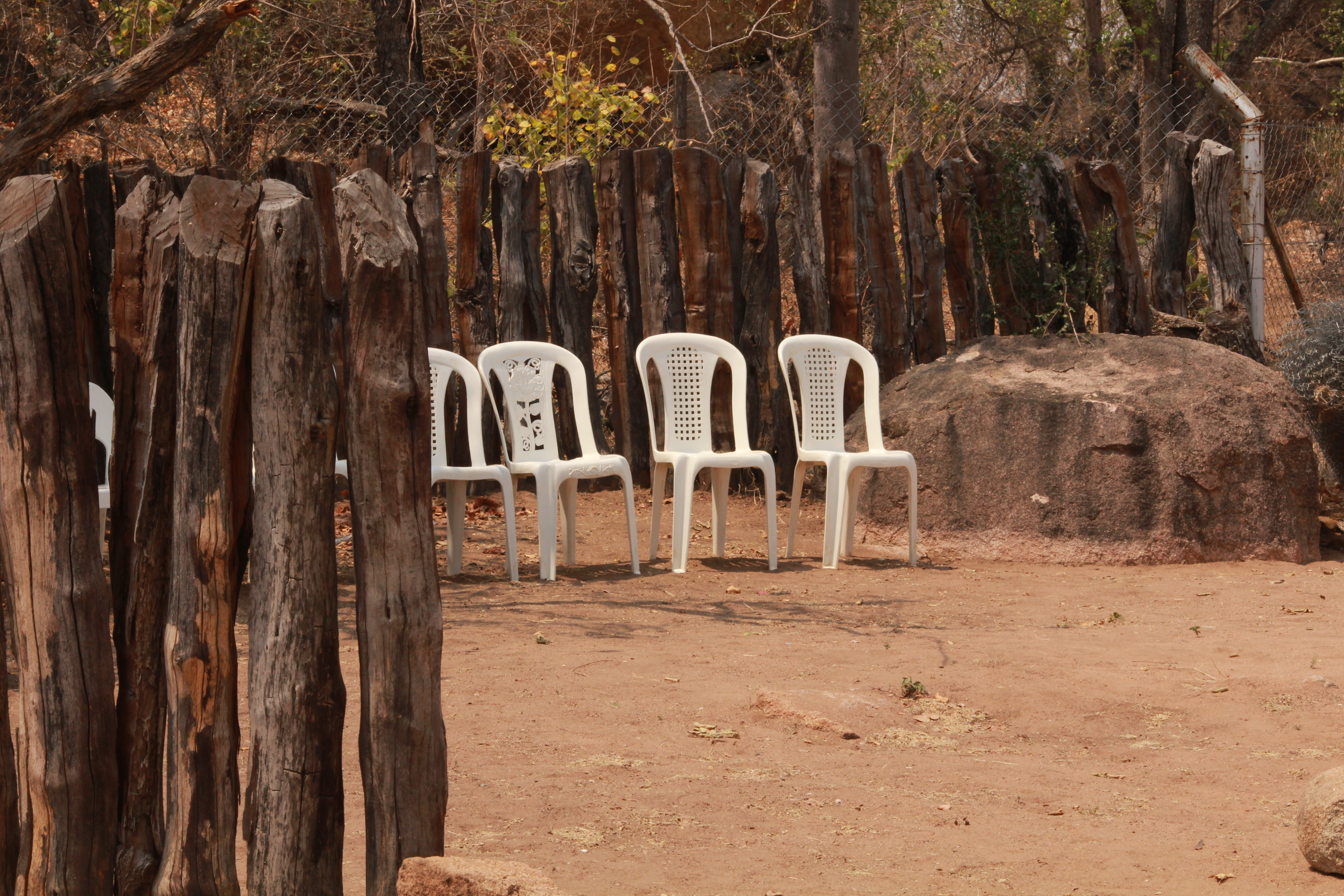
A kgotla at Domboshaba

A kgotla (English pronunciation /ˈkoʊt.lə/ or /kˈɡɒt.lə/) is a public meeting, community council, or traditional law court of a Botswana village and in rural Lesotho and South Africa. It is usually headed by the village chief or headman, and community decisions are always arrived at by consensus. Headmen usually work as the advisers to the chief. No one may interrupt while another is having their say. Because of this tradition, Botswana claims to be one of the world's oldest democracies.

The custom of allowing everyone their full say is carried over into meetings of all kinds, from discussing a bill to a staff briefing.

Kgotla can also refer to the place where such meetings are held. This can range from a few chairs under a shade canopy to a permanent ground with covered seating. In both senses, the term is a loan word in Botswana English from Setswana, where it means court.

In South African English, a lekgotla is a meeting called by government to discuss strategy planning. The term is still a loan word from Setswana, again meaning court. Usually there are men who stay at the Kgotla mostly during the day. These men are usually sent to go and call law defaulters.
