= List of populated places in Botswana =

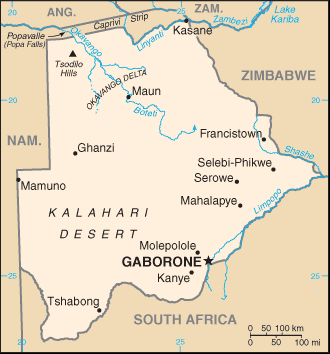
Map of Botswana

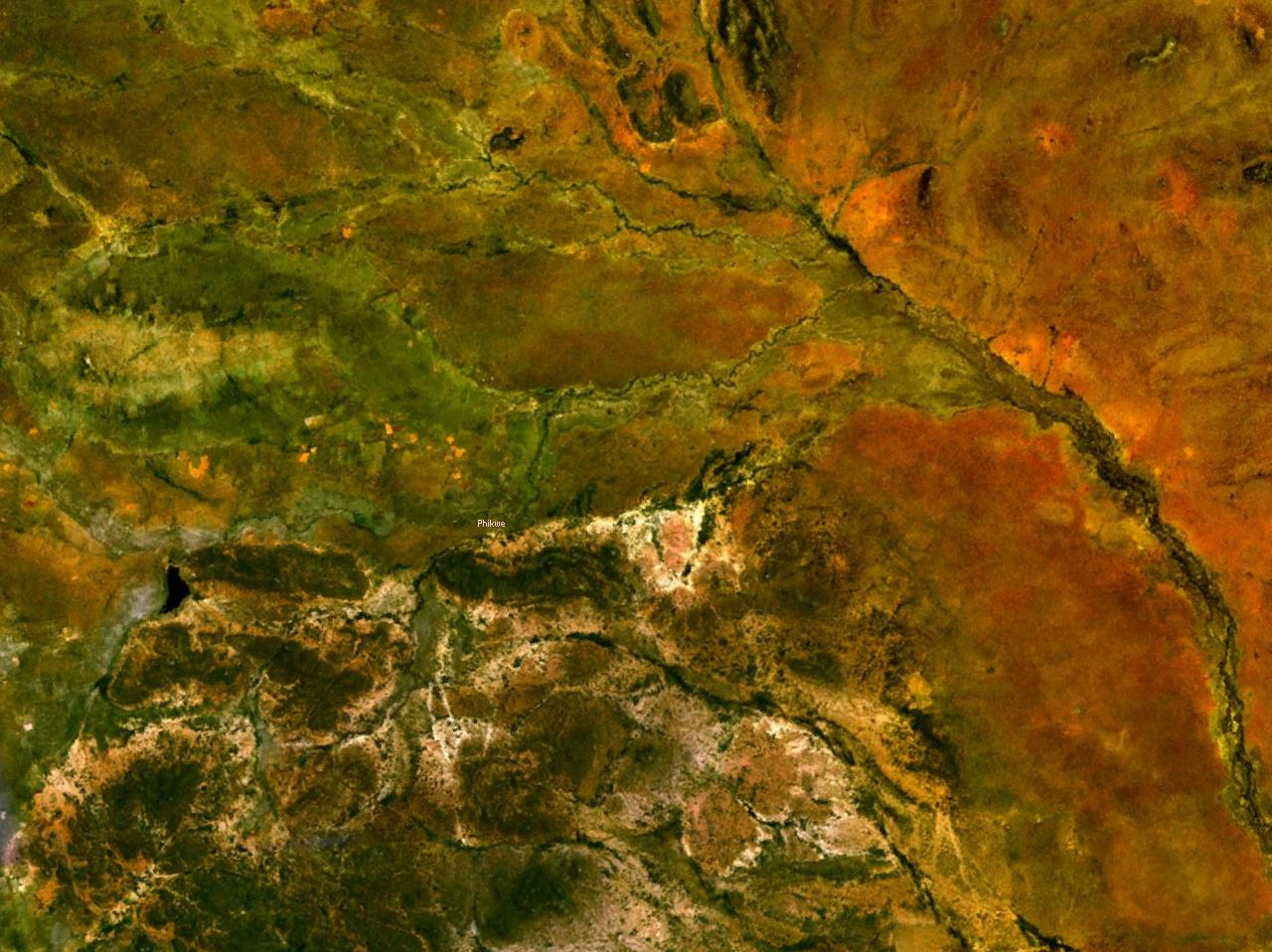
Selibe Phikwe

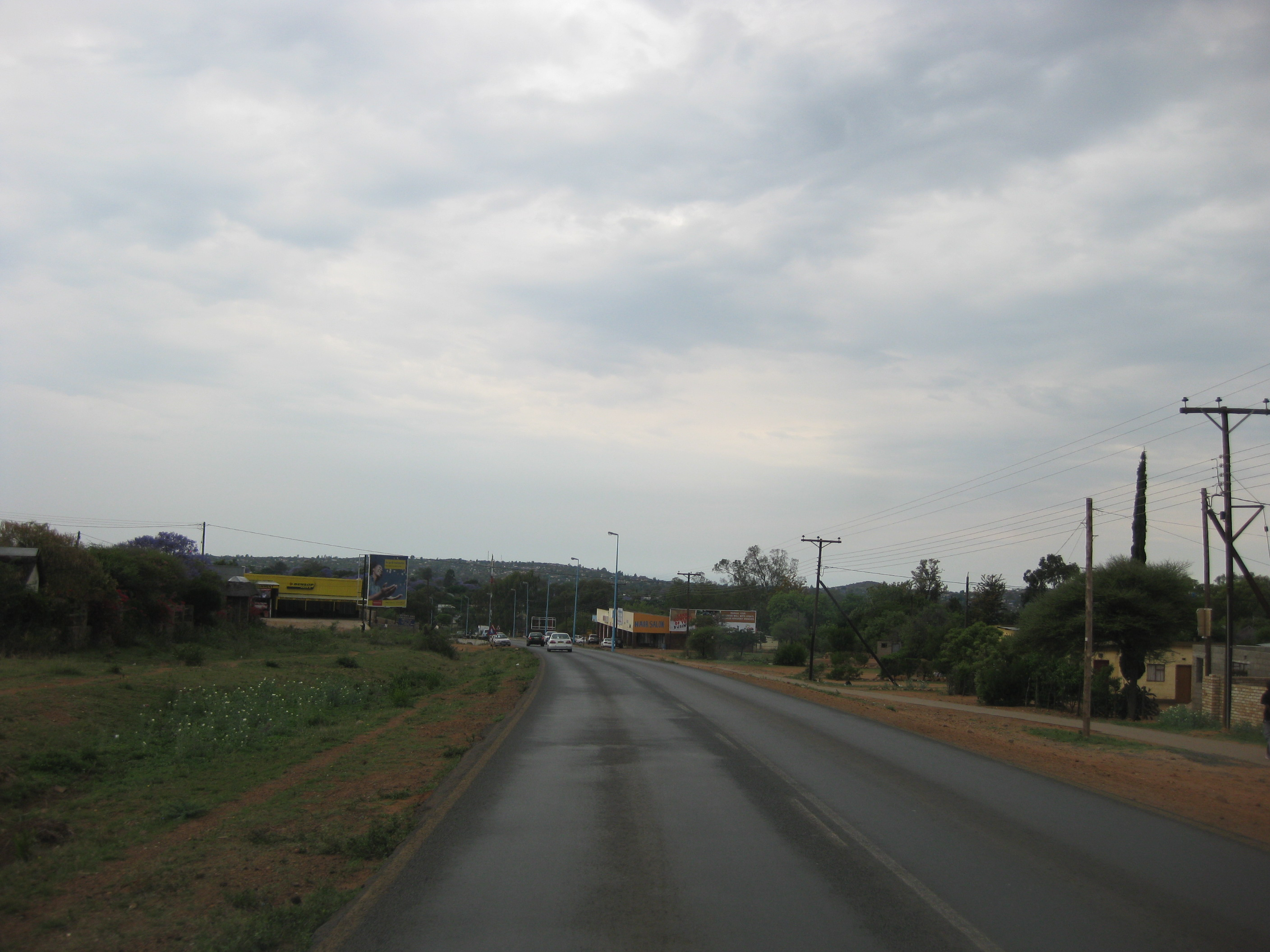
Kanye

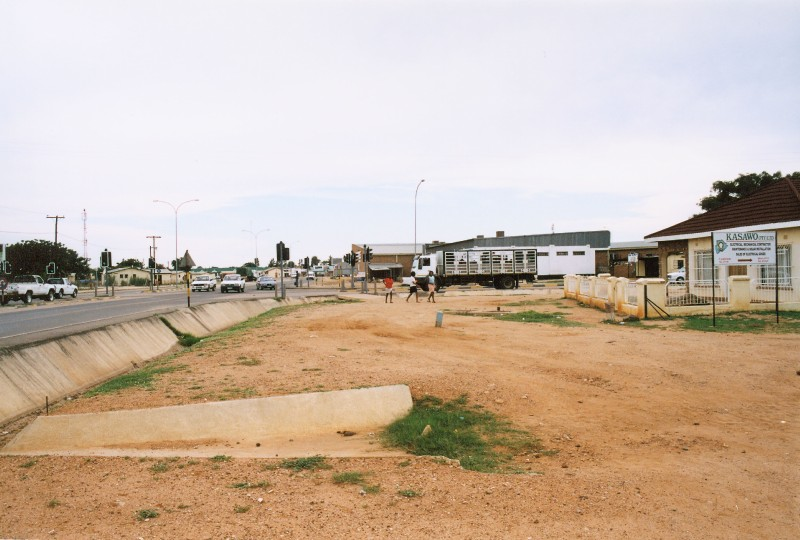
Mahalapye

The following is a list of cities and towns or villages in Botswana with population of over 1,000 citizens in the year 2022. Capitals of the administrative divisions (cities, towns or districts) are shown in boldface.

Rank	Name	City, Town or District	Population 2011	Population 2022	Change
1.	**Gaborone**	Gaborone	231,592	246,325	+6.36%
2.	**Francistown**	Francistown	98,961	103,417	+4.50%
3.	Mogoditshane	Kweneng District	58,632	88,004	+50.10%
4.	**Maun**	North-West District	65,693	85,350	+29.92%
5.	**Molepolole**	Kweneng District	73,103	74,861	+2.40%
6.	**Serowe**	Central District	57,588	55,676	−3.32%
7.	Tlokweng	South-East District	37,364	55,508	+48.56%
8.	Palapye	Central District	41,102	52,636	+28.06%
9.	**Mochudi**	Kgatleng District	47,001	50,321	+7.06%
10.	Mahalapye	Central District	46,418	48,431	+4.34%
11.	**Kanye**	Southern District	52,214	48,028	−8.02%
12.	**Selibe Phikwe**	Selibe Phikwe	49,411	42,488	−14.01%
13.	Letlhakane	Central District	26,393	36,404	+37.93%
14.	**Ramotswa**	South-East District	30,381	33,271	+9.51%
15.	**Lobatse**	Lobatse	29,007	29,772	+2.64%
16.	Mmopane	Kweneng District	17,845	25,460	+42.67%
17.	Thamaga	Kweneng District	23,096	25,300	+9.54%
18.	Moshupa	Southern District	24,231	23,858	−1.54%
19.	Tonota	Central District	24,007	23,296	−2.96%
20.	Bobonong	Central District	22,483	21,216	−5.64%
21.	Gabane	Kweneng District	16,671	20,027	+20.13%
22.	**Ghanzi**	Ghanzi District	16,276	19,012	+16.81%
23.	**Jwaneng**	Jwaneng	18,008	18,784	+4.31%
24.	Tutume	Central District	18,295	18,582	+1.57%
25.	Kopong	Kweneng District	11,099	13,823	+24.54%
26.	Mmadinare	Central District	15,177	13,198	−13.04%
27.	Tati Siding	North-East District	8,197	12,404	+51.32%
28.	**Tshabong**	Kgalagadi District	9,489	11,651	+22.78%
29.	Metsimotlhabe	Kweneng District	9,270	11,617	+25.32%
30.	Gumare	North-West District	8,970	11,572	+29.01%
31.	Shakawe	North-West District	7,420	10,589	+42.71%
32.	Oodi	Kgatleng District	5,874	10,257	+74.62%
33.	Bokaa	Kgatleng District	6,462	9,146	+41.54%
34.	**Kasane**	Chobe District	9,244	9,143	−1.09%
35.	Borolong	Central District	5,269	8,917	+69.24%
36.	Shoshong	Central District	11,884	8,887	−25.22%
37.	Molapowabojang	Southern District	9,433	8,722	−7.54%
38.	Kazungula	Chobe District	4,320	8,704	+101.48%
39.	**Orapa**	Orapa	9,531	8,648	−9.26%
40.	Letlhakeng	Kweneng District	9,871	8,343	−15.48%
41.	Nata	Central District	7,732	7,779	+0.61%
42.	Rakops	Central District	7,240	7,439	+2.75%
43.	Mmankgodi	Kweneng District	7,459	7,396	−0.84%
44.	Lerala	Central District	7,455	7,204	−3.37%
45.	Otse	South-East District	7,976	6,986	−12.41%
46.	Kumakwane	Kweneng District	5,901	6,826	+15.68%
47.	Sese	Southern District	2,721	6,798	+149.83%
48.	Kang	Kgalagadi District	6,570	6,764	+2.95%
49.	Lentsweletau	Kweneng District	7,467	6,653	−10.90%
50.	Ramotswa station/Taung	South-East District	4,250	6,286	+47.91%
51.	**Masunga**	North-East District	5,666	6,216	+9.71%
52.	Lotlhakane	Southern District	5,210	6,045	+16.03%
53.	Sefophe	Central District	6,938	6,001	−13.51%
54.	Rasesa	Kgatleng District	4,491	5,966	+32.84%
55.	Maitengwe	Central District	6,216	5,929	−4.62%
56.	Mathangwane	Central District	5,983	5,918	−1.09%
57.	Shashe-Mooke	Central District	4,028	5,897	+46.40%
58.	Good Hope	Southern District	6,377	5,672	−11.06%
59.	Gweta	Central District	7,016	5,548	−20.92%
60.	Mmathethe	Southern District	6,928	5,421	−21.75%
61.	Sefhare	Central District	5,295	5,381	+1.62%
62.	Chadibe	Central District	5,218	5,371	+2.93%
63.	Tsetsebjwe	Central District	4,848	5,248	+8.25%
64.	Hukuntsi	Kgalagadi District	4,751	5,224	+9.96%
65.	Charles Hill	Ghanzi District	3,791	5,164	+36.22%
66.	Morwa	Kgatleng District	3,566	4,988	+39.88%
67.	Mandunyane	Central District	3,589	4,584	+27.72%
68.	Etsha 6	North-West District	3,130	4,570	+46.01%
69.	Digawana	Southern District	3,296	4,356	+32.16%
70.	Mokatse	Kgatleng District	0	4,321	NA
71.	Pitsane Siding	Southern District	3,654	4,312	+18.01%
72.	Mopipi	Central District	3,912	4,115	+5.19%
73.	Dukwi	Central District	3,438	4,075	+18.53%
74.	Nkange	Central District	3,550	4,006	+12.85%
75.	Matshelagabedi	North-East District	2,871	3,987	+38.87%
76.	Ramokgonami	Central District	4,486	3,932	−12.35%
77.	Sebina	Central District	3,276	3,865	+17.98%
78.	Maunatlala	Central District	4,552	3,862	−15.16%
79.	Shashe-Mooke	Central District	3,136	3,805	+21.33%
80.	Manyana	Southern District	3,550	3,752	+5.69%
81.	Chadibe	Central District	2,973	3,678	+23.71%
82.	Modipane	Kgatleng District	3,197	3,624	+13.36%
83.	Takatokwane	Kweneng District	2,728	3,444	+26.25%
84.	Etsha 13	North-West District	2,377	3,401	+43.08%
85.	Lecheng	Central District	3,344	3,352	+0.24%
86.	Werda	Kgalagadi District	3,261	3,349	+2.70%
87.	Moiyabana	Central District	3,571	3,264	−8.60%
88.	Gakuto	Kweneng District	1,350	3,227	+139.04%
89.	Pilane	Kgatleng District	1,795	3,222	+79.50%
90.	Ranaka	Southern District	2,409	3,207	+33.13%
91.	Matebeleng	Kgatleng District	2,196	3,198	+45.63%
92.	Radisele	Central District	2,985	3,164	+6.00%
93.	Khudumelapye	Kweneng District	2,080	3,135	+50.72%
94.	Khakhea	Southern District	2,944	3,084	+4.76%
95.	Serule	Central District	3,241	3,062	−5.52%
96.	Matlapana	North-West District	1,449	3,043	+110.01%
97.	Mogorosi	Central District	2,716	3,027	+11.45%
98.	Tobane	Central District	2,075	3,001	+44.63%
99.	Mookane	Central District	2,983	3,001	+0.60%
100.	Mmashoro	Central District	2,834	2,939	+3.71%
101.	Thebephatshwa Air Base (BDFCamp)	Kweneng District	2,690	2,929	+8.88%
102.	Mogobane	South-East District	2,400	2,926	+21.92%
103.	**Sowa**	Sowa	3,598	2,914	−19.01%
104.	Thabala	Central District	2,429	2,911	+19.84%
105.	Ntlhantlhe	Southern District	2,342	2,842	+21.35%
106.	Dekar	Ghanzi District	1,668	2,814	+68.71%
107.	Malolwane	Kgatleng District	2,406	2,806	+16.63%
108.	Seronga	North-West District	2,674	2,796	+4.56%
109.	Machaneng	Central District	2,537	2,786	+9.81%
110.	Pandamatenga	Chobe District	1,798	2,750	+52.95%
111.	Paje	Central District	2,507	2,735	+9.09%
112.	Molalatau	Central District	2,396	2,703	+12.81%
113.	Sehithwa	North-West District	2,748	2,703	−1.64%
114.	Tumasera	Central District	3,136	2,636	−15.94%
115.	Ditshegwane	Kweneng District	2,114	2,607	+23.32%
116.	Salajwe	Kweneng District	2,440	2,602	+6.64%
117.	Mokoboxane	Central District	1,594	2,598	+62.99%
118.	Mathathane	Central District	2,672	2,587	−3.18%
119.	Mmathubudukwane	Kgatleng District	2,203	2,517	+14.25%
120.	Nokaneng	North-West District	2,067	2,510	+21.43%
121.	Mabutsane	Southern District	2,386	2,507	+5.07%
122.	Mohembo West	North-West District	1,770	2,500	+41.24%
123.	Marapong	Central District	2,283	2,493	+9.20%
124.	Nshakashokwe	Central District	2,168	2,491	+14.90%
125.	Senete	Central District	2,440	2,457	+0.70%
126.	Artisia	Kgatleng District	2,365	2,422	+2.41%
127.	Sojwe	Kweneng District	3,983	2,419	−39.27%
128.	Mabeleapudi	Central District	2,247	2,407	+7.12%
129.	Lesenepole	Central District	3,048	2,403	−21.16%
130.	Mosolotshane	Central District	2,017	2,375	+17.75%
131.	Tshesebe	North-East District	2,277	2,375	+4.30%
132.	Matsiloje	North-East District	2,380	2,368	−0.50%
133.	Otse	Central District	1,787	2,360	+32.06%
134.	Kalamare	Central District	2,196	2,350	+7.01%
135.	Ratholo	Central District	2,236	2,338	+4.56%
136.	Mokobeng	Central District	2,535	2,257	−10.97%
137.	Ncojane	Ghanzi District	1,958	2,242	+14.50%
138.	Nswazwi	Central District	2,185	2,239	+2.47%
139.	Lorolwana	Southern District	1,568	2,225	+41.90%
140.	Mogapi	Central District	1,939	2,214	+14.18%
141.	Makobo	Central District	1,268	2,191	+72.79%
142.	Tsamaya	North-East District	2,387	2,190	−8.25%
143.	Tsau	North-West District	2,000	2,144	+7.20%
144.	Mmatseta	Kweneng District	474	2,120	+347.26%
145.	Seleka	Central District	1,157	2,115	+82.80%
146.	Maokane	Southern District	2,044	2,098	+2.64%
147.	Sepopa	North-West District	2,283	2,090	−8.45%
148.	Mabesekwa	Central District	1,528	2,085	+36.45%
149.	Moletemane	Central District	1,664	2,077	+24.82%
150.	Tshimoyapula	Central District	1,626	2,073	+27.49%
151.	Mosetse	Central District	1,787	2,064	+15.50%
152.	Lotlhakane West	Southern District	1,637	2,056	+25.60%
153.	Mokubilo	Central District	1,917	2,047	+6.78%
154.	Xhumo	Central District	1,684	2,041	+21.20%
155.	Lehututu	Kgalagadi District	1,956	2,035	+4.04%
156.	Sesung	Kweneng District	752	2,014	+167.82%
157.	Moroka	North-East District	1,692	2,000	+18.20%
158.	Gobojango	Central District	2,138	1,981	−7.34%
159.	Rakhuna	Southern District	1,355	1,980	+46.13%
160.	Marobela	Central District	1,672	1,970	+17.82%
161.	Moshaneng	Southern District	1,512	1,961	+29.70%
162.	Themashanga	North-East District	1,648	1,955	+18.63%
163.	Tsootsha	Ghanzi District	1,848	1,911	+3.41%
164.	Gojwane	Central District	1,411	1,888	+33.81%
165.	Kauxwhi	North-West District	2,040	1,888	−7.45%
166.	Kudumatse	Central District	2,030	1,876	−7.59%
167.	Malatswai	Central District	1,482	1,867	+25.98%
168.	Mmanoko	Kweneng District	932	1,861	+99.68%
169.	Toteng	North-West District	902	1,854	+105.54%
170.	Mabule	Southern District	2,260	1,835	−18.81%
171.	Maboane	Kweneng District	1,085	1,811	+66.91%
172.	Makwate	Central District	1,611	1,806	+12.10%
173.	Lokgwabe	Kgalagadi District	1,417	1,792	+26.46%
174.	Motlhabaneng	Central District	1,456	1,790	+22.94%
175.	Dimajwe	Central District	1,423	1,788	+25.65%
176.	Makopong	Kgalagadi District	1,697	1,788	+5.36%
177.	Majwaneng	Central District	1,903	1,779	−6.52%
178.	Zwenshambe	North-East District	1,943	1,776	−8.59%
179.	Ditladi	North-East District	1,344	1,756	+30.65%
180.	Mogapinyana	Central District	1,528	1,754	+14.79%
181.	Magotlhwane	Southern District	1,433	1,751	+22.19%
182.	Selokolela	Southern District	1,610	1,750	+8.70%
183.	Lorwana	Southern District	1,177	1,721	+46.22%
184.	Motokwe	Kweneng District	1,413	1,720	+21.73%
185.	Mmatshumo	Central District	1,122	1,719	+53.21%
186.	Moshaweng	Kweneng District	1,222	1,700	+39.12%
187.	Mosu	Central District	1,792	1,697	−5.30%
188.	Kokotsha	Kgalagadi District	1,224	1,696	+38.56%
189.	Kgomokasitwa	Southern District	1,423	1,669	+17.29%
190.	Samochema	North-West District	1,149	1,667	+45.08%
191.	Goshwe	Central District	1,573	1,640	+4.26%
192.	Natale	Central District	1,288	1,638	+27.17%
193.	Phitshane Molopo	Southern District	1,945	1,625	−16.45%
194.	New Xade	Ghanzi District	1,269	1,619	+27.58%
195.	Gamodubu	Kweneng District	501	1,613	+221.96%
196.	Topisi	Central District	1,545	1,607	+4.01%
197.	Seolwane	Central District	1,280	1,596	+24.69%
198.	Xakao	North-West District	1,565	1,594	+1.85%
199.	Kgagodi	Central District	1,756	1,593	−9.28%
200.	Zoroga	Central District	1,358	1,592	+17.23%
201.	Makalamabedi	Central District	1,674	1,591	−4.96%
202.	Kodibeleng	Central District	1,298	1,589	+22.42%
203.	Ramatlabama	Southern District	1,328	1,588	+19.58%
204.	Tshokwe	Central District	1,070	1,586	+48.22%
205.	Mafongo	Central District	1,151	1,583	+37.53%
206.	Sikwane	Kgatleng District	1,466	1,580	+7.78%
207.	Ramokgwebana	North-East District	1,548	1,565	+1.10%
208.	Kedia	Central District	1,237	1,563	+26.35%
209.	Etsha 1	North-West District	965	1,554	+61.04%
210.	Matobo	Central District	1,136	1,553	+36.71%
211.	Nlakhwane	North-East District	1,583	1,547	−2.27%
212.	Damochojena	Central District	993	1,527	+53.78%
213.	Pitseng	Southern District	1,074	1,526	+42.09%
214.	Khwee	Central District	1,196	1,509	+26.17%
215.	Matsitama	Central District	1,309	1,502	+14.74%
216.	Beetsha	North-West District	941	1,502	+59.62%
217.	Nxamasere	North-West District	1,584	1,501	−5.24%
218.	Semolale	Central District	1,288	1,497	+16.23%
219.	Botlhapatlou	Kweneng District	1,223	1,493	+22.08%
220.	Senyawe	North-East District	1,339	1,481	+10.60%
221.	Sekoma	Southern District	1,190	1,471	+23.61%
222.	Dutlwe	Kweneng District	1,055	1,464	+38.77%
223.	Makaleng	North-East District	1,256	1,463	+16.48%
224.	Mapoka	North-East District	1,789	1,457	−18.56%
225.	Gootau	Central District	1,401	1,455	+3.85%
226.	Tamasane	Central District	1,144	1,426	+24.65%
227.	Malwelwe	Kweneng District	1,146	1,414	+23.39%
228.	Phepheng	Kgalagadi District	994	1,411	+41.95%
229.	Boatlaname	Kweneng District	1,049	1,405	+33.94%
230.	Dibete Station	Central District	1,083	1,403	+29.55%
231.	Kutamogree	Central District	1,035	1,397	+34.98%
232.	Dinokwe	Central District	1,229	1,392	+13.26%
233.	Borotsi	Central District	1,501	1,388	−7.53%
234.	Jackalas 2	North-East District	1,222	1,388	+13.58%
235.	Sorilatholo	Kweneng District	897	1,373	+53.07%
236.	Siviya	North-East District	1,289	1,366	+5.97%
237.	Kareng	North-West District	1,259	1,361	+8.10%
238.	Jackalas 1	North-East District	1,093	1,352	+23.70%
239.	Pilikwe	Central District	1,282	1,346	+4.99%
240.	Mmaphashalala	Central District	1,044	1,342	+28.54%
241.	Ngarange	North-West District	988	1,336	+35.22%
242.	Lekgolobotlo	Southern District	1,177	1,334	+13.34%
243.	Tloaneng	Kweneng District	868	1,326	+52.76%
244.	Hatsalatladi	Kweneng District	726	1,314	+80.99%
245.	Maape	Central District	1,337	1,314	−1.72%
246.	Moralane	Central District	866	1,310	+51.27%
247.	Khawa	Kgalagadi District	817	1,299	+59.00%
248.	Bray	Kgalagadi District	1,041	1,286	+23.54%
249.	Kaudwane	Kweneng District	1,084	1,283	+18.36%
250.	Sehunou	Central District	1,049	1,274	+21.45%
251.	Shakwe	Central District	976	1,272	+30.33%
252.	Motopi	Central District	1,340	1,272	−5.07%
253.	Sekhutlane	Southern District	871	1,266	+45.35%
254.	Omaweneno	Kgalagadi District	917	1,256	+36.97%
255.	Mokolodi	Kweneng District	624	1,250	+100.32%
256.	Motshegaletau	Central District	958	1,238	+29.23%
257.	Lesoma	Chobe District	613	1,235	+101.47%
258.	Mabalane	Kgatleng District	738	1,227	+66.26%
259.	Kuke	Ghanzi District	833	1,226	+47.18%
260.	Shashe Bridge	North-East District	1,095	1,225	+11.87%
261.	Keng	Southern District	992	1,220	+22.98%
262.	Kachikau	Chobe District	1,356	1,214	−10.47%
263.	Groote Laagte	Ghanzi District	849	1,206	+42.05%
264.	Serinane	Kweneng District	787	1,198	+52.22%
265.	Matlhakola	Central District	996	1,192	+19.68%
266.	Moshopha	Central District	1,373	1,191	−13.26%
267.	Gasita	Southern District	1,063	1,188	+11.76%
268.	Mahotshwane	Southern District	861	1,181	+37.17%
269.	Mulambakwena	North-East District	974	1,177	+20.84%
270.	Tlhankane	Southern District	722	1,154	+59.83%
271.	Sepako	Central District	682	1,152	+68.91%
272.	Mosojane	North-East District	1,210	1,145	−5.37%
273.	Kokong	Southern District	928	1,141	+22.95%
274.	Leologane	Kweneng District	823	1,128	+37.06%
275.	Ngware	Kweneng District	919	1,124	+22.31%
276.	Gani	North-West District	727	1,119	+53.92%
277.	Malaka	Central District	1,044	1,112	+6.51%
278.	West Hanahai	Ghanzi District	662	1,101	+66.31%
279.	Gathwane	Southern District	879	1,099	+25.03%
280.	Karakobis	Ghanzi District	881	1,096	+24.40%
281.	Tshane	Kgalagadi District	1,020	1,092	+7.06%
282.	Borotsi	Central District	942	1,086	+15.29%
283.	Bodibeng	North-West District	778	1,083	+39.20%
284.	Mogonye	Southern District	577	1,081	+87.35%
285.	Jamataka	Central District	650	1,079	+66.00%
286.	Mogomotho	North-West District	843	1,078	+27.88%
287.	Mokhomba	Southern District	959	1,077	+12.30%
288.	Lepokole	Central District	955	1,051	+10.05%
289.	Dagwi	Central District	454	1,048	+130.84%
290.	Magoriapitse	Southern District	846	1,048	+23.88%
291.	Mmeya	Central District	752	1,043	+38.70%
292.	Qabo	Ghanzi District	762	1,042	+36.75%
293.	Metlobo	Southern District	891	1,039	+16.61%
294.	Malotwana Siding	Kgatleng District	608	1,037	+70.56%
295.	Shorobe	North-West District	1,031	1,027	−0.39%
296.	Qangwa	North-West District	683	1,018	+49.05%
297.	Kumaga	Central District	758	1,016	+34.04%
298.	Pitsana-Potokwe	Southern District	816	1,012	+24.02%
299.	Segwagwa	Southern District	1,056	1,008	−4.55%
300.	Dovedale	Central District	832	1,006	+20.91%
301.	Chobokwane	Ghanzi District	771	1,005	+30.35%
302.	Parakarungu	Chobe District	845	1,005	+18.93%
303.	Mmadikola	Central District	830	1,004	+20.96%
304.	Mokgenene	Central District	835	1,000	+19.76%
