= Manyana Rock Paintings =

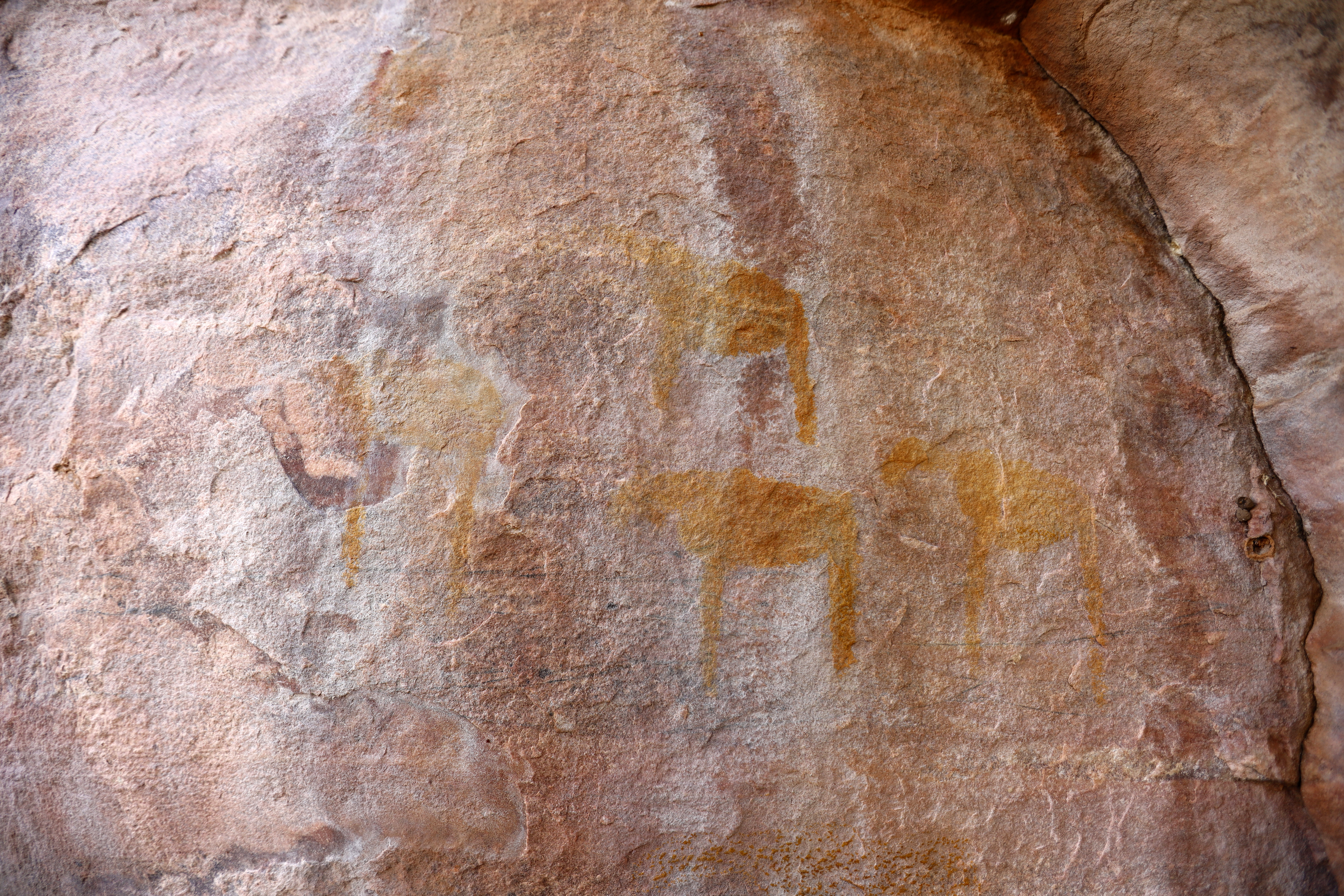
- Four yellow animals

- Manyana Rock Paintings
- 24°45′52″S 25°35′28″E
- Location: Kweneng District, Botswana

The Manyana Rock Paintings are a collection of rock art and caves located at the Kolobeng hills, neighbouring Manyana, Southern District, Botswana. It is believed that the artworks were made by the Khoikhoi or the San people between 1100 AD and 1700 AD. The paintings are found on five cliff areas around the rocky hill. Today, the site is fenced and protected as a National Monument.

== Geography ==
The paintings cover 5 separate rock surfaces, along approximately 750 meters of the base of the Kolobeng hills, 1.2 km above sea level. The site is close to the village of Manyana, Southern district but lies within the borders of the Kweneng district.

== Artworks ==
The paintings include designs of mammals, plants and abstract shapes. All of the mammals were portrayed sideways with only two legs, except human figures, most of which seem to face forward. It is believed that the paintings were created by witch doctors as part of religious activities. These rituals also incorporate dancing as an attempt to connect with the spirits of ancestors. The ink used for the paintings were created by mixing soft rocks like bauxite and animal body fluids like blood.

Due to natural weathering, a lot of the paintings have faded. As a result, the number of tourists visiting the site have declined.

== Archaeology ==
Rock paintings are scarce in southeast Botswana and the Manyana Rock Paintings are the only ones that have been excavated. Artifacts recovered from excavations suggest that the earliest occupation of this area took place between the 1st century and the 8th century, during the Later Stone Age. The Iron Age pottery uncovered suggests that the locals made their first contact with Iron Age herders between the 10th century and the 13th century.

Excavations uncovered more than 7000 Later Stone Age artifacts, more than 95% are debitage. The remaining 5% is made up of scrapers, grindstones, hammerstones and crescents. Other unearthed items include quartz slivers, specularite, bones, glass, Iron Age potshreds and 19th century porcelain.

=== Mmasechele Cave ===
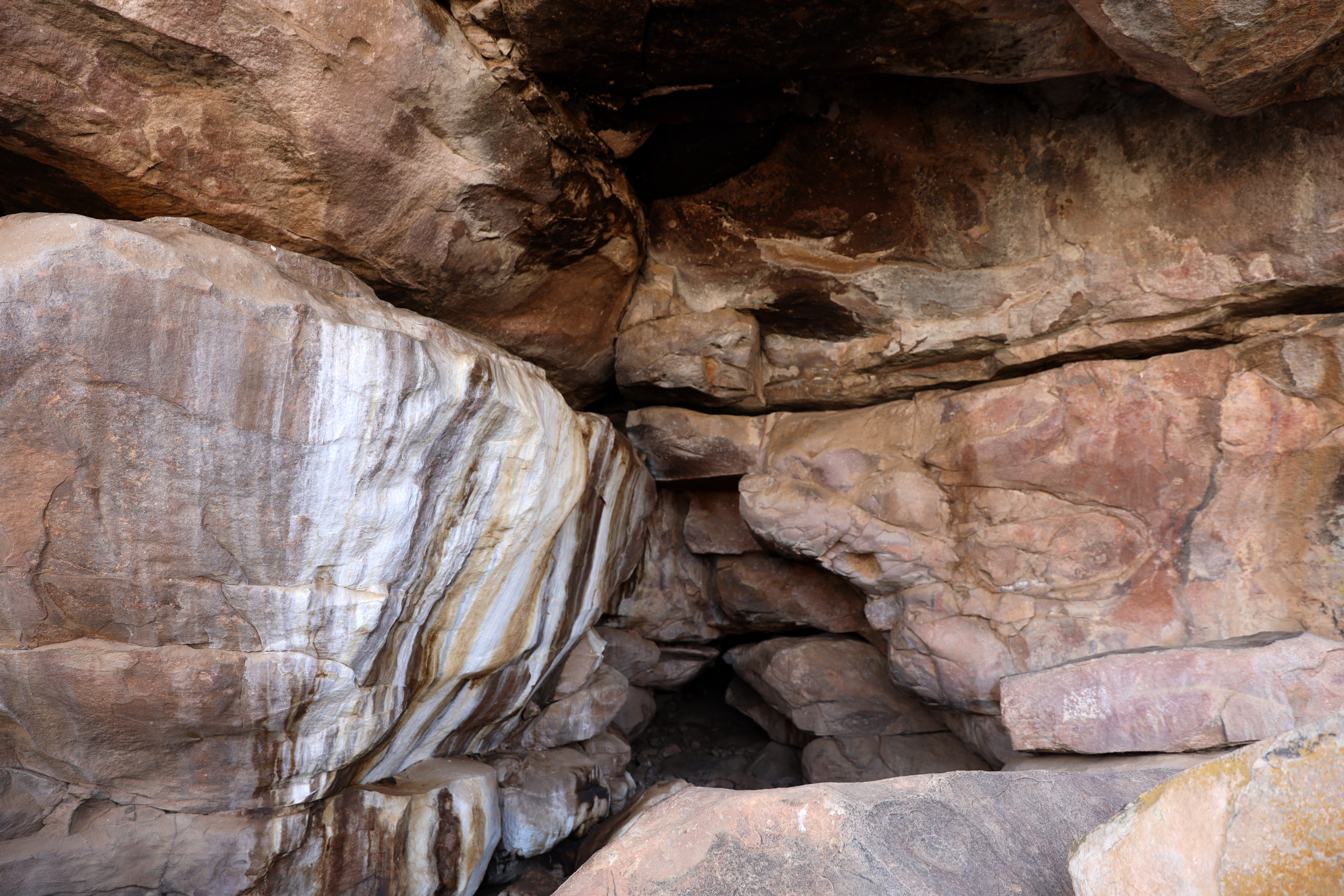
Mmasechele Cave

In 1852, a group of four Batswana tribes, led by Sechele I, Kgosi (chief) of the Bakwena tribe, fought against the Boers in the Battle of Dimawe. There was an attempt to refuge and relocate the women and children in the area. The third wife of Sechele fled and hid in the Mmasechele cave. There are no historical records regarding how long the women took shelter for but she managed to survive until the war ended in 1853.

== Gallery ==
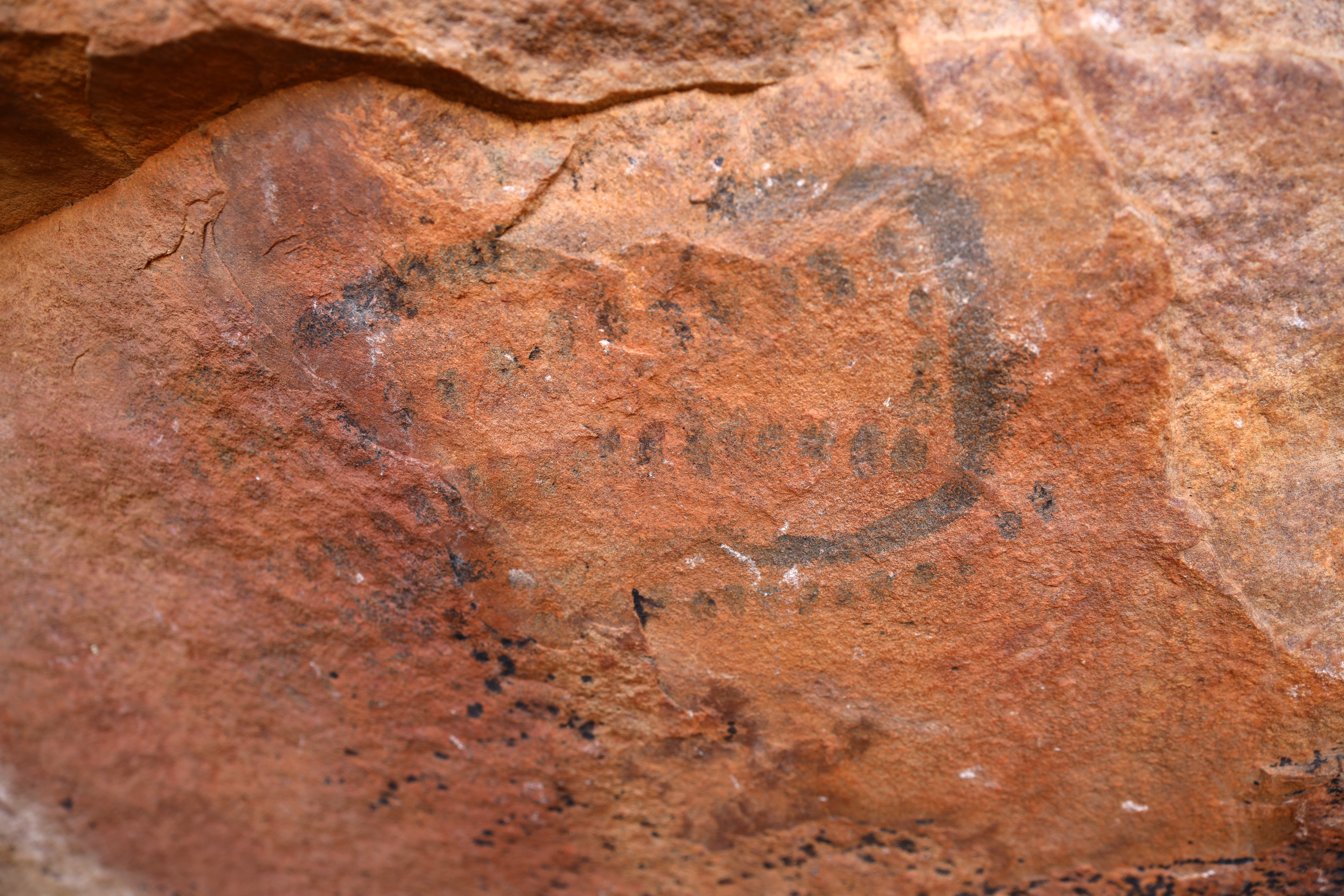
A black rectangular enclosure with rows of dots

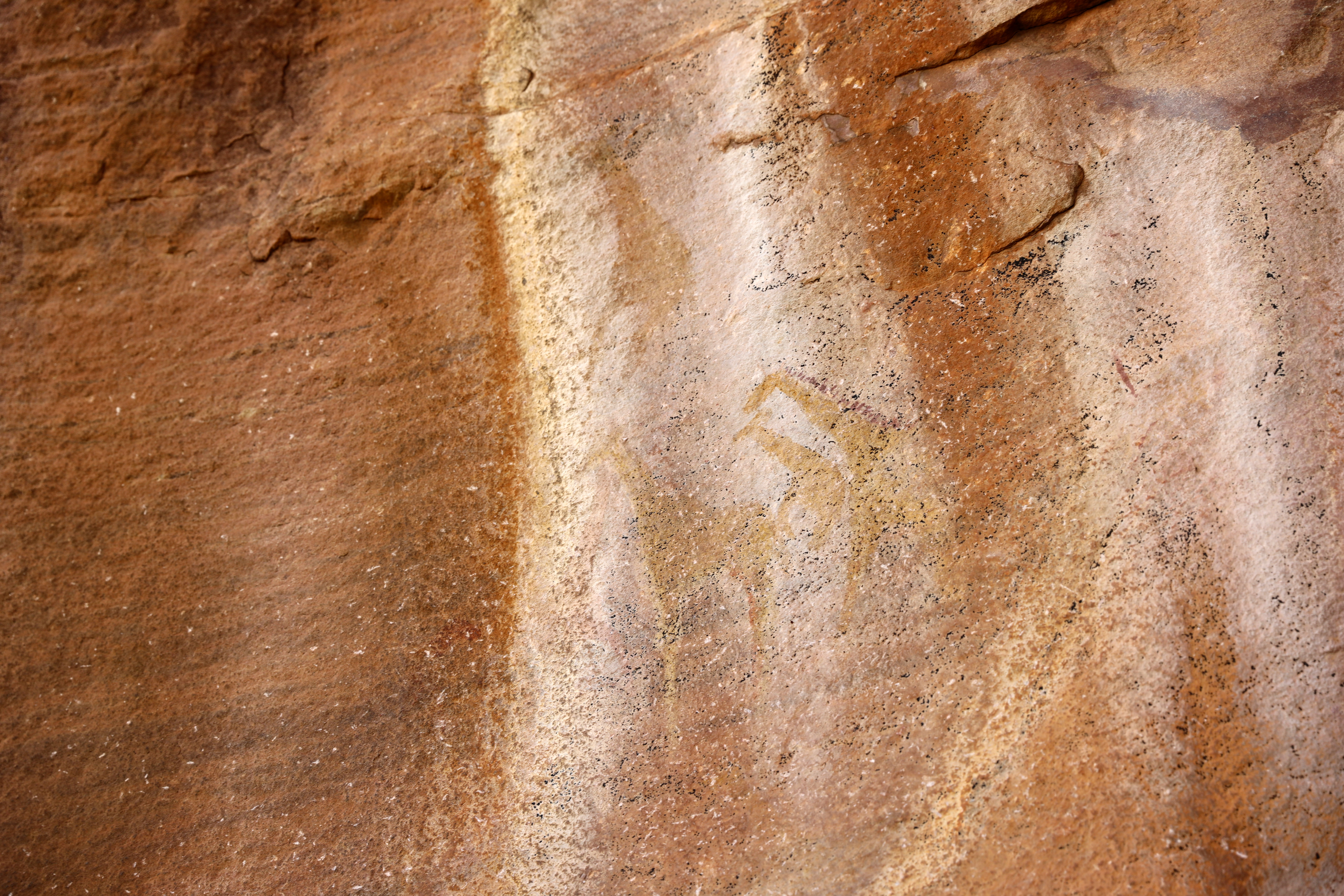
Four yellow giraffes, situated 2.4 to 3.0 meters above the ground. These are the highest and clearest of the Manyana paintings.

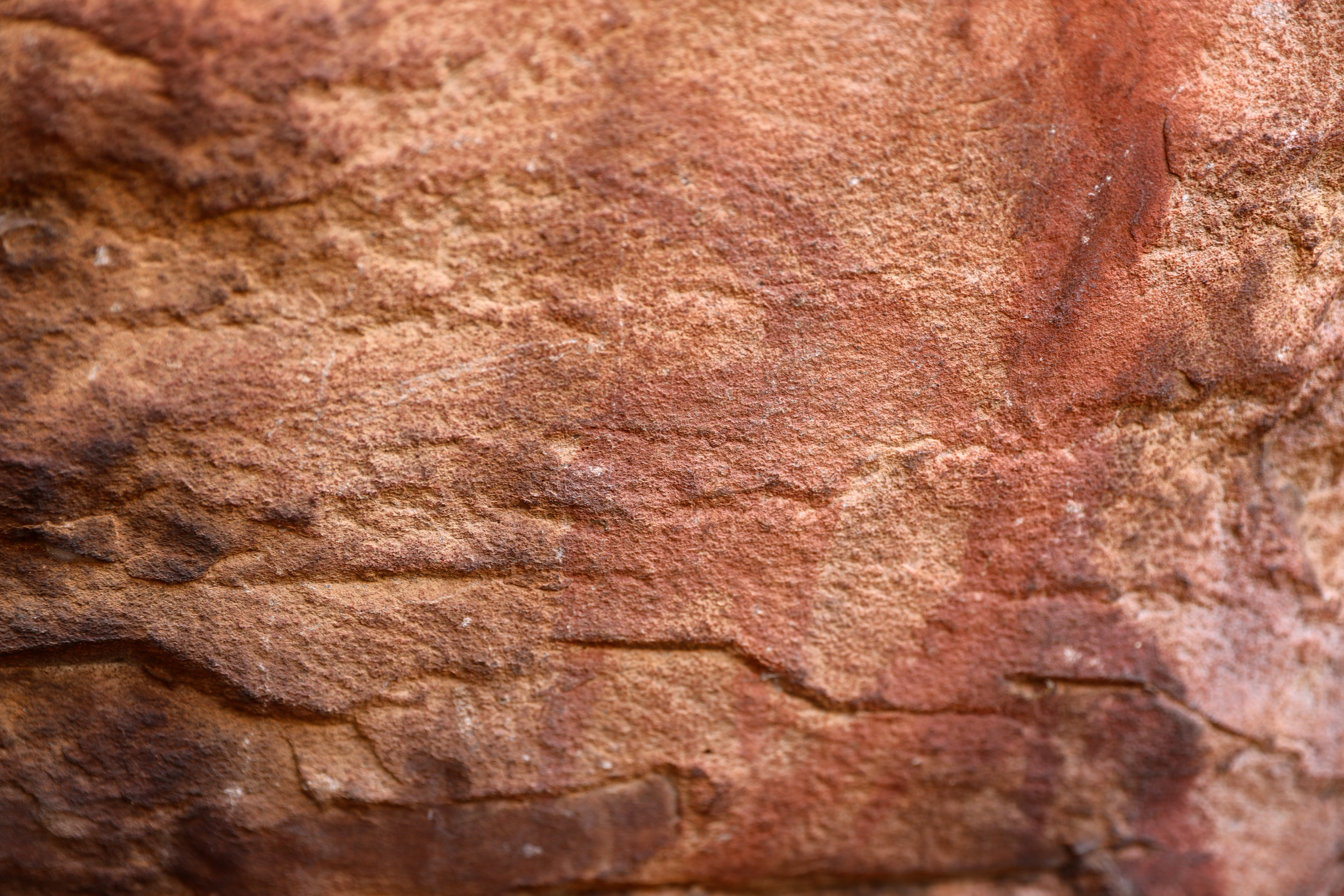
A red gemsbok

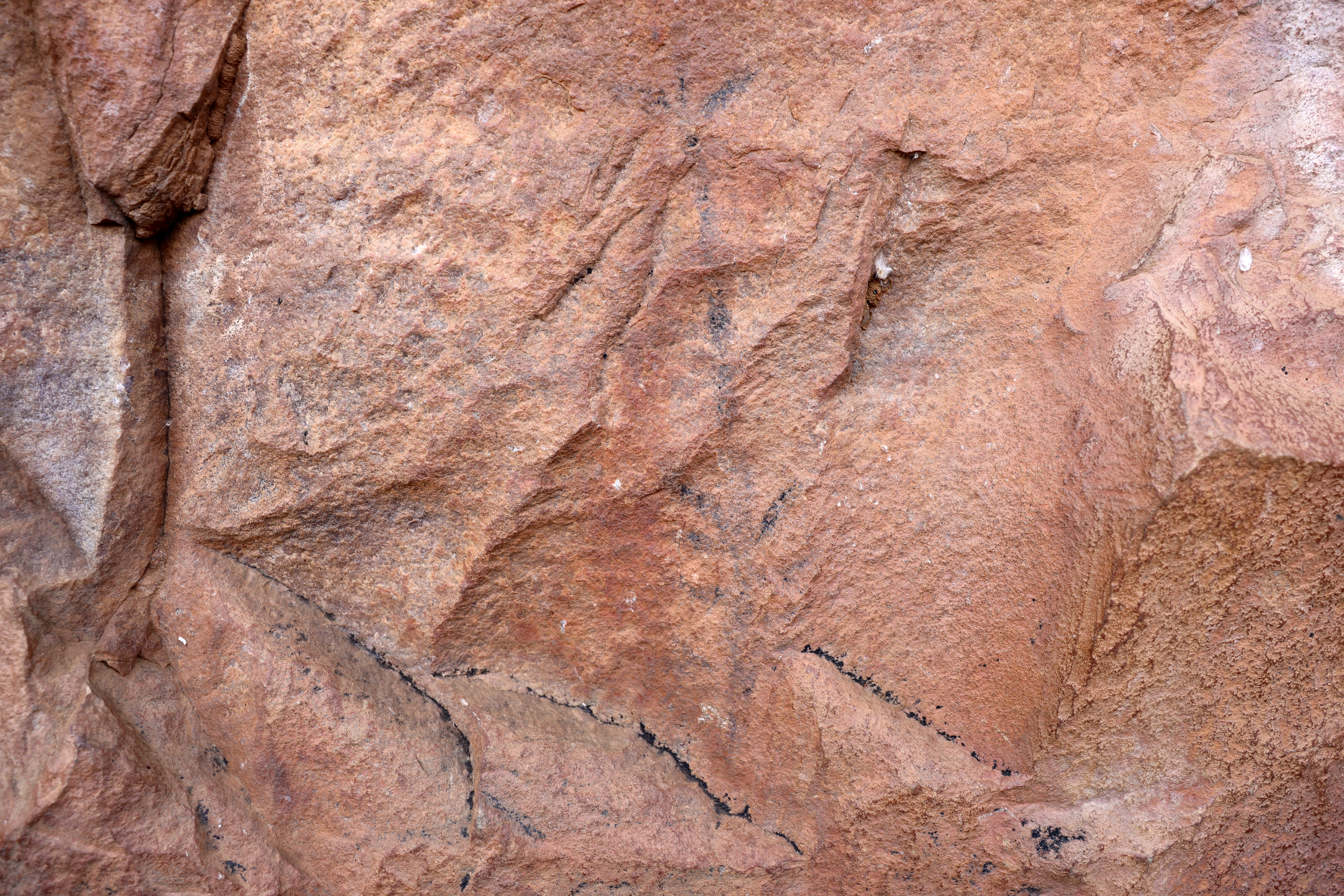
A black, medicinal herb

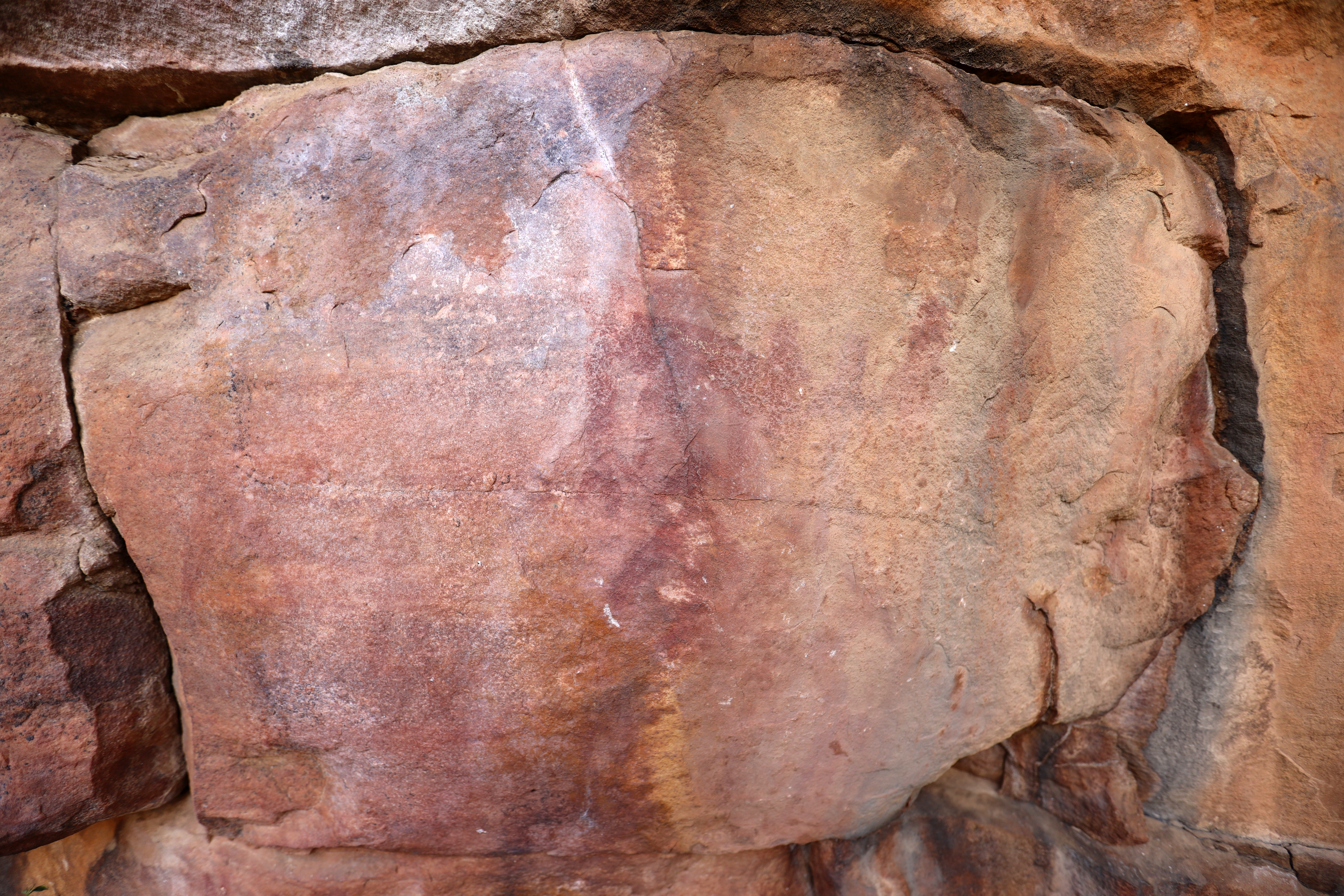
Three men carrying a prey on their back

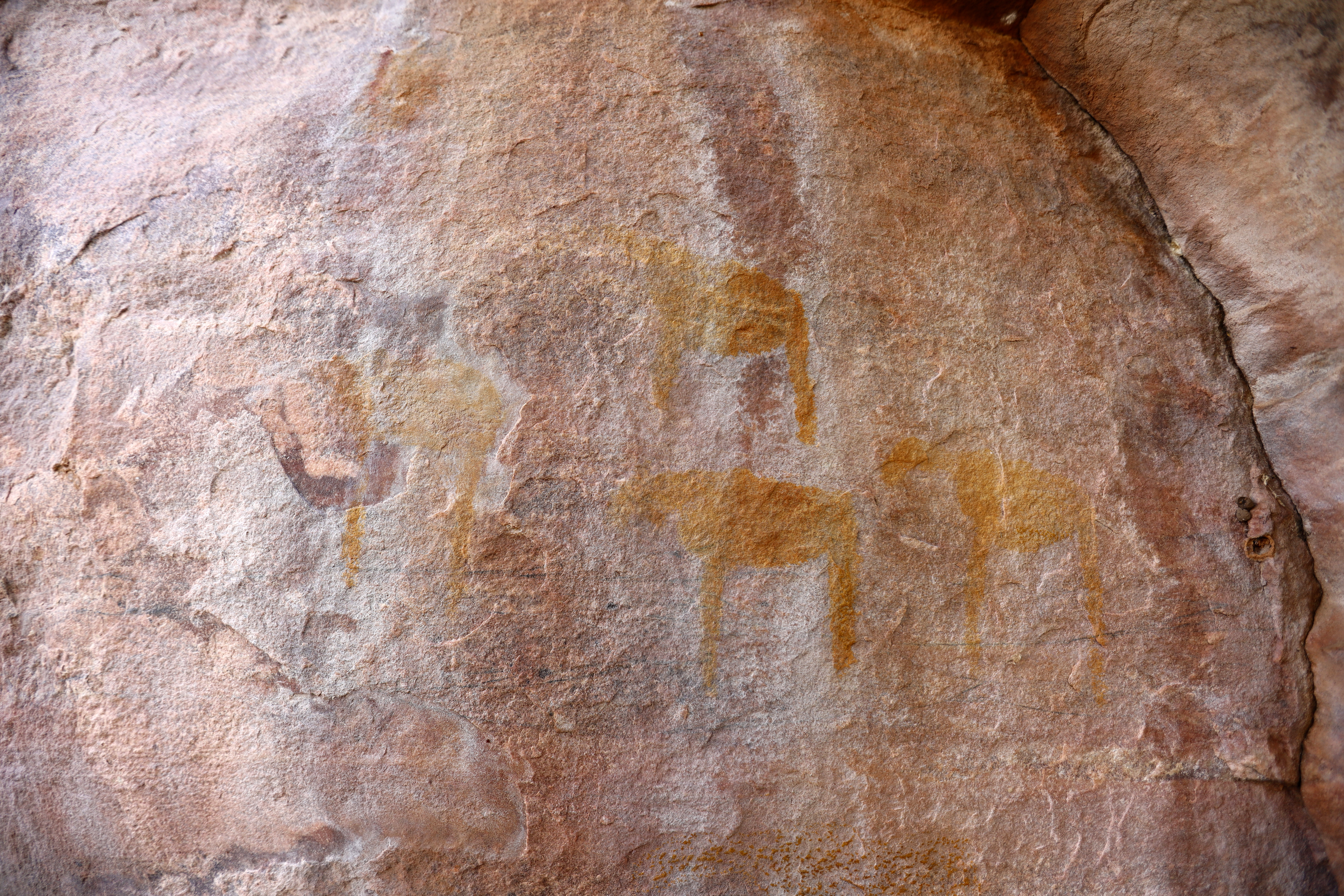
One giraffe and three kudus. The giraffe is situated at the top center

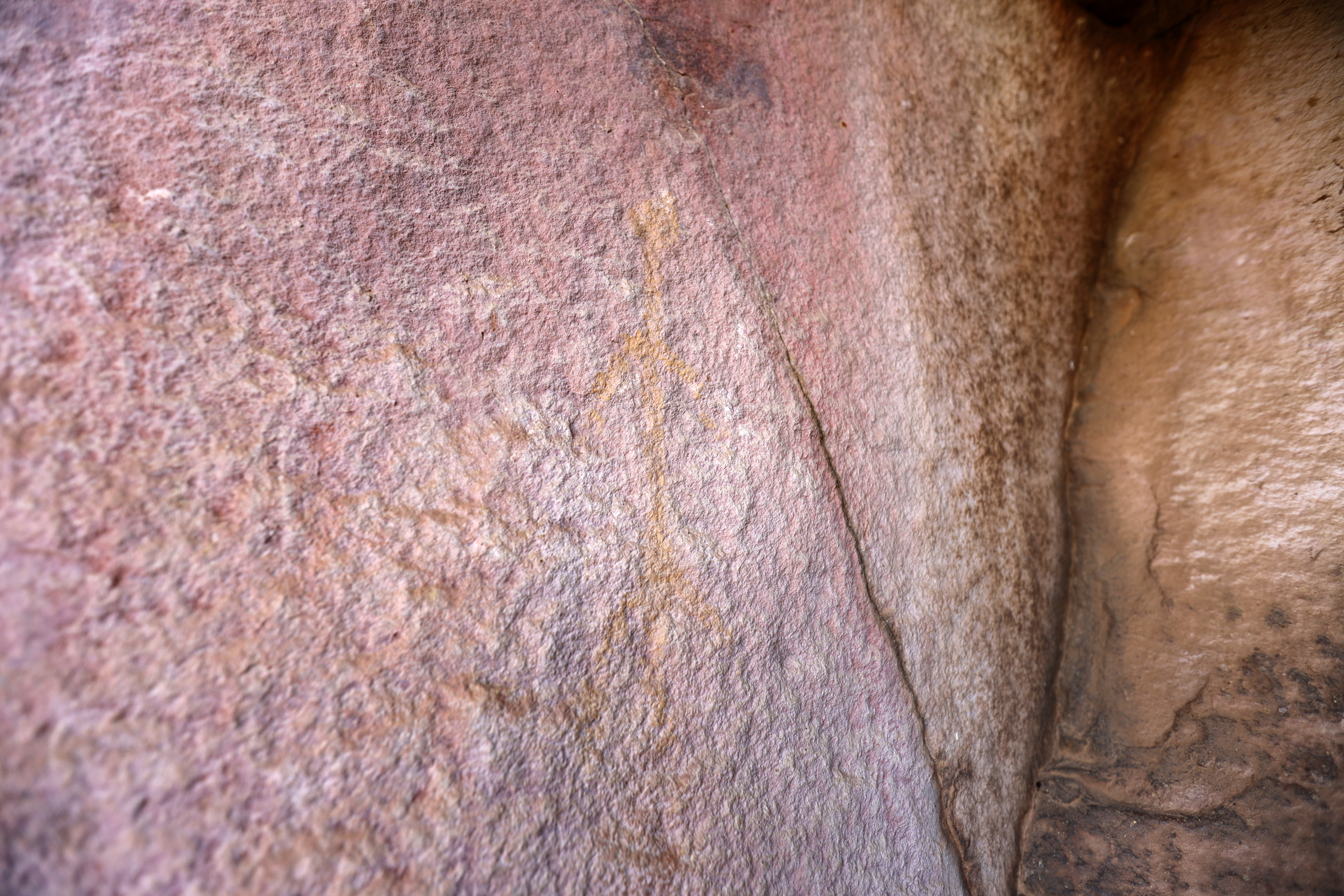
A man

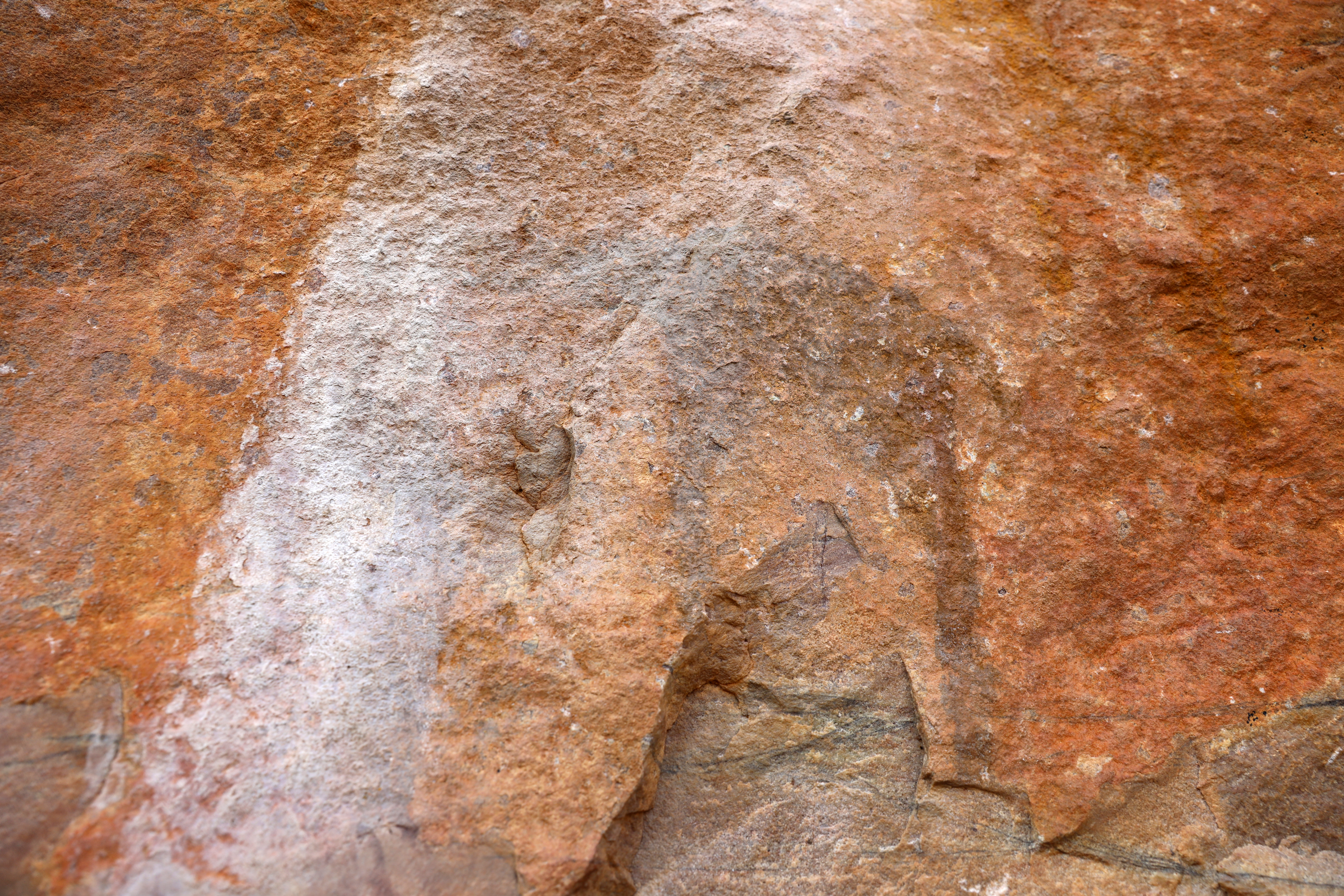
A rhinoceros facing the left

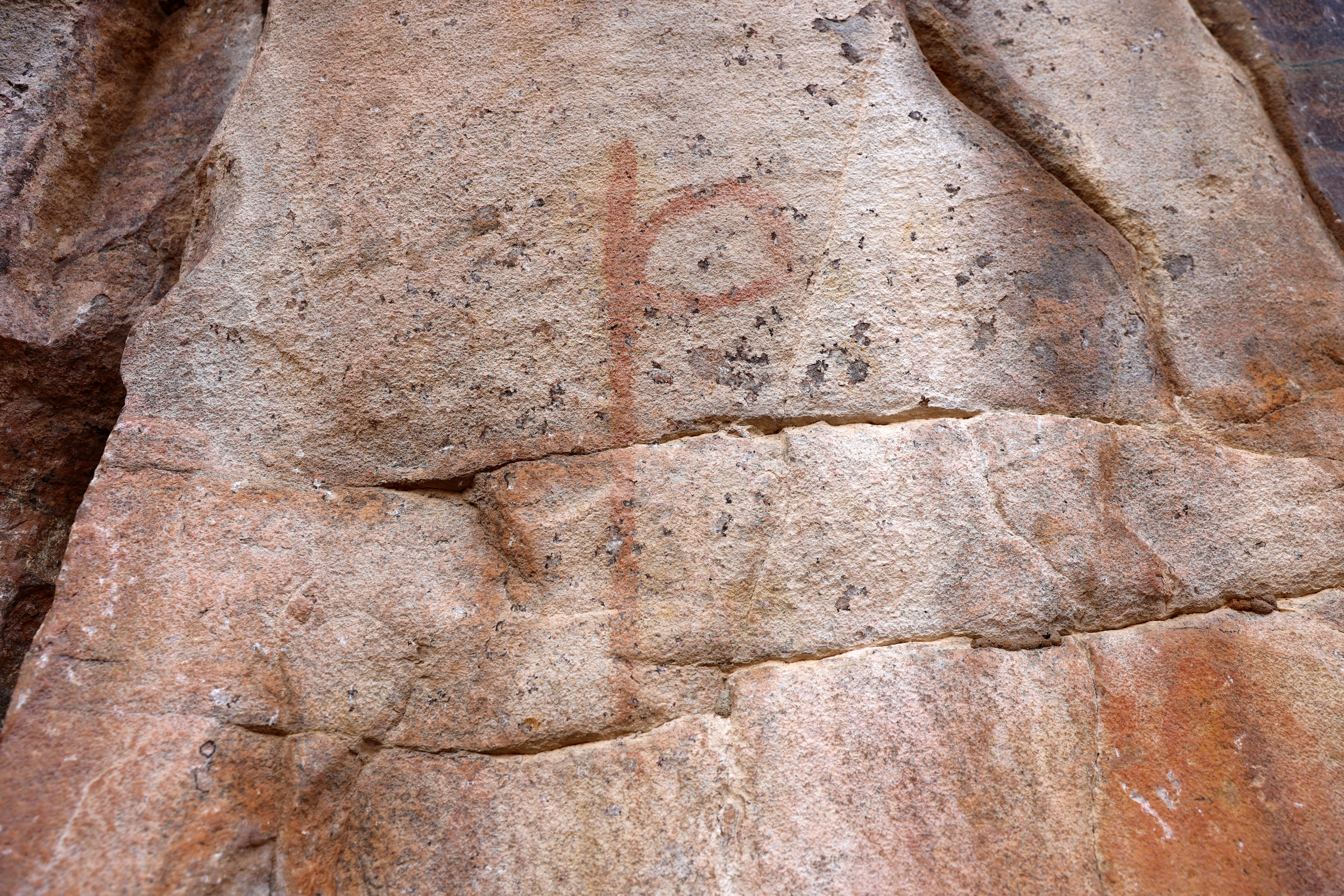
What looks like the letter "p" is believed to be the symbol of venomous snakes

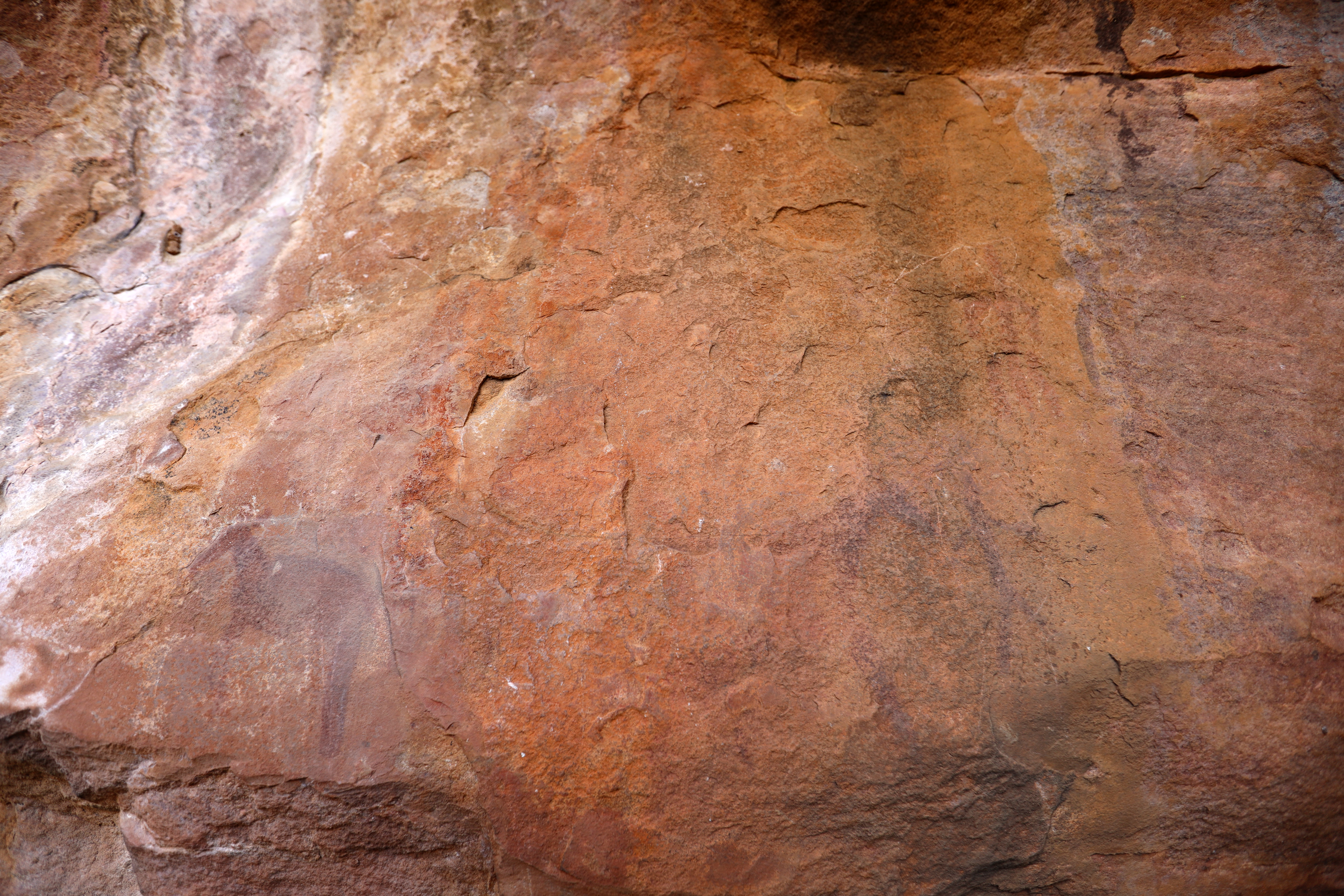
Two men, a woman (right) and a kudu (bottom left)

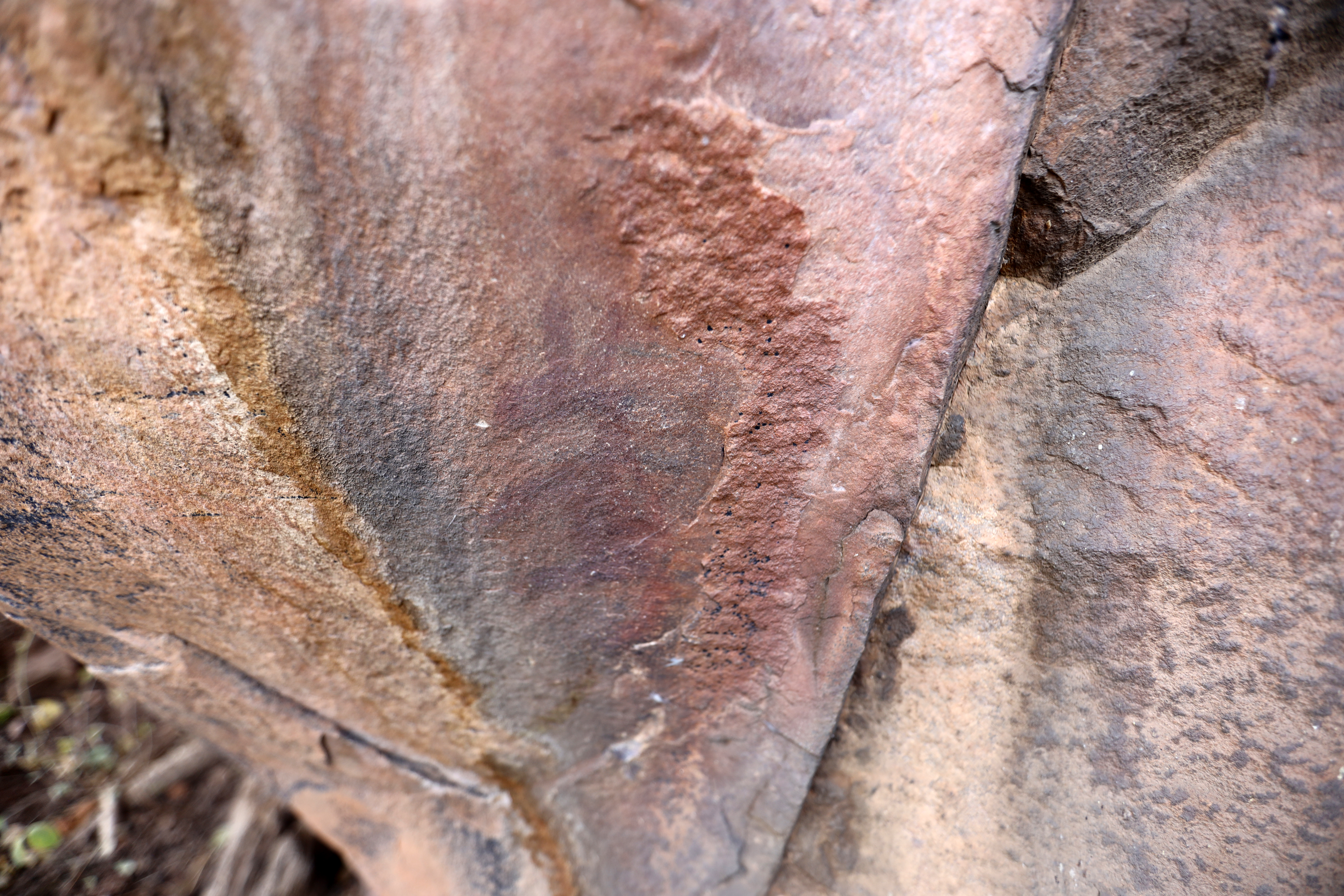
A zebra standing upright
