= Lotlhakane =

- Village
- Location within Botswana
- Coordinates: 25°05′10″S 25°27′31″E
- Country: Botswana
- District: Southern District

Government

Population (2011)
  - Total: 4,828
- Time zone: GMT +2
- Climate: BSh

Lotlhakane is a large village located in the Southern District of Botswana. It had 4,828 inhabitants at the 2011 census.

== See also ==
- List of cities in Botswana
