= Tonota (Botswana constituency) =

Parliamentary constituency in Botswana, 1965 onwards

- Single-member constituency for the National Assembly
- District: Central District
- Population: 42,330
- Major settlements: Tonota
- Area: 3,494 km^{2}

Current constituency
- Created: 1965
- Party: UDC
- Created from: Tonota North; Tonota South
- Abolished: 1999
- Re-established: 2014
- MP: Gaefele Sedombo
- Margin of victory: 2,509 (17.2 pp)

Tonota is a constituency in Botswana represented in the National Assembly of Botswana since 2024 by Gaefele Sedombo, a UDC MP.

== Constituency profile ==
The seat was a stronghold for the Botswana Democratic Party (BDP), consistently supporting it from its establishment in 1965 until its abolition after the 1999 elections. The constituency was re-established ahead of the 2014 elections and the BDP notionally held the seat. However, in the 2019 election, the Umbrella for Democratic Change (UDC) won the seat, marking the first time an opposition party had secured victory in the seat and its predecessors, Tonota South and Tonota North. This win aligned with the broader success the UDC achieved in the northern parts of Botswana during the 2019 election.

The predominantly rural constituency encompasses the following localities:

1. Tonota
2. Serule
3. Mandunyane
4. Borotsi
5. Foley
6. Gojwane
7. Sese
8. Makomoto

== Members of Parliament ==
Key: BDP UDC

Election	Winner
1965 election	Lemme Makgekgenene
1969 election	Lemme Makgekgenene
1974 election	Lemme Makgekgenene
1979 election	Lemme Makgekgenene
1984 election	Lemme Makgekgenene
1989 election	Lemme Makgekgenene
1994 election	Lemme Makgekgenene
1999 election	Lemme Makgekgenene
2014 election	Thapelo Olopeng
2019 election	Pono Moatlhodi
2024 election	Gaefele Sedombo

== Election results ==
=== 2024 election ===
General election 2024: Tonota
Party	Candidate	Votes	%	±%
UDC	Gaefele Sedombo	7,024	48.20	−7.80
BDP	Andy Boatile	4,515	30.98	−15.02
BPF	Losika Keatlholetswe	1,814	12.45	N/A
BCP	Themba Joina	990	6.79	N/A
Independent	Edward Odireleng	230	1.58	N/A
Margin of victory		2,509	17.22	+9.22
Total valid votes		14,573	99.10	−0.29
Rejected ballots		132	0.90	+0.29
Turnout		14,705	82.76	−2.10
Registered electors		17,768		
UDC hold		Swing	−3.61	

=== 2019 election ===
General election 2019: Tonota
Party	Candidate	Votes	%	±%
UDC	Pono Moatlhodi	8,364	54.00	+13.52
BDP	Thapelo Olopeng	7,125	46.00	−8.81
Margin of victory		1,239	8.00	N/A
Total valid votes		15,489	99.39	+0.23
Rejected ballots		95	0.61	−0.23
Turnout		15,584	84.86	+1.59
Registered electors		18,364		
UDC gain from BDP		Swing	+11.17	

=== 2014 election ===
General election 2014: Tonota
Party	Candidate	Votes	%
BDP	Thapelo Olopeng	7,013	54.81
UDC	Pono Moatlhodi	5,179	40.48
BCP	Themba Joina	475	3.71
Independent	Michael K. Mzwinila	128	1.00
Margin of victory		1,834	14.33
Total valid votes		12,795	99.16
Rejected ballots		108	0.84
Turnout		12,903	83.27
Registered electors		15,495	
BDP notional hold			

=== 1999 election ===
General election 1999: Tonota
Party	Candidate	Votes	%	±%
BDP	Pono Moatlhodi	4,724	69.94	+3.38
BNF	J. Montsho	1,035	15.32	–3.68
BCP	W. B. Marobela	561	8.31	New
BAM	C. Phillime	434	6.43	New
Margin of victory		3,689	54.62	+7.96
Total valid votes		6,754	94.00	N/A
Rejected ballots		431	6.00	N/A
Turnout		7,185	71.19	+2.00
Registered electors		10,093		
BDP hold		Swing	+3.53	

=== 1994 election ===
General election 1994: Tonota
Party	Candidate	Votes	%	±%
BDP	Lemme Makgekgenene	4,542	66.56	–4.66
BNF	M. Mogapi	1,358	19.00	+1.47
BPP	S. D. Sefume	924	14.44	+3.19
Margin of victory		3,184	46.66	–7.23
Turnout		6,824	69.19	+2.48
Registered electors		9,862		
BDP hold		Swing	–1.60	

=== 1989 election ===
General election 1989: Tonota
Party	Candidate	Votes	%	±%
BDP	Lemme Makgekgenene	5,404	71.22	–3.41
BNF	Willie Gulubane	1,330	17.53	New
BPP	Bonno Pone	854	11.25	–14.12
Margin of victory		4,074	53.89	+4.43
Turnout		7,588	66.71	–7.75
Registered electors		11,374		
BDP hold		Swing	+7.06	

=== 1984 election ===
General election 1984: Tonota
Party	Candidate	Votes	%	±%
BDP	Lemme Makgekgenene	5,188	74.63	–3.77
BPP	Bonno Pone	1,764	25.37	+3.77
Margin of victory		3,424	49.26	–7.54
Turnout		6,952	74.46	+6.70
Registered electors		9,336		
BDP hold		Swing	–3.77	

=== 1979 election ===
General election 1979: Tonota
Party	Candidate	Votes	%	±%
BDP	Lemme Makgekgenene	3,292	78.40	–1.77
BPP	J. Modise	907	21.60	+1.77
Margin of victory		2,385	56.80	–3.54
Turnout		7,006	67.76	+29.64
Registered electors		10,340		
BDP hold		Swing	–1.77	

=== 1974 election ===
General election 1974: Tonota
Party	Candidate	Votes	%	±%
BDP	Lemme Makgekgenene	1,261	80.17	+13.06
BPP	P.K. Pudiephatshwa	312	19.83	–7.00
Margin of victory		949	60.34	+20.06
Turnout		1,573	15.22	−32.32
Registered electors		10,333		
BDP hold		Swing	+10.03	

=== 1969 election ===
General election 1969: Tonota
Party	Candidate	Votes	%	±%
BDP	Lemme Makgekgenene	1,683	67.11	+6.26
BPP	P.P. Kgamane	673	26.83	–10.97
BNF	W. Gulubane	152	6.06	New
Margin of victory		1,010	40.28	+17.23
Turnout		1,750	47.54	–36.66
Registered electors		5,276		
BDP hold		Swing	+8.62	

=== 1965 election ===
General election 1965: Tonota
Party	Candidate	Votes	%
BDP	Lemme Makgekgenene	3,291	60.85
BPP	L.E. Senthufhe	2,044	37.80
BIP	M.N. Nwako	73	1.35
Margin of victory		1,247	23.05
Turnout		3,866	84.2
Registered electors		≈4,591	
BDP win (new seat)			
