= Ranaka =

- Village
- Location within Botswana
- Coordinates: 24°54′38.922″S 25°28′15.780″E
- Country: Botswana
- District: Southern District

Population (2012)
  - Total: 3,089
- Time zone: GMT +2
- Climate: BSh

Ranaka is a village located in the Southern District of Botswana.

It had 3,089 inhabitants in 2012.

== Settlements ==
Ranaka is divided into 14 settlements:

- Dinogeng, 114 inhabitants
- Gakgobolo, 28 inhabitants
- Kgamagadi, 4 inhabitants
- Kgokgole, 25 inhabitants
- Lohatlheng, 5 inhabitants
- Lohawe, 8 inhabitants
- Lonatong, 30 inhabitants
- Mmabokgale, 3 inhabitants
- Mmadigetwane
- Mmadinonyane, 12 inhabitants
- Momare, 28 inhabitants
- Rakgokgonyane, 20 inhabitants
- Tsitlane, 12 inhabitants
- Tsonye, 70 inhabitants

== See also ==
- List of cities in Botswana
