= Khudumelapye =

- Village
- Location in Botswana
- Coordinates: 23°55′2″S 24°57′9″E
- Country: Botswana
- District: Kweneng District

Government

Population (2001)
  - Total: 1,837

Khudumelapye or Kudumelapye is a village in Kweneng District of Botswana. It is located 30 km north-west of Letlhakeng. The population of Khudumelapye was 1,837 in 2001 census.
