= Botlhapatlou =

- Village
- Location in Botswana
- Coordinates: 24°1′31″S 25°29′28″E
- Country: Botswana
- District: Kweneng District

Population (2022)
  - Total: 1 493

Botlhapatlou or Bothapatlou is a village in Kweneng District of Botswana. The village is located 55 km north of Molepolole. The population of Botlhapatlou wase 1,493 the 2022 census.
