= Marobela =

- Village
- Location within Botswana
- Coordinates: 20°52′06″S 27°13′48″E
- Country: Botswana
- District: Central District

Population (2011)
  - Total: 1,672
- Time zone: GMT +2
- Climate: BSh

Marobela is a village located in the Central District of Botswana. It had 1,672 inhabitants at the 2011 census.

== Settlements ==
Marobela is divided into 3 settlements:

- Mafongo Lands, 107 inhabitants
- Matapdza, 18 inhabitants
- Ntala, 109 inhabitants

== See also ==
- List of cities in Botswana
