= Manyana, Botswana =

Manyana Goo-Ntsho
- Village
- Location within Botswana
- Coordinates: 24°46′25.308″S 25°35′34.296″E
- Country: Botswana
- District: Southern District

Population (2011)
  - Total: 3,550
- Time zone: GMT +2
- Climate: BSh

Manyana is a village located in the Southern District of Botswana. It had 3,550 inhabitants at the 2011 census.

== Settlements ==
Manyana is divided into 16 settlements:

- Bikwane
- Bikwe, 232 inhabitants
- Boswelakgosi, 1 inhabitant
- Dialane, 19 inhabitants
- Fikeng, 8 inhabitants
- Lekgorapana
- Makokwe, 12 inhabitants
- Manyelanong, 30 inhabitants
- Matshai
- Mokata
- Phogotlhwe, 7 inhabitants
- Ramating, 1 inhabitant
- Ratlhogwana, 20 inhabitants
- Sekgweng
- Serowe, 1 inhabitant
- Thakadiawa, 4 inhabitants

== See also ==
- List of cities in Botswana
