= Sorilatholo =

- Village
- Location in Botswana
- Coordinates: 23°38′12″S 24°57′55″E
- Country: Botswana
- District: Kweneng District

Population (2001)
  - Total: 472

Sorilatholo is a village in Kweneng District of Botswana. The village is located in Kalahari Desert, around 180 km north-west of Gaborone, and it has a primary school. The population was 472 in 2001 census.
