= Lecheng, Botswana =

Lecheng
- Village
- Location within Botswana
- Coordinates: 22°39′55″S 27°13′12″E
- Country: Botswana
- District: Central District

Population (2011)
  - Total: 3,334
- Time zone: GMT +2
- Climate: BSh

Lecheng is a village located in the Central District of Botswana, about 20 km east of Palapye at the start of the western part of the mighty Tswapong Hills. It had 3,334 inhabitants at the 2011 census.

== See also ==
- List of cities in Botswana
