= Ditshegwane =

- Village
- Location in Botswana
- Coordinates: 24°10′0″S 24°57′42″E
- Country: Botswana
- District: Kweneng District

Population (2001)
  - Total: 1,766

Ditshegwane is a village in Kweneng District of Botswana. It is located 15 km south-west of Letlhakeng. The population of Ditshegwane was 1,766 in 2001 census.
