= Ngware =

- Village
- Location in Botswana
- Coordinates: 23°51′56″S 25°22′6″E
- Country: Botswana
- District: Kweneng District

Population (2022)
  - Total: 1 124

Ngware is a village in Kweneng District of Botswana. It is located 42 kilometers north-east of Letlhakeng. The population of Ngware was 1 124 in 2022, according to Population and Housing Census 2022 Population of Cities and Towns.

Ngware is located 125 kilometers northwest of Botswana's capital city, Gaborone, and 75 kilometers north of Molepolole, along the Molepolole- Lephepe road branch from Hatsalatladi westward through Botlhapatlou on gravel road into the valley-shaped village of Ngware (37 kilometers from Hatsalatladi). Ngware is 42 kilometres north-east of Letlhakeng by an alternate road. Before Letlhakeng was designated as a sub-district, Ngware's headquarters were at Molepolole. Ngware is strategically placed between three major villages: Botlhapatlou, which is 18 kilometers away, Malwelwe, which is 20 kilometers away, and Diphuduhudu, which is 16 kilometers north of Ngware. The community is home to two major agricultural establishments: the Ramoalosi Artificial Insemination Ranch and the Matlolakgang Agricultural Research Centre, both of which have had a good economic and agricultural impact on the people' livelihoods.

The historical image of Ngware Village

Ngware is part of the Bakwena domain and is located in the Kgalagadi basin. Through ancestry or kinship, the people of Ngware are related to the Bakwena, Bakgalagadi, and Basarwa. From the 1700s to the 1900s, Bakwena from Molepolole grazed their animals and ploughed in Ngware, which eventually became a village after the village leadership settled from Mmamonageng and Dinonyane farms.

Education and Health

Prior to the 1980s, people of Ngware had to travel 75 kilometres to Molepolole for health care. In the 1990s, the Botswana government erected a modest Health Post in Ngware, which was responsible for providing primary health care, such as child immunisation, vaccination, extra feeding for toddlers, and prescription administration to out-patients. The health post had a general nurse and an auxiliary officer who were in charge of carrying out the above mandate. The health post was renovated to a full clinic in 1998, including a maternity room, consultation rooms, dispensary, storerooms, and a caravan used for HIV/AIDS counselling, as well as a guard room and garden. With the help of the Village Health Committee, Green Scorpion, and other minor Committees that promote community involvement activities, the staff establishment grew from three officers to over five.

The rise of HIV/AIDS cases in the community has a significant impact on health-care services such as privacy and confidentiality. HIV/AIDS patients visited Scottish Livingstone Hospital in Molepolole for exams and counselling. It was an expensive and exhausting excursion that required patients to travel 75km, 37km of which was tarred road, jeopardizing their health. The radius from Ngware to Molepolole prevented patients access to health care, resulting in greater noncompliance and, in some cases, death. As a result, parents, breadwinners, orphans, and vulnerable children were lost.

Notable Leaders and their Contributions to Ngware Village Development

Sekate Simane's Contribution to Ngware's development

Former President Festus Gontenyane Mogae bestowed the Presidential Order of Meritorious Service in Exceptional Service to Botswana on Mr. Simane Sekate in 2007. Mr. Sekate is a Ngware resident who worked tirelessly to construct Ngware Primary School from the late 1970s to the 1990s. Mr. Simane also collected and delivered mail from Molepolole to Ngware, Mmamonageng, and Dinonyane, either barefoot or on horse or donkey back. He also worked with officers from the Bechuanaland Police Force and the Botswana Police Force.

Selatlho's Contribution to Ngware's development

Selatlho's finest sons include Phaladi, Kelelekilwe (the father of Motlhanka and Koontse), and Phiri (Gothatamang and Ontatlhile Justin Selatlho, among others). Ramhata (the father to Gobenamang), Moterebe (the father to Sebokos, Nnoge, Thupe) grew up and stayed in the greater Ngware area of Masasabego, Dinonyane, Marapoatau, Makgotshane, Mazane, Diphuduhudu, Seitsante, Ramosetsanyana, Xolo and major parts of Selepesekae in the early 1900s across the years of 1980s. They recreated the current Ngware that survived the relocation, which was ordered by Kelelekilwe and cronies (Koontse, Motlhanka, and Phiri) in the early 1970s to ask the settlers in Ngware and Ngwarenyana to relocate the hamlet to Mmamonageng.

Selatlho's oldest son was not delighted by his younger siblings' transfer plan, particularly Koontse, whom he cursed for getting lost on his route to Ngware and Ngwarenyana. Because of Phaladi's magician and natural skills, Koontse and his fellow travellers became lost on their journey. After trekking over 15 kilometres the next day, they encountered a strong resistance from Kobelwane and his sons, particularly Sekanoko, who were quite wealthy at the time and controlled the settlers in Ngware and Mmamonageng. Today, we can clearly perceive a contradictory interaction between the aforementioned personalities that comprise Ngware. To this day, the Selatlho and Kobekwane families control Ngware's aristocracy.

On 10 February 2019, Ontatlhile Justin Selatlho, the then-area councilor (2014- 2019) and expert on Ngware oral history, revealed that,

"Actually, motse was supposed to go to Mmamonageng, and Phaladi was among those who refused! Ha Phiri (Rra Gothatamang), a goroga a tswa mineng, was assigned to bring his elder brother Phaladi to Mmamonageng. Phaladi o ne ka ditlhare ba timela gangwe le gape ha ba ya kwa go ene. He had his kraal (lelwapa) at Kokoruma throughout those years. Because Phaladi liked his brother, Phiri, he accompanied him to Mmamonageng for a kgotla meeting. It was decided at that meeting to "gore mmu wa Mmamonageng ga o a siamela temo. Sese le Kokoruma and Masasabego ke gone ha go tla boelwa. All three locations were close to "mogobe wa Ngware." Sese and Kokoruma were "megobe," which were magnets that drew people together in such areas. Go bo go nowa kwa Ngware, e ne e re ha megobe ye e kgadile.

I believe the migration took place between the 1940s and the 1950s. This is primarily due to the fact that sediba sa Kokoruma, Dinonyane, se phuntswe ka the late 1950s. Se biditswe Dinonyane ka gore "basimane" ba rata go tsoma dinonyane teng. Karabo e re ba ile dinonyane(ng), leina le bo le fetoga ka tsela e."

"Population And Housing Census 2022 Population of Cities and Towns" (PDF). 25 September 2023.
