= Salajwe =

- Village
- Location in Botswana
- Coordinates: 23°41′45″S 24°43′3″E
- Country: Botswana
- District: Kweneng District

Population (2001)
  - Total: 1,705

Salajwe is a village in Kweneng District of Botswana. It is located in central Botswana, in Kalahari Desert, 70 km north-west of Letlhakeng. The population of Salajwe was 1,705 in 2001 census.
