= Ramotswa station/Taung =

- Town
- Location within Botswana
- Coordinates: 24°58′41″S 25°40′42″E
- Country: Botswana
- District: South-East District

Population (2011)
  - Total: 4,250
- Time zone: GMT +2
- Climate: BSh

Ramotswa station/Taung is a town in South-East District of Botswana, southwest of the capital of Gaborone. The population was 4,250 in 2011 census.
