= Malwelwe =

- Village
- Location in Botswana
- Coordinates: 23°59′14″S 25°14′54″E
- Country: Botswana
- District: Kweneng District

Population (2001)
  - Total: 930

Malwelwe is a village in Kweneng District of Botswana. It is located 70 km northwest of Molepolole. The population was 930 in the 2001 census.
