= Mmanoko =

- Village
- Location in Botswana
- Coordinates: 24°28′41″S 25°39′56″E
- Country: Botswana
- District: Kweneng District

Population (2001)
  - Total: 763

Mmanoko is a village in Kweneng District of Botswana. It is located 31 km north-east of the capital of Botswana, Gaborone, along the Gaborone–Molepolole road. The population was 763 in 2001 census.
