= Hatsalatladi =

- Village
- Location in Botswana
- Coordinates: 24°8′6″S 25°35′22″E
- Country: Botswana
- District: Kweneng District

Population (2001)
  - Total: 609

Hatsalatladi is a village in Kweneng District of Botswana. It is located 40 km north of Molepolole. The population of Hatsalatladi was 609 as of the 2001 census.
