= Maboane =

- Village
- Location in Botswana
- Coordinates: 24°5′46″S 24°31′55″E
- Country: Botswana
- District: Kweneng District

Population (2001)
  - Total: 813

Maboane is a village in Kweneng District of Botswana. It is located 60 km north of Jwaneng and the population was 813 in 2001 census.
