= Tumasera =

Tumasera Village
- Village
- Location within Botswana
- Coordinates: 22°55′05″S 27°33′31″E
- Country: Botswana
- District: Central District

Population (2011)
  - Total: 3,136
- Time zone: GMT +2
- Climate: BSh

Tumasera is a village located in the Central District of Botswana. It had 3,136 inhabitants at the 2011 census. The village name is derived from taking first two letters of four villages of Tupsa, Malete, Seleka, and Rasesa: Tu- for Tupsa, Ma- for Malete, Se- for Seleka, and Ra- for Rasesa, together making TuMaSeRa.

== See also ==
- List of cities in Botswana
