= Pitseng, Botswana =

Coordinates: 24.6904°S 25.0454°E

Pitseng is a village in Botswana. It lies between Jwaneng and Moshupa in the Southern District. The population of Pitseng was 2250 in 2001 and it has since grown though the numbers are not available. There were 2 population censuses since 2001; 2011 and 2021.The current village chief (Kgosi) is Mmolotsinyana Mafhoko. The village has a primary school called by the name of the village. There is a main kgotla. The village is expanding quickly; there is a service center and an expanded clinic which has a maternity division. There is a hardware store and an Agrishop.
