= Oodi (village) =

- Location in Botswana
- Coordinates: 24°34′23″S 26°2′2″E
- Country: Botswana
- District: Kgatleng District

Population (2011)
  - Total: 5,687

Oodi or Odi is a village in Kgatleng District of Botswana. It is located 20 km north-east of Gaborone. The population was 5,687 in the 2011 census.
