= Pilikwe =

Town in Botswana

Coordinates: 22.7990°S 27.1938°E

Pilikwe is a rural village in Central District in Botswana. It was founded by Kgosi Tshekedi Khama of Bangwato. The current chief of the village is Kgosi Gasebalwe Seretse. The village is also known by the native name 'Rametsana'. It is located 10 km east from the Martin's Drift Tswapong highway and 32 km north-east from Radisele. The village is bordered by a hill on its northside.

Many locally known names in the national football have root there, the likes of Radipotsane, Reikeletseng, Tshelametsi and others.
