= Mogonye =

Village in Botswana

Coordinates: 24°50′S 25°43′E

- Village
- Location within Botswana

Mogonye is a village in the Southern District of Botswana. In the 2022 census, it had a population of 1,081.
