= Thabala =

Village in Botswana

Coordinates: 22°29′11″S 26°25′38″E

Location of Thabala

Thabala is a village in Central District of Botswana. The village is located 35 km west of Serowe, and it has a primary school. The population was 2,284 in 2001 census.
