= Mogorosi =

Coordinates: 22°26′12″S 26°33′56″E

Location of Mogorosi

Mogorosi is a village in Central District of Botswana. The village is located 20 km west of Serowe, it has a primary school and a C.J.S.S secondary school. The population was 2,033 in 2001 census.
