= Mabalane, Botswana =

Coordinates: 24°37′36″S 26°22′49″E

Location of Mabalane

Mabalane is a village in Kgatleng District of Botswana.

== Location ==
It is located 55 km east of Gaborone, close to the border with South Africa.

== Education ==
It has a primary school.

== Population ==
The population was 814 in 2001 census.
