= Tshimoyapula =

Village in Botswana

Coordinates: 22°7′0″S 26°55′35″E

Location of Tshimoyapula

Tshimoyapula is a village in Central District of Botswana. The village is located 45 km north-east of Serowe, and it has a primary school. The population was 1,467 in 2001 census.
