= Kachikau =

Coordinates: 18°9′26″S 24°30′00″E

Location of Kachikau

Kachikau is a village in North-West District of Botswana. It is located in the eastern part of the district, which previously formed Chobe District, and has both primary and secondary schools and a health clinic. The population was 881 in 2001 census.
