= Mabesekwa =

Coordinates: 21°18′31″S 26°52′39″E

Location of Mabesekwa

Mabesekwa is a village in Central District of Botswana. The village is located 60 km west of Francistown, and it has a primary school. The population was 886 in 2001 census.
