= Dimajwe =

Coordinates: 21°40′44″S 26°45′23″E

Location of Dimajwe

Dimajwe is a village in Central District of Botswana. The village is located 110 km south-west of Francistown, and it has a primary school. The population was 1,017 at the 2001 census, with 48% being male and 52% being female.
