= Mmaphashalala =

Coordinates: 23°38′51″S 26°49′25″E

Location of Mmaphashalala

Mmaphashalala is a village in Central District of Botswana. It is located 170 km north-east of the capital city Gaborone and 75 km south of Mahalapye, close to the border with South Africa. The village has a primary school and the population was 1,027 in 2001 census.
