= Mookane =

Village in Botswana

Coordinates: 23°41′15″S 26°39′41″E

Location of Mookane

Mookane is a village in Central District of Botswana. The village is located 150 km north-east of the capital city Gaborone, and it has primary and secondary schools, namely, Mookane Primary School and Mookane Community Junior Secondary School, and a health clinic. The following wards can be found in Mookane; Borotsi, Letswere, Mosanta and Tshipana. Mookane village is surrounded by the villages of Dibete, Mmaphashalala and Phala Road. The population was 3,283 in 2011 census.

== Sports ==
Mookane's most popular sport by participation is football. There are several football clubs in the village that participate in the annual soccer tournament organized by Mookane Natives Society every December. As of 2019, the tournament, named Koofihle Mmopi Christmas Cup (KMCC) was sponsored by Dlala Sportswear.

Some of the most notable football clubs in Mookane, past and present, are; Baviba Sporting Club, Brazil FC, Happy Stars FC, Letswere Real Masters FC, Lister City FC, Mookane United FC, Mook City Katz FC, Rhinos FC, Super Stars FC and Young Tigers FC.

== Entertainment ==
Every year on 31 December, the patrons of Mookane get together for the Annual Mookane Get Together Festival, hosted by Mookane Adventure Club. This event consists of day family friendly activities like quad bike rides, jumping castles, mixed relay races and horse races. In the evening the event turns to more adult focused entertainment activities such as battle of the Djs competition, snooker tournament, as well as live performances by various local artists and DJs.

There are several pubs in Mookane where members of the community meet on weekends for some entertainment and drinks.

The village has a community hall where the youth sometimes hold beauty contests and concerts etc.

== Economy ==
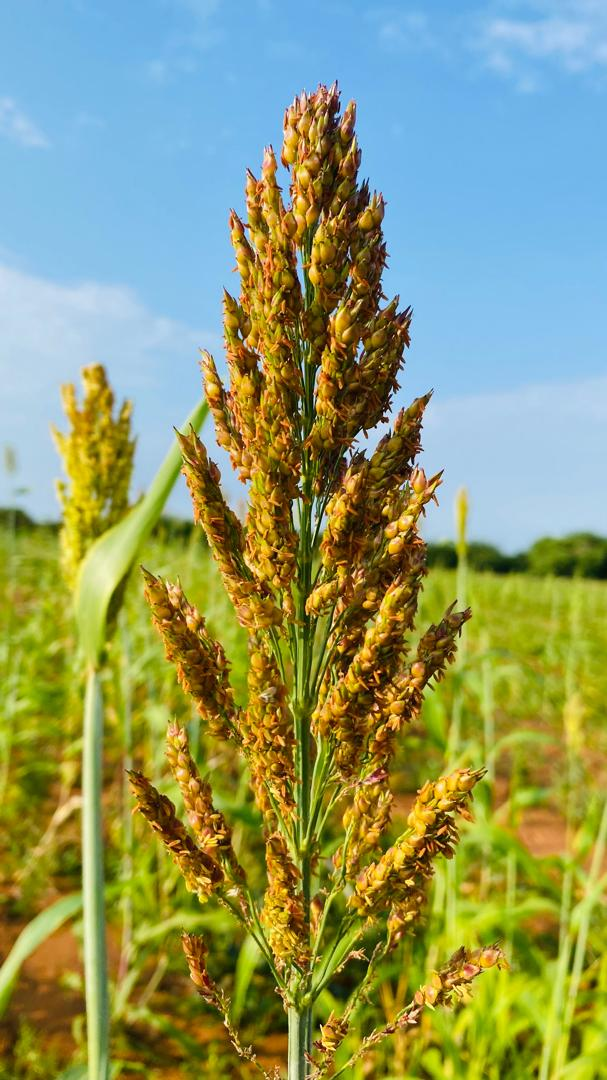
Maize at a farm in Mookane

=== Farming ===
Farming is the foundation of Mookane economy with the villagers participating in both commercial and subsistence farming. Of late, the youth of Mookane have ventured into commercial farming in large numbers. Every year around June, Mookane farmers host other farmers from all corners of Botswana at Mookane Farmers day, hosted by Letswere Brahman, TCS Charolais and 4Ts Simmentalers. The most notable events of the day include knowledge sharing amongst farmers, lectures from different field experts, as well as showcasing and selling of farm products by farmers.

=== Retail ===
Mookane community regularly have to travel to Mahalapye for shopping due to lack of retail stores in the village. They village currently have small general dealers and tuck shops for basic daily supplies. There is a small filling station which supplies Mookane people and the surrounding villages with a limited amount of petrol and diesel.
