= Radisele =

Village in Botswana

Coordinates: 22°48′30″S 26°59′58″E

Location of Radisele

Radisele is a village in Central District of Botswana. The village is located along the road connecting Palapye and Mahalapye, approximately in the middle of both villages (about 37 km from either village). The population was 2,741 in 2001 census.
