= South-East District (Botswana) =

South-East Kgaolo ya Borwa-Botlhaba
- District
- Location of South-East within Botswana
- Coordinates: 25°0′S 25°45′E
- Country: Botswana
- Capital: Ramotswa

Area
  - Total: 1,780 km^{2} (690 sq mi)

Population (2022 census)
  - Total: 111,440
  - Density: 62.6/km^{2} (162/sq mi)
- Time zone: UTC+2 (Central Africa Time)
- HDI (2023): 0.793 high · 1st

South-East is one of the districts of Botswana. The capital city of Botswana, Gaborone, is surrounded by this district. The administrative capital for the South-East district is the village of Ramotswa. In the southeast, South-East borders the North West Province of South Africa. Domestically, it borders Kgatleng in northeast, Kweneng in northwest and Southern in southwest.

As of 2022, the total population of the district was 111,440 compared to 60,623 in 2001. The growth rate of population during the decade was 3.44. The total number of workers constituted 21,810 with 11,927 males and 9,883 females, with a majority of them involved in agriculture. The district is administered by a district administration and district council which are responsible for local administration.

== History ==
=== Pre-colonization ===
During the Early Iron Age, the areas surrounding Gaborone and Otse experienced a significant transition with the arrival of agropastoralist farmers. By approximately 600 AD, these Iron Age populations settled in the area as part of the broader, gradual expansion of the Kalundu Tradition (also known as the Western Stream), which migrated from the Congo-Angolan coast across the Kalahari.

== Geography ==
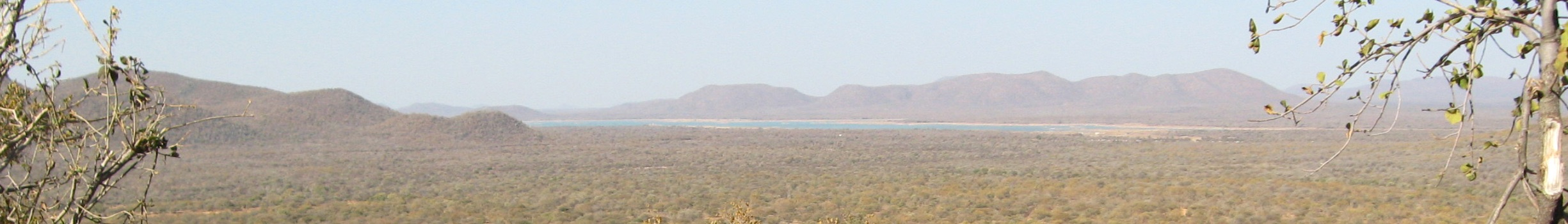
Mokolodi Game Reserve

In the southeast, South-East borders the North West Province of South Africa. Domestically, it borders Kgatleng in northeast, Kweneng in northwest and Southern in southwest. Most part of Botswana has tableland slopes sliding from east to west. The region has an average elevation of around 915 m (3,002 ft) above the mean sea level. The vegetation type is Savannah, with tall grasses, bushes and trees. The annual precipitation is around 65 cm (26 in), most of which is received during the summer season from November to May. Most of the rivers in the region are seasonal, with Limpopo River, which is prone to flash floods, being the most prominent. Mokolodi Nature Reserve, Gaborone Game Reserve and Manyelanong Game Reserve are the major tourist places in the district.

== Demographics ==
Historical population
Year	Pop.	±%
1981	30,648	—
1991	43,584	+42.2%
2001	60,623	+39.1%
2011	85,014	+40.2%
2022	111,440	+31.1%

As of 2011, the total population of the district was 85,014 compared to 60,623 in 2001. The growth rate of population during the decade was 3.44. The population in the district was 4.20 per cent of the total population in the country. The sex ratio stood at 91.83 for every 100 males, compared to 92.49 in 2001. The average house hold size was 2.51 in 2011 compared to 4.05 in 2001. There were 4,309 craft and related workers, 2,505 clerks, 5,115 people working in elementary occupation 884 Legislators, Administrators & managers 1,650 Plant & machine operators and assemblers, 1,215 professionals, 2,438 service workers, shop & market sales workers, 464 skilled agricultural & related workers 1,708 technicians and associated professionals, making the total work force to 20,481.

== Education and economy ==
As of 2011, there were a total of 67 schools in the district, with 31.70 per cent private schools. The total number of students in the Council schools was 28,479, while it was 8,383 in private schools. The total number of students enrolled in the district was 36,862: 18,387 girls and 18,475 boys. The total number of qualified teachers was 1,603, 1,303 female and 300 male. There were around 4 temporary teachers, 1 male and 5 female. There were 13 untrained teachers in the district.

As of 2006, 4,819 were involved in agriculture, 1,091 in construction, 3,182 in education, 304 in electricity and water, 356 in finance, 446 in health, 470 in hotels and restaurants, 2,674 in manufacturing, 164 in mining and quarrying, 567 in other community services, 461 in private households, 1,922 in public administration, 1,501 in real estate, 992 in transport and communications, 2,861 in wholesale and retail trade. The total number of workers was 21,810, 11,927 male and 9,883 female.

== Administration ==
Botswana gained independence from the British in 1966 and adapted the colonial administration framework to form its district administration. The policies were modified during 1970-74 to address some of the basic issues. The district is administered by a district administration and district council which are responsible for local administration. The policies for the administration are framed by the Ministry of Local Government. The major activities of the council are Tribal Administration, Remote Area Development and Local Governance. The executive powers of the council are vested on a commissioner appointed by the central government. Technical services wing of the Department of Local Government is responsible for developing roads, infrastructure in villages like water supply, schools and recreational facilities. All the staff of the local administration expect District Administration are selected via Unified Local Government Services (ULGS) and the Ministry of Local Government is responsible for their training, deployment and career development.

The sub-districts of South-East District created as a part of National Development Park of the district are Ramotswa and Tlokweng.

In the 2011 Census the following villages were listed under each sub-district:

- Ramotswa sub-district: Mogobane, Ramotswa, Ramotswa Station/Taung
- Tlokweng sub-district: Otse, Tlokweng

== See also ==
- Sub-districts of Botswana
