= Mandunyane =

- Village
- Location of Mandunyane in Botswana
- Coordinates: 21°18′53″S 27°20′56″E
- Country: Botswana
- District: Central
- Established: 1973; 53 years ago
- Founder: Kgosi Harry Mandunyane I

Mandunyane is named after Kgosi Harry Mandunyane I, who ruled since 1973 when the village was established. The village is located in the Central District of Botswana in Tonota subdistrict. It is approximately 8 km (5.0 mi) north west of Tonota and roughly 30 km (19 mi) south west of Francistown.

== History ==
Mandunyane village dates back to 1973. According to the elders, the first inhabitants of Mandunyane settled at the west of the current Shashe Dam. In the early 1970s, residents were forced to relocate to make way for construction of the dam. In 1973 residents unanimously agreed to settle at the current Mandunyane. Upon their arrival there was no proper leadership. The first man to lead them was the late Kgosi Harry Mandunyane I. After his death, Kgosi Kaisara Sebopelo reigned and in 2003 Kgosi Joshua Joel inherited the throne after the untimely death of Sebopelo. There are several ethnic groups in Mandunyane: Bazezuru who reside in Maseka ward, Bakalaka, Bakhurutshe, Amandebele, Bangwato, Basarwa in Gabaratane ward and Basampesi. Bazeuru are the most populous group.

== Geography ==
Mandunyane is surrounded by Tonota West to the south, Shashe Mooke to the west, Shashe Bridge to the north and Semotswane to the east. The village is divided into six wards: Moabi in the southwest, Kgari in the southeast, Gabaratane in the northwest, Maseka in the northeast, Makamane in the central north and Morokotso in the central south. The village is ideally sandwiched between Shashe Dam and the Tholodi River.

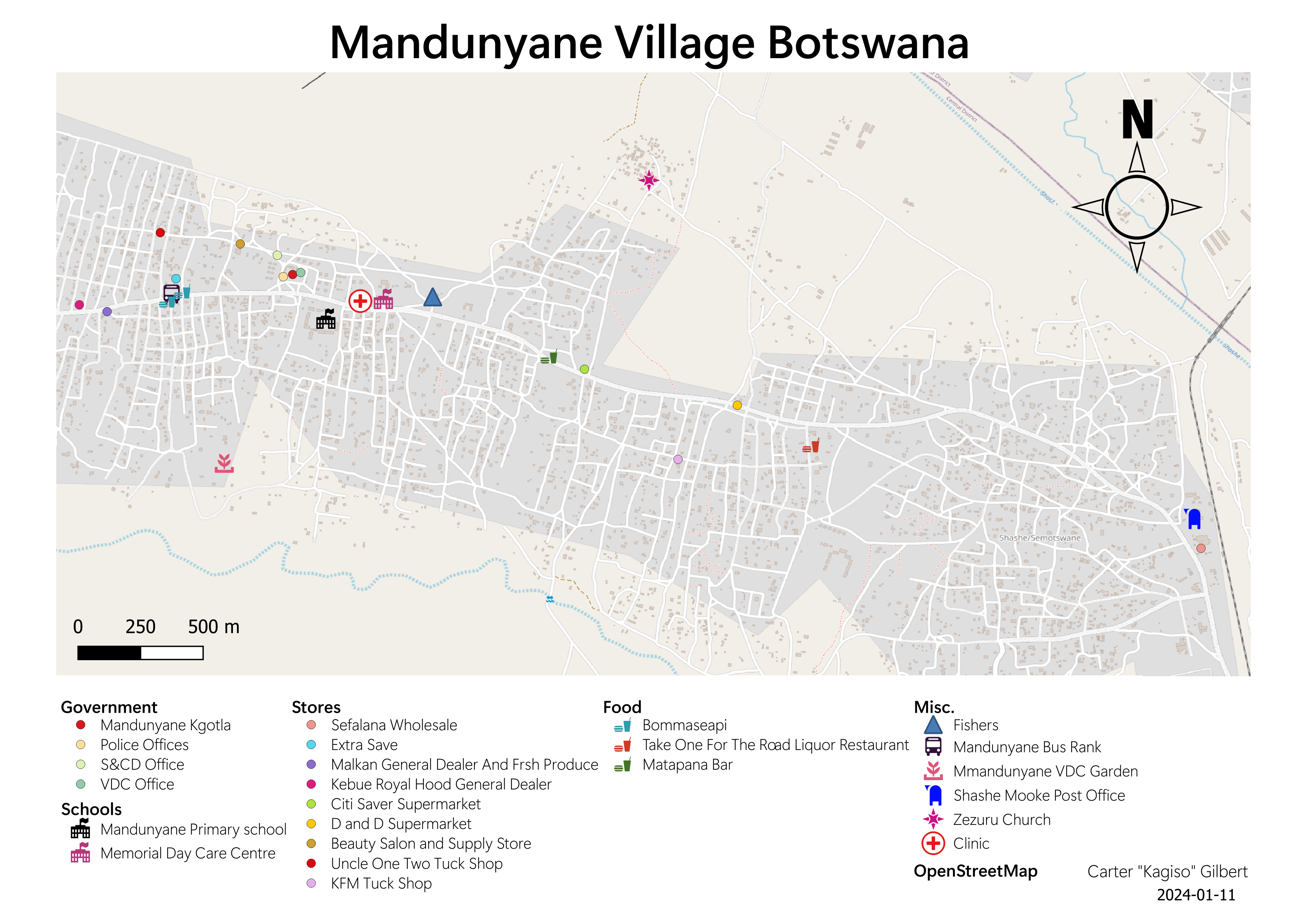
Streetview map of Mandunyane points of interest created by Carter "Kagiso" Gilbert

== Tribal administration ==
The leadership of the village consists of the chief, headman of records, Village Development Committee, a member of parliament and a councillor. Kgosi Joshua Joel is the chief and tribal leader and is responsible for general administration of the village. He is the head of the customary court and ex-officio member of the VDC. Six headmen are the chief's principal advisors. As of 2012, they were Moabi, Mooketsi, Manake, Sehedi, Kgari and Makamane. The throne of chieftainship is inherited. The rightful heir to the throne is Joel's eldest son. The Village Development Committee, elected after every two years, is responsible for village infrastructure and social welfare. It consists of ten residents. Conah Fraiser is the chairperson of the committee as of 2012. Mandunyane falls under the Tonota South political constituency. Pono Moatlhodi is the area member of parliament. Retired Brigadier Bathoen Maseko is the village councillor.

== Climate ==
Mandunyane has a semi-arid climate and most of the year offers hot days and cool nights. Average summer temperatures are 26 °C and the winters are very cold. A cool breeze flows from Shashe Dam. Rain falls from October to February.

== Demography ==
In 2001 Mandunyane had a population of 3265 with 1544 males and 2121 females. In 2011, the population grew by 6% and stood at 3800. The majority of residents are the youth who make up 54% of the population. The age structure is: 54% 0–35, 30% 35–65, and 26% are 65+. Life expectancy is 54 years. The mortality rate has decreased drastically from 70% in 2000 to 20% in 2011.

== Religion ==
95% of the inhabitants of Mandunyane are Christian, 2% are Muslim and 3% follow traditional African practices. Christian denominations include Zion Christian Church, Gospel of God Church, RARA Apostolic Church In Zion, SDAC, and New Bethel. There is one mosque in Morokotso ward.

== Economy ==
Mandunyane residents earn a living mostly through agriculture. Most of the residents have farms in the eastern part of the village. Output is mostly for family consumption, while the surplus is sold at Francistown. Residents also rear cattle, goats, sheep and poultry. Animals are also for family consumption and may be sold during tough times such as famine. Most youth are enrolled in government poverty eradication programmes such as Ipelegeng and backyard gardening. The poverty rate stands at 23.1%. Most of its residents, especially the youth, are employed at urban areas such as Francistown, Gaborone and Selibe Phikwe in manufacturing and industrial companies. Some are employed in government and parastatals.

== Education ==
Mandunyane residents attend Mandunyane Primary School for seven years and obtain a Primary School Leaving Examinations PSLE and then graduate to Tonota Junior Secondary School for three years to acquire a JCE. Those who excel continue at Shashe River School where they obtain a BGCSE/ COSC. According to a research conducted by the ministry of education and skills development in 2010, 90% of the residents have a PSLE, 88% JCE, 45% BGCSE, and 20% have a certificate, diploma and degree while 1% have MBA, MSC and PhD. Some obtain their bachelor's degrees at the University of Botswana and other overseas universities in United Kingdom, Jamaica, United States and Canada.

== Entertainment ==
Rhumba is the popular music genre in Mandunyane. Disco, traditional music and gospel are also popular. Pool and traditional chess are favourite games. Sojourners can also enjoy Shashe dam where there is swimming and fishing.

== Sports ==
Football is the famous sport. An annual tournament takes place during festive season. Football clubs include Jungle Boys FC, FC Mokwakwa, Red Sparks and Zebras amongst others. Volleyball and tennis are also played.

== Cuisine ==
The favourite meal is papa, morogo wa dinawa, chicken, rice, beef and chomolia. Traditional brews such as Morula, setopoti, khadi and Chibuku are also enjoyed.
