= Gojwane =

- Village
- Location within Botswana
- Coordinates: 21.78638636890°S 27.27716710782°E
- Country: Botswana
- District: Central District
- Time zone: UTC+2 (Central Africa Time)
  - Summer (DST): UTC+2 (not observed)

Gojwane is a rural village located in the Central District of Botswana, approximately 80km south of Francistown and 105km north of Palapye. The village receives government and social services from the Tonota District Council as a Remote Area Development Program (RADP) member. According to the Population and Housing Census 2022 (Version 2), Gojwane is home to approximately 1,888 people (916 males and 972 females). Gojwane contains a primary school, a health post, a Village Development Committee, Social and Community Development Office, Agricultural Office, and Tribal Administration.

Gojwane Primary School started at Marulamantsi cattle post in 1979 and classes were conducted under the shade of trees by volunteer teachers. The school moved to the settlement of present-day Gojwane in 1983 and was subsequently registered by the Ministry of Education in 1984. Today, Gojwane Primary School consists of twelve classrooms, two temporary classrooms and one administration block created in 2021. The primary school is a standard 1-7 government school, an institution maintained out of public funds and managed by the Ministry of Education. The school teaches approximately 464 students between the ages of six and twelve years of age and has approximately twenty teachers, a 23:1 student to teacher ratio.

Gojwane Health Post was built in 1998 and formally opened in 2000. At any given time, the clinic operates with two nurses, one midwife and two family welfare educators. The post does not have a doctor.

The Gojwane Village Development Committee (VDC) consists of 10 elected members from the community, including: the chairperson, Vice-chairperson, Secretary, Vice-Secretary, Treasurer, and five additional members as governed by the Local Government Act (Act No. 18 of 2012). Members serve a three-year term and official elections are conducted before each three-year term. This committee is responsible for all village level development.

The Social and Community Development (S&CD) Office was established in the community in 1994 and falls under the Ministry of Local Government and Rural Development. Currently, the office is led by two S&CD Officers who act as a bridge between the community and government services.

The Agricultural Office was established in 1990 and assists members of the community with their agriculture needs as well as acts a bridge between the community and government services. Farmers practice mixed farming with both livestock and horticulture. Agricultural activities include cattle rearing, small stock rearing and crop production. Gojwane has fertile soil and many community members rely on agriculture production for their livelihoods.

Tribal Administration is located adjacent to the Gojwane Kgotla and was established in 2002. Leadership consists of the Headman of Records (Kgosi in Setswana) and three Village Headmen/women. Additionally, leadership administers customary law to resolve conflicts in the community. This body works closely with political leadership, specifically the Ward Councillor and Constituency Members of Parliament. The Kgotla functions as a community space and is used for meetings, events and markets.
