= Kweneng District =

Kweneng
- District
- Location within Botswana
- Coordinates: 24°00′S 25°00′E
- Country: Botswana
- Capital: Molepolole
- Largest: Mogoditshane
- Sub-districts: List: Molepolole/Lentsweletau Letlhakeng Mogoditshane/Thamaga

Government
  - Type: District council

Area
  - Total: 35,890 km^{2} (13,860 sq mi)

Population (2022 census)
  - Total: 387,983
  - Density: 10.81/km^{2} (28.00/sq mi)
- Time zone: UTC+2 (Central Africa Time)
- HDI (2019): 0.721 high · 4th
- Website: Official website

Kweneng is one of the districts of Botswana and is the recent historical homeland of the Bakwena people, the first group in Botswana converted to Christianity by famed missionary David Livingstone. Various landmarks, including Livingstone's Cave, allude to this history. The seat of the district's government is Molepolole, Botswana's most populous village (only trailing Botswana's two cities: Gaborone and Francistown).

It borders Central District in northeast, Kgatleng District on the east, South-East District in southeast, Southern District in south, Kgalagadi District in the west, Ghanzi District in the north. The district is administered by a district administration and district council which are responsible for local administration. Manyana rock paintings in Manyana village and Kgosi Sechele I Museum are the major attractions in the district.

As of 2011, the total population of the district was 304,549 compared to 230,335 in 2001. The growth rate of population during the decade was 2.83. As of 2006, the total number of people working in Kweneng East in agricultural sector was 7,212, 4,727 male and 2,484 female, with agriculture being the major profession.

== Geography ==
Kweneng is the only district without a foreign border. It borders Central District in northeast, Kgatleng District on the east, South-East District in southeast, Southern District in south, Kgalagadi District in the west, Ghanzi District in the north. The region is traversed by the northwesterly line of equal latitude and longitude. Most part of Botswana has tableland slopes sliding from east to west. The region has an average elevation of around 915 m (3,002 ft) above the mean sea level. The vegetation type is Savannah, with tall grasses, bushes and trees. The annual precipitation is around 25 cm (9.8 in), most of which is received during the summer season from November to May. Most of the rivers in the region are seasonal, with Metsimotlhabe River, which are prone to flash floods, being the most prominent. Manyana rock paintings in Manyana village and Kgosi Sechele I Museum are the major attractions in the district.

== Demographics ==
Historical population
Year	Pop.	±%
1981	117,127	—
1991	170,437	+45.5%
2001	230,335	+35.1%
2011	304,549	+32.2%
2022	387,983	+27.4%

As of 2011, the total population of the district was 304,549 compared to 230,335 in 2001. The growth rate of population during the decade was 2.83. The population in the district was 15.04 per cent of the total population in the country. The sex ratio stood at 96.53 for every 100 males, compared to 93.90 in 2001. The average house hold size was 2.86 in 2011 compared to 4.34 in 2001. There were 11,142 craft and related workers, 4,692 clerks, 14,054 people working in elementary occupation 1,263 Legislators, Administrators & managers 6,378 Plant & machine operators and assemblers, 1,790 professionals, 7,227 service workers, shop & market sales workers, 2,988 skilled agricultural & related workers 4,125 technicians and associated professionals, making the total work force to 54,176.

== Education and economy ==
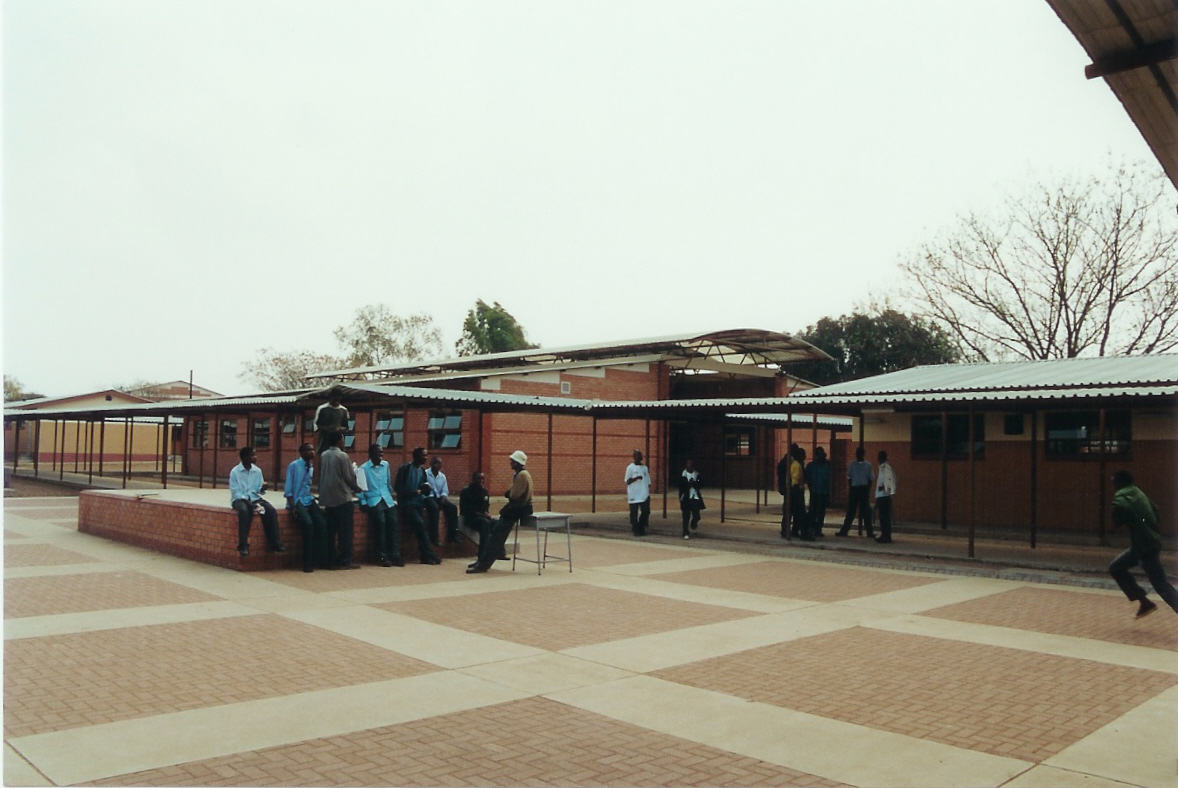
A school in the district

As of 2011, there were a total of 101 schools in the district, with 16.70 per cent private schools. The total number of students in the Council schools was 43,930 while it was 3,646 in private schools. The total number of students enrolled in the district was 47,576 constituting 23,121 girls and 24,455 boys. The total number of qualified teachers was 1,849 with 1,449 females and 400 males. There were around 094 temporary teachers, 46 male and 140 female. There were a total of 6 untrained teachers in the district.

As of 2006, the total number of people working in Kweneng East in the agricultural sector was 12,740, 7,786 male and 4,954 female. There were 3,314 people in construction industry, 4,141 in education, 178 in electricity and water, 557 in finance, 531 in foreign mission, 269 in health industry, 2,088 in hotels and restaurants, 200 in local government, 578 in manufacturing, 1,358 in mining & quarrying 2,503 in other community services, 858 in private households, 504 in public administration, 6,142 in real estate, 25,969 in transport and communication industry and 2,484 wholesale industries. The total working population was 7,212 with 706 males and 296 females.

As of 2006, the total number of people working in Kweneng East in the agricultural sector was 7,212, 4,727 male and 2,484 female. There were 1,001 people in construction industry, 164 in education, 073 in electricity and water, 073 in finance, 250 in foreign mission, 228 in health industry, 064 in hotels and restaurants, 648 in local government, 11,963 in manufacturing, 5,309 in mining & quarrying 918 in other community services, 125 in private households, 45 in public administration, 458 in real estate, 756 in transport and communication industry and 435 wholesale industries. The total working population was 756 with 184 males and 219 females.

== Administration ==
Populated places
Population	2001	2006	2011	2022
Mogoditshane	14,246	46,493	57,637	88,006
Molepolole		65,570	67,598	74,674
Thamaga		21,141	19,547	25,297
Gabane	10,399	13,581	14,842	20,010
Kopong	5,571	7,999	9,520	13,816
Metsimotlhabe				11,589
Letlhakeng	6,032		7,229	8,343

Botswana gained independence from the British in 1966 and adapted the colonial administration framework to form its district administration. The policies were modified during 1970-74 to address some of the basic issues. The district is administered by a district administration and district council which are responsible for local administration. The policies for the administration are framed by the Ministry of Local Government. The major activities of the council are Tribal Administration, Remote Area Development and Local Governance. The executive powers of the council are vested on a commissioner appointed by the central government. Technical services wing of the Department of Local Government is responsible for developing roads, infrastructure in villages like water supply, schools and recreational facilities. All the staff of the local administration expect District Administration are selected via Unified Local Government Services (ULGS) and the Ministry of Local Government is responsible for their training, deployment and career development. Kweneng District has two census districts namely Kweneng East and Kweneng West.

== See also ==
- Sub-districts of Botswana
