= Districts of Botswana =

- Districts of Botswana. The seven urban districts are not shown.
- Category: Unitary State
- Location: Republic of Botswana
- Number: 17 Districts
- Populations: 2,914 (Sowa) – 652,085 (Central District)
- Areas: 17 km^{2} (6.6 sq mi) (Orapa) – 147,730 km^{2} (57,040 sq mi) (Central District)
- Government: District government
- Subdivisions: Sub-district

Botswana is divided into ten administrative districts, two cities, and five towns. These are administered by 31 local authorities (district councils, city councils or town councils).

Administrative District	Capital	Population 2022	Area (km^{2})	Density (/km^{2})
Southern District	Kanye	221,928	28,470	7.7952
South-East District	Ramotswa	111,440	1,780	62.61
Kweneng District	Molepolole	387,983	31,100	12.475
Kgatleng District	Mochudi	121,882	7,960	15.312
Central District	Serowe	652,085	147,730	4.41403
North-East District	Masunga	69,352	5,120	13.545
Chobe District	Kasane	28,743	20,800	1.382
North-West District	Maun	198,436	109,130	1.81835
Ghanzi District	Ghanzi	56,555	117,910	0.479645
Kgalagadi District	Tsabong	58,857	105,200	0.55948

As well as the main districts, Botswana also has seven urban districts which comprise the area of cities and towns.

Urban District	Population 2022
Gaborone city	246,325
Francistown city	103,417
Lobatse town	29,772
Selebi-Phikwe town	42,488
Orapa town	8,648
Jwaneng town	18,784
Sowa town	2,914

== See also ==
- Sub-districts of Botswana
- List of districts of Botswana by Human Development Index
- ISO 3166-2:BW
- Botswana cities and districts
- Statistics Botswana Website
