= Music of Botswana =

Music and musical traditions of Botswana

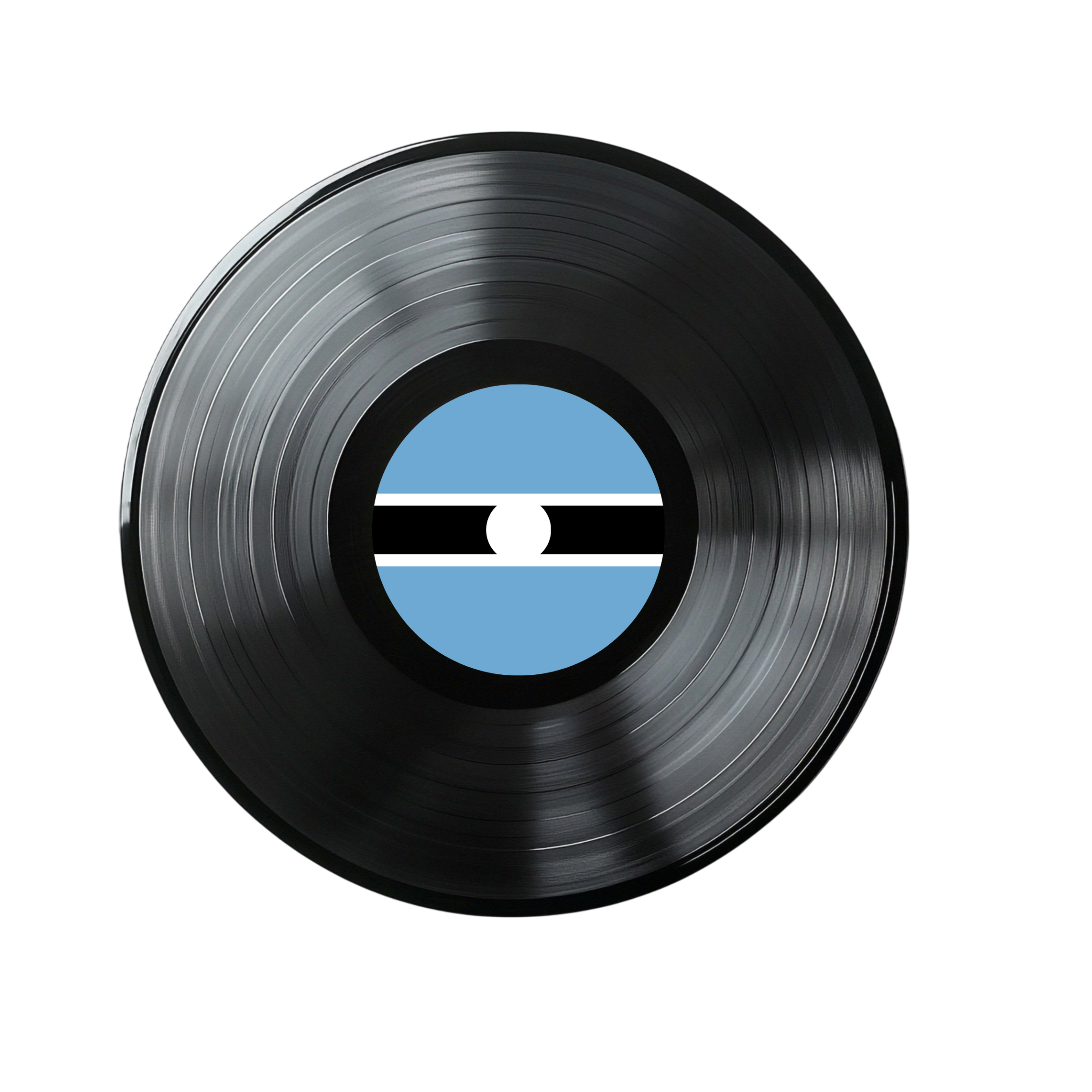
- Stylistic origins: Traditional African music, Setswana folk, kwaito, hip hop, gospel
- Cultural origins: Botswana; influences from South Africa, Central Africa, and the United States
- Typical instruments: Segankuru, setinkane, moropa, musical bow, flute, voice

Subgenres
- Motswako, kwaito kwasa, dikhwaere

Other topics
- Dance in Botswana, Culture of Botswana, Botswana Television, Yarona FM

Music of Botswana covers a broad spectrum of traditions, from the oldest surviving instruments in the archaeological record to contemporary artists whose work has reached international stages. Botswana is an African country made up of different ethnic groups, with the Batswana forming the majority of the population. Music is a large part of Botswana culture and includes popular and folk forms. Church choirs are common nationwide. The country's musical landscape reflects its history as a crossroads of southern African peoples, a British protectorate, a post-independence nation that built one of Africa's fastest-growing economies on diamond revenues, and a place where regional genres from South Africa and Central Africa have taken root alongside home-grown forms.

== Ancient and pre-colonial instruments ==
The oldest surviving instrument found in what is now Botswana is a seburuburu bullroarer made from bone, excavated from the Matlapaneng dig site and dated to approximately 1,000 years ago. A bone flute or whistle approximately 900 years old was uncovered at the Bosutswe site; it has a single opening that the player covers to vary pitch. Bone is the only material durable enough to have survived that long in the archaeological record, meaning earlier instruments almost certainly existed but have not been preserved.

Instruments were historically considered significant personal and communal property. Owners typically kept them for life, and some instruments were classified as community heritage that could not be sold without the approval of the chief. There was a religious dimension to them as well: both the materials used to make instruments and the blessings placed on them carried spiritual significance. Music was used in rainmaking rituals, in times of war, in protests against chiefly authority, and in ceremonies marking transitions in life including naming, initiation, puberty, marriage, and funerals. Doctors known as moroka ya pula burned medicines inside animal horns to produce smoke intended to bring rain.

Of the charms carried by Tswana men in the 19th century to ward off evil, one was a whistle used as an alert to danger.

== Traditional music ==
=== Tswana musical forms ===
Traditional folk songs are the most well known form of music to originate from Botswana, particularly those of the Tswana people. Traditional Tswana songs are built on a pentatonic scale and typically have a short melodic range of less than one octave. They are structured around call and response: a lead singer begins and is followed by other singers, either repeating the melody or offering a balancing response. The exchange repeats, sometimes for several minutes. As Setswana is a tone language, tonal variation carries meaning and is woven into musical performance, particularly in combination with flutes. Diatonic structures became more common as the music absorbed foreign influences over time.

Dance in Botswana is inseparable from traditional music. Traditional dances involve movement of the entire body, and many instruments require deliberate, complex movement to play properly, particularly instruments involving rattles worn on the legs or ankles. Facial expression is also considered part of the performance.

Different song types are associated with specific social contexts. Play songs use staccato sounds made through clapping or rattles. Rite of passage songs carry messages about adolescence, innocence, and chastity, with girls' songs often featuring the moropa drum. War songs traditionally incorporate a motlhatswa whistle or a lepatata horn. Healing dances, called phekolo, are still performed in contemporary Botswana, though they have migrated from the traditional kgotla space in the village centre to more private settings and use newer songs rather than historical repertoire.

Community singing is a core Batswana musical tradition, performed either in age groups or along gender lines, usually a cappella or with minimal instrumentation. Among the San and other groups, music has historically been used to imitate animal sounds including bird calls and, through bowstring technique, the sound of hoofbeats. Some Batswana women are able to ululate, a trilling sound used as a form of cheering.

=== Traditional instruments ===
The regional variation in Botswana's traditional instruments reflects both the country's geography and the diversity of its peoples. The more densely populated eastern areas have different traditions from the western Kalahari region, and each ethnic community maintains its own instrumental customs.

==== Percussion ====
Matlhowa are rattles worn on the leg or ankle, traditionally made from over one hundred cocoons soaked, filled with pebbles or seeds, dried, and tied to a string. Other rattles were made using the ears of springboks. Wooden clappers and marapo hand clappers made from bone are also used. Clapping is central to Tswana and San performance traditions, typically at a beat of 4/4 or 2/4, and was historically considered the role of women in communal songs.

Drums are less common in Setswana folk music than in most other African traditions, a consequence of the difficulty of finding trees large enough to supply materials in the Kalahari Desert. The only drum type found in traditional Setswana music is the moropa, which can be made from a tree trunk, a milk jug, or a can. Modern drums in Botswana are often two-sided, made of a short metal cylinder wrapped in cowhide. The Kalanga people use drums more frequently than other peoples of Botswana. The Mbukushu use friction drums played by rubbing a reed against the drumhead. The Herero people use a two-sided ongoma beaten with sticks. The Kgatla people began using drums for women's bojale initiation ceremonies in 1871.

The setinkane, a thumb piano, has been one of the most widely played folk instruments in Botswana since the mid-twentieth century and has been popularised among the San by musicians including !Kaha.

==== String ====
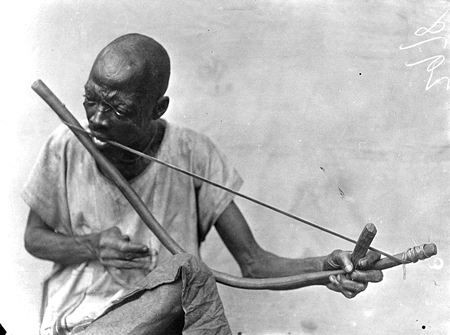
Musical bows are common string instruments in Batswana music.

Musical bows are common string instruments, including the lengope, the nkokwane, the segwana, and the mafata-iswaneng. Different bows are resonated through the mouth, a gourd, a tin can, or through the ground. Vocalisation and string instruments make up the largest portion of Setswana folk music. The segankuru, or segaba, is held on the shoulder using a wire and played with a bow in a circular motion, resembling a violin. It uses a bow lined with cow's tail hair and a tin can as resonator, and is the most commonly encountered folk instrument in modern Setswana music. The lesiba, also called a kwadi or gora, blends wind and string by putting a mouthpiece onto a quill run through the length of the bow. The San play the quashi, a bow-like lute, and also used an instrument with four to seven strings known by several names including daukashe and dzoma, played sitting with the resonator facing inward.

==== Wind ====
Wind instruments traditionally served practical roles such as communication between herders, calling cattle, summoning spirits, and warning of attack. Traditional wind instruments are often made of bone, reed, or animal horn. The lengwane and the motlhatswa, made from goat bone and a hollowed tree branch respectively, are blown across the top. The lepapata, made by soaking the horn of a greater kudu or a sable antelope in hot water to shape it, was used by the Tswana people for celebrations and warnings of attack. Reed flutes included the short high-pitched mpenyane and the low-pitched meporo, which could be nearly six feet long. Metal flutes replaced reed flutes during the twentieth century. Unlike the peoples of central Africa, the peoples of Botswana were never known to have used side-blown ivory horns.

=== Dikhwaere ===
Dikhwaere is a traditional Setswana choral music and dance genre in which groups perform combined singing and choreographed movement. It is most strongly associated with the Kgatleng region and other southern parts of Botswana. The word khwaere is a loanword from the English word "choir". Dikhwaere choirs perform at cultural festivals, land celebrations during the festive season, and national events. Since the introduction of the President's Day Arts Competition, it has also become a competitive form generating financial prizes. The Dikopelo Folk Music of Bakgatla ba Kgafela, the closely related tradition of the Bakgatla ba Kgafela community, has been recognised by UNESCO as an element of intangible cultural heritage. Dr Vom (Kangangwani Mogocha), born in 1977 in the North East District, is the most prominent contemporary recording artist in the dikhwaere genre. His 2007 song "Tsaya Thobane", recorded in collaboration with the Rangers Marena Choir from Artesia, became a fixture at national sporting events and cultural gatherings to the degree that it is described in Botswana media as an unofficial national anthem. At the 50T050 celebrations of Botswana's fifty years of independence in 2016, Dr Vom was pulled on stage without announcement and the crowd sang along to the full performance, after which the Gaborone District Commissioner led a 5-kilometre march continuing the song.

== Colonial period and early recording ==
Beginning in the 19th century, immigrants from the United Kingdom began arriving in large numbers and called the colony Bechuanaland. European missionaries arriving in the nineteenth and early twentieth centuries challenged the close link between traditional music and indigenous spiritual practice, and the norms introduced by colonial administration substantially ended many daily musical traditions. The missionaries' lack of interest in documenting traditional music meant it was recorded less thoroughly than other topics of the period. Christian denominations that developed natively, like the Zion Christian Church, incorporate native healing songs in their practices.

As Botswana's education system expanded in the 1950s, choir was widely taught and became a popular competitive activity. The Brown Kalanga Wizards were the first recording group from the territory that is now Botswana, forming in the 1950s and producing two albums. Traditional folk music experienced a resurgence as part of Botswana's independence movement and the construction of a national identity during the same decade.

== Post-independence and radio ==
National radio broadcasts began in the 1960s, with choir and folk singing the most common genres on air. The folk singer and segaba player Ratsie Setlhako was one of the most prominent post-independence musicians, performing at most national events from Botswana's independence in 1966 until his death in 1976.

Botswana was one of the first African countries to develop a hip hop following as the genre arrived in the early 1980s. Traditional music saw a resurgence with the musical group Mogwana in 1991. South African music, including kwaito and motswako, spread into Botswana following the end of Apartheid in 1994 and open cross-border cultural exchange.

The Botswana Telecommunications Authority began issuing private radio broadcasting licences in 1998. Yarona FM and Gabz FM both launched in 1999. Yarona FM, which started broadcasting on 22 August 1999, was the first independent radio station in the country and initially covered Gaborone within a 50-kilometre radius before receiving a national broadcast licence in June 2007. It was awarded the Botswana Music Awards for Best Radio Station in 2008 and 2009. Its programming focused primarily on RnB, hip hop, motswako, and pop, and it has been one of the principal platforms through which new Botswana music has reached young audiences nationally. South African jazz, kwaito, and hip hop became the major popular genres in Botswana by the late 1990s, with hip hop overtaking kwaito to become the country's most popular music genre by approximately 2003.

== Hip hop and motswako ==
Hip hop reached Botswana from the United States in the early 1980s, initially embraced by children from middle-class families exposed to American popular culture through television and imported music. Because of this, English-language rapping in Botswana typically uses American English. The earliest hip hop of Botswana incorporated sampling, drum machines, beatboxing, turntablism, and instrumentation. Its early association with wealth and elitism worked against it, and throughout the 1990s the genre was marginalized by record labels, event promoters, and club owners in favor of kwaito.

A critical moment in the genre's Botswana history came through radio. Ndala Baitsile, known as DJ Sid, ran a show called Rap Blast on Radio Botswana 2 (RB2) in the early 1990s. David Balsher (Draztik) and Salim Mosidinyane (Slim) followed, running the Strictly Hip Hop show on RB2 and Yarona FM's Sprite Rap Activity, while both were also members of the hip hop group Cashless Society. These broadcasts brought the genre to a broader audience despite industry resistance. Other radio hosts, such as David Molosiwa (D-Ski), also contributed to its spread.

From around 2000, hip hop's fortunes improved sharply. New acts including Tha Orakle, Apollo Diablo (later Apollo D), Zeus, Scar, and Stagga built national followings. DJ Sid and Prez Beatz compiled the influential P-Side Compilation, featuring emcees Mista Doe, Nomadic, Scar, and Desma. The Channel O Award for Best Southern African Artist went to Mista Doe in 2006 for Hot to Death, the first such continental recognition for a Botswana hip hop artist. The Wizards were among the early hip hop groups in Botswana, also incorporating reggae and rhythm and blues. The record label Phat Boy signed Batswana hip hop artists.

Motswako is a hip hop subgenre unique to Botswana, in which rhymes are primarily delivered in Setswana. It was popularised by Tebogo Mapine, known as Nomadic, a Francistown-born South African artist who was a member of the Gaborone group P-Side Crew from 1994. Thato Matlhabaphiri (Scar) and Game Bantsi (Zeus) are the most prominent motswako artists to emerge from the post-2010 generation. Zeus, who also appeared on Big Brother Africa, described motswako as rooted in Tswana identity and African cultural affirmation. The post-2010 period also saw the emergence of prominent female rappers including Sasa Klaas, who performed at the DStv iRock Festival in South Africa. Hip hop music videos in Botswana are associated with detailed storytelling.

== Kwaito and kwasa kwasa ==
Kwaito emerged from the townships of Johannesburg in the 1990s as a syncretic form combining marabi, kwela, mbaqanga, with House, Hip-Hop, Dancehall Reggae, and South African pop. It crossed into Botswana and generated a significant local scene. Thabo Mapetla Ntirelang is another prominent kwaito artist. Kwaito is commonly performed in South African languages like Afrikaans and Zulu, as well as American English.

Kwaito kwasa, a genre created by Odirile Vee Sento, known as Vee Mampeezy, by fusing kwaito with kwasa kwasa rhythms, is considered a genre original to Botswana. Vee Mampeezy's music videos, several of which have accumulated millions of views, have been directed partly by videographer Jack Bohloko, whose collaboration with South African artist Master KG on the song Tshinada produced a video passing 10 million views on YouTube.

Kwasa kwasa, a dance-based genre originating in the Democratic Republic of Congo, was localised in Botswana by artists including "Franco" (Frank Lesokwane), Chris Manto 7, Les Africa Sounds, and Jeff Matheatau. The word "kwasa kwasa" is the Congolese French equivalent of "move your body".

== Popular music ==
Botswana's popular music is broadly referred to as jazz, which is common among African countries, though it is distinct from the jazz that originated in the Western world. Botswana has relatively few native popular music artists, and most of the country's popular music is imported from Europe, South Africa, and the United States. American rock and gospel have a presence in Botswana.

The development of rock music's popularity in Botswana has been gradual. The music has gained momentum partly due to mainstream media such as MTV, Channel O, and the internet. Since 2000, many new bands have been formed, with some touring southern Africa. Rock culture has been recognised with bands uniting in a "Rock Against AIDS" tour. Crackdust was a notable metal band in Botswana. The National Music Eisteddfod is held annually in Selebi-Phikwe.

== Contemporary artists ==
=== Soul, R&B, and genre-fluid artists ===
Mpho Sebina (born 18 July 1989, Mochudi) is the most internationally recognised Botswana artist of the contemporary period. A singer and songwriter working across soul, R&B, jazz, Tswana folk, and Afro-fusion, she studied at the Multimedia University of Malaysia before pursuing music professionally. In September 2018, Global Citizen labelled her "an artist to look out for." In 2019 she was selected as one of ten recipients of a music scholarship through the Goethe Institute and Pop Kultur Festival in Berlin. In 2024, she became a member of the Recording Academy, which oversees the Grammy Awards, making her the first Motswana musician to achieve that distinction. The induction was followed by an invitation to the 67th Annual Grammy Awards.

Dato Seiko (born Katlego Ntirang) is a Gaborone-based singer-songwriter working across alternative, R&B, and soul. Trained in film production at AFDA Botswana, she released her debut EP Grace Effect in 2021. Her 2023 single The Vow was distributed through Warner Music Africa and generated over 44,000 user-created videos on TikTok with a combined view count exceeding 44.8 million.

Boago Fenju (born Boago Setiko, Gaborone) is a gospel, jazz, and neo-soul artist who released three albums under Chankieland Production Studios between 2019 and 2024. In 2025 she was selected as one of six overall winners in the second African Music Academy (AMA) prizes across the entire African continent and diaspora, becoming a member of the AMA Honorary Committee.

Khoisan is an Afro-fusion duo from Gaborone comprising Thabang Rasefako and Oratile Kofa. Formed in 2018 under Roc Lefatshe Records, the duo secured a publishing deal with South African label Muthaland for their debut single Marabele and received airplay on Mafikeng FM. Their 2021 single Mpoledise became one of the most widely played songs in Botswana that year. The duo was selected to represent Botswana at the FNB Africa Day concert and appeared on the Mzansi Magic programme Afropop Nation.

Apollo D (Monametsi Nkhukhu) is a rapper who began his career around 2005 as part of the first wave of Botswana hip hop artists. In December 2024 he released Blood is Thicker than Water, a ten-track album produced with Bangu Matenge, addressing themes of loyalty, healing, and forgiveness.

Jeff Matheatau is a prominent Motswana rapper and kwasa kwasa artist.

== Music awards and industry infrastructure ==
=== Yarona FM Music Awards ===
The Yarona FM Music Awards (YAMAs) are Botswana's most prominent annual music industry awards, hosted by Yarona FM. The YAMAs cover categories including Best Male Single, Best Female Single, Best Hip Hop/Motswako, Best RnB, Best Collabo, Best Producer, Best New Artist, Song of the Year, and People's Choice Artist of the Year. Winners are determined through a combination of public voting and a panel of judges. The awards have featured a Hall of Fame category honouring artists who made lasting contributions to Botswana's music scene. The eighth edition in November 2023 distributed prize money to its major award winners, with Han C taking Artiste of the Year, Best Male Single, and Best Afro-Pop, having also dominated the 2020 edition with five awards including Artist of the Year and Song of the Year for "Rejection" with DJ Kuchi.

Sponsorship for the 2021 edition reached 1.45 million pula, drawn from Mascom, First National Bank of Botswana, and the Ministry of Youth Empowerment, Sport and Culture. The awards expected to benefit over 200 creatives including musicians, dancers, instrumentalists, fashion designers, graphic designers, and creative directors that year.

=== Television platforms ===
Botswana Television (BTV), which launched in July 2000, has hosted three long-running music programmes that have been central to the exposure of Botswana artists nationally. Mokaragana is a live music performance show broadcasting on Saturday evenings in which artists perform before a live studio audience. It prioritises live performance and has attracted sustained corporate sponsorship including from Orange Botswana and Blue Crystal Sugar. Flava Dome is a Friday night primetime show featuring music videos and live performances, co-hosted from 2013 to 2018 by Loungo Pitse (KingBee) and Sadi Dikgaka, before continuing under Dikgaka's sole presentation. Pula Power is the third of the principal BTV music programmes. BTV's satellite signal is carried across southern Africa including South Africa, Namibia, Zambia, Lesotho, and Zimbabwe, giving these shows a regional reach.

=== National Arts Council ===
The National Arts Council of Botswana (NACB), established by Parliament under the National Arts Council Act 2020 and commencing operations in 2022, is the statutory body responsible for funding, promoting, and developing Botswana's creative and cultural sector. Its mandate covers music alongside other creative disciplines. It has distributed significant public funds to artists including P70 million in COVID-19 relief, P39 million for content creation, and P14 million for cross-country recordings. By 2025, the council had drawn public criticism from the creative sector over governance disputes and delayed operationalisation of its funding mechanisms.

== Industry and economics ==
Radio stations in Botswana often broadcast popular music. Each music station has a format, or a category of songs to be played, generally similar to but not identical to ordinary generic classification. Many radio stations in Botswana are locally owned media.

An independent music industry exists and some artists remain at an indie label for their entire careers. Indie musicians often release some or all of their songs over the internet for fans to download and listen. Vendors often sell CDs made specifically to be played at weddings, featuring both wedding music and pop music.

== Education ==
Music is taught in primary education and offered as an elective in secondary and tertiary education. Dance is generally included within music education. High schools generally offer classes in singing, mostly choral, and instrumentation in the form of a large school band.

== Holidays and festivals ==
Public events and gatherings in Botswana are frequently accompanied by music, including holiday gatherings, fairs, dedications, and other celebrations. Each type of event or subject has its own associated songs. It is common for individuals and groups to sing in public, sometimes spontaneously. Music plays a major part in the celebration of Christmas, and Botswana is home to numerous music festivals showcasing styles ranging from house to jazz to hip hop.

== Decline of traditional instruments ==
Since independence in 1966, many traditional Batswana instruments have disappeared as rapid urbanisation disrupted the conditions under which they were made and played. Musicologists including PR Kirby and Ike Norborg documented that some instruments, such as the reed flute mokoreje, began disappearing as early as the 1930s. Music In Africa noted in 2018 that only a few mainstay instruments had survived, and that the ability to make and play most traditional instruments had been lost in most communities.

== See also ==
- Culture of Botswana
- Dance in Botswana
- List of Botswana musicians
- Music of Africa
- Dr Vom
- Dikhwaere
- Mpho Sebina
- Apollo D
- Dato Seiko
- Boago Fenju
- Khoisan (band)
- Yarona FM
- Yarona FM Music Awards
- Mokaragana
- Flava Dome
- National Arts Council of Botswana
- Botswana hip hop
