= List of Botswana musicians =

Musicians and music groups from Botswana.

== Afro-pop/jazz ==
- Samantha Mogwe
- Amantle Brown

== Folk ==
- Culture Spears
- Matsieng

== Kwaito ==
- Odirile Vee Sento

== Kwasa kwasa ==
- Franco and Afro Musica
- Kwasa Kwasa Band

== Rock and metal ==
- Crackdust
- Overthrust
- Skinflint
- Wrust
