= Samantha Mogwe =

Botswana singer and songwriter

- Citizenship: Botswana
- Occupations: Musician; Songwriter; Voice coach; Businessperson

Samantha Mogwe is a Botswana musician. Her music is a fusion of R&B, Jazz and African.

== Early life and education ==
Mogwe was born in Botswana to a Zambian mother and a Motswana father.

She has a degree in Theology from Baptist Theological College in Rustenburg and also studied music at Trinity College London.

== Career ==
Mogwe started her music from an early age, her first performance was with My African Dream in 2003. In 2004 she became the winner of Gabz Karioke Idols and in 2008 she was the only representative for Botswana at Idols East Africa, making it to the top 24. She released her first album dubbed Transition in 2015. In 2018 she released a new single called "Secrets". In 2021 she released visuals for the song "Beautiful". In 2022 August she released a single called "Oxygen" and in November she released the EP titled VII.

In June and July 2022, Mogwe made Botswana's top ten most played songs list. For the 12th Edition of BOMU Awards Samantha have been nominated for the Best R&B, Best music video, best collaboration, best female artistand best song of the year (Marang). On 16th of December 2023 Bomu Awards held its 12th Edition at Roya Aria Stadium in Tlokweng and Samantha walked away with two awards being the best collaboration with Mpho Sebina for the song Marang and best R&B for the album VII.

== Personal life ==
Mogwe is married with two children. She is noted to be private about her life.

== Awards and nominations ==
- 2003; My African Dream singing category: Runner up
- 2004: Gabs Kareoke Idols as the Youngest Contestant: Winner
- 2014: Yarona FM Music Awards (YAMA): Winner Best female Artist of the year
- 2014: Yarona FM Awards (YAMA): Winner Best Female Artist
- 2015: BOMU Awards: Winner Best Packaged Album
- 2015: African Muzik Magazine Awards: Best Female Southern Africa nominee

== See also ==
- Vee Mampeezy
- Sasa Klaas
- Ross Branch
