= Sasa Klaas =

Motswanan singer-songwriter (1993–2021)

Sarona ‘Sasa Klaas’ Motlhagodi
- Born: Sarona Motlhagodi; 17 May 1993
- Origin: Gaborone, Botswana
- Died: 5 March 2021 (aged 27) Xumabee Game Ranch, Botswana
- Genres: Dance; House; Pop
- Occupations: Singer; Writer; Artist
- Instrument: Vocals
- Years active: 2010–2021

Sarona Motlhagodi (17 May 1993 – 5 March 2021), known professionally as Sasa Klaas, was a Botswana singer, rapper, songwriter and television presenter. She was born on 17 May 1993 in Botswana and raised by her single mother Anna Mokgethi, a Motswana politician. She was an all-round musician and considered Botswana's "First Lady of Hip-Hop". She made her debut with her hit single Mma Mongwato. She was in a relationship with Bakang Baxon Moitoi.

== Career ==
Klaas's interest in performing and music started early when she won a dance competition at Woolworths at age 4. She went on to study for a Degree in Film and Television Production at Limkokwing University of Creative Technology, but left to follow her musical ambitions.

Sasa Klaas' career took off with A Ke Mo Khande, a collaboration with artist Thato Matlhabaphiri (Scar). Soon after in 2011 she became a presenter of The Foundation: Next Level from 2011 to 2012 on e.tv Botswana. Her first solo single, HADSAN, was released. The song title, an acronym for “Hustle All Day, Stunt All Night,” is an ode to female rappers being just as capable as male rappers. Klaas would later release a clothing label under the name HADSAN.

In 2018, Klaas began co-hosting "Highly Inappropriate With Phat Joe", a television show on DStv's Moja Love station in South Africa. In 2020 at the start of the pandemic, Klaas returned to Botswana from where she was living in South Africa.

Described as "one of Botswana's celebrated talents", Klaas would rap both in English and in Setswana. Critics have described her lyrics and persona as feminist. She actively campaigned against gender based violence in Botswana, appearing on billboards to support female empowerment. Prior to her death, she had been the victim of cyberbullying.

== Death and legacy ==
Klaas died on 5 March 2021 around 7pm at age of 27 from injuries suffered in a R44 helicopter crash in Xumabee Game Ranch (near Sojwe). After the accident, Klaas was left at the scene of the accident as the helicopter pilot went to find help. After waiting hours for help, she died enroute to a hospital in the back of a truck in the Kgalagadi Desert.

== Discography ==
=== Singles ===
- Mma Mongwato
- H.A.D.S.A.N
- Playing with Myself
- You
- The Best Things
- Vapors
- Bafana ba style
- Mosoroto

== See also ==
- Anna Mokgethi
- Vee Mampeezy
- Zeus
- Ross Branch
- Charma Gal
