= Zeus (musician) =

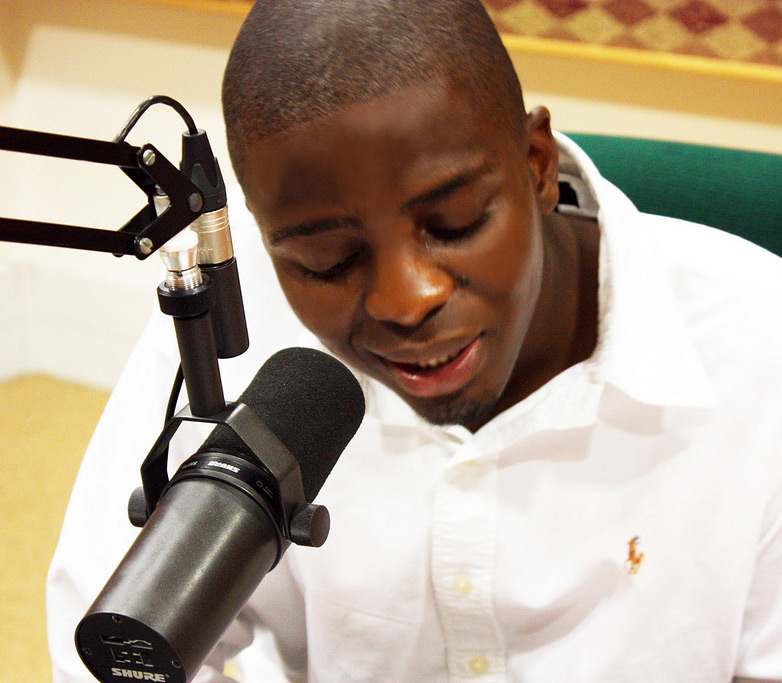
- Zeus at TeachAids recording session in 2010

Background information
- Born: Game Gaobaone Bantsi; 22 July 1986 (age 40); Serowe, Botswana
- Genres: Hip hop Motswako
- Occupations: Rapper, songwriter, businessman
- Years active: 2005–present
- Labels: DIY, OC Music

Game Goabaone Bantsi (born 22 July 1986), better known by his stage name Zeus, is a Motswana hip-hop artist, MC and businessman. He released a debut album, Freshly Baked, in 2008 which included the hits "Back in the days" and "Gijima". The album was generally well received and garnered him a Channel O Music Video award nomination and win in the Best Hip Hop video for the aforementioned "Gijima". His sophomore offering, 2009's The Flipside has been positively reviewed in both his home country as well as neighbouring South Africa. In 2010, he was ranked seventh in a list of the Top 15 South African Rappers and 4th on MNET's Top 10 African Rappers for 2010 compilation. Zeus currently splits his time between Gaborone, which is his hometown, and Johannesburg, South Africa.

== Early life ==
Zeus was born in Serowe and raised in Gaborone, the capital and largest city of Botswana. He has three siblings; two brothers and one sister and is the last born in the family of 4. On the musical tastes of his family members, he once stated in an interview, "My mother religiously loves gospel, my father is a fan of country music, my two brothers love hip-hop and dancehall respectively and my sister digs R&B. So, all sorts of music I was exposed to when growing up influenced the album." Zeus grew up in a Christian household and still identifies himself as a Christian.

== Education ==
Zeus completed his secondary school education at Rainbow High School, an independent school located in Gaborone in 2003. Thereafter he embarked upon a BCOMM in Marketing and Management degree at Monash University South Africa, graduating in 2007.

== Music career ==
...first and foremost in any language or country I consider myself an MC who is a creative writer, freestyler and deliverer of flows that the ear can not ignore. The fact that I am a Motswana and an African adds different dimensions to my Mcing that differentiates me from others in the international Hip Hop arena so I am an MC, an African MC and a Motswana MC.

— Zeus

In the early 2000s, a teenage Zeus began making a name for himself in the hip-hop scene in Botswana. His natural talent, flare, eloquence and refusal to be content with being "just another rapper" made him difficult to brush aside. 2008 saw his years of hard work come to fruition as his debut effort hit the shelves.

=== 2008–2009: Freshly Baked ===
In 2008, Zeus released his first album, Freshly Baked. The fourteen track record was met with very good reviews in Botswana and propelled him to star status in his homeland. Later that year, Zeus received crossover success when Freshly Baked was nominated for album of the year at the MTN-HYPE magazine Hip Hop awards in South Africa. This further solidified his talent as artist and widened the spectrum of his appeal. 2008 continued to be a good year for Zeus as the song that first put him on the map, "Imagination", was also nominated for the Best Reggae Dancehall video at the Channel O Music Video Awards At the end of 2009 Zeus had an impressive victory at the 2009 Channel O Music Video Awards when he beat out competition from the likes of Hip Hop Pantsula ("All I Need" video), Okyeame Kwame ("Woso" video), Jay Ru ("Big Boi Anthem" video), Pro ("Uthini Ngo Pro"), and Black Rhino ("Black Chata") to win Best Hip Hop Video for "Gijima".

=== 2009: The Flipside ===
18 December saw Zeus release his second album, The Flipside. The album was distributed by Soul Candi Records and was a partnership between D.I.Y/Rizn Entertainment, Octave couplet and Big Dawg productions. The album is made up of sixteen tracks and features the likes of RJ Benjamin, Don Juan, Stoan and Jon Jazi. Its most prominent singles have been "Out of my mind", "Diski Business" and its biggest hit to date, "Champagne Music". The video for "Champagne Music" has garnered him his third consecutive Channel O Music Video Award nomination – this time for Most Gifted Male Video. His video will be up against Wande Coal's "Bumper To Bumper", Banky W "Strong Thing", Black Coffee with the video for "Juju" featuring Bantwini and favourite K'NAAN's "T.I.A".

=== 2010: "Beef" with Scar ===
During a broadcast of their Yarona FM breakfast shows, The Real Enchilada (co-hosted with prominent media figure Tumi Ramsden), fellow Motswana rapper Scar displayed behaviour which did not amuse Zeus.Ramsden had just played a new track from Zeus' album and said that she liked it.Scar's opinion of the song was made apparent by a fake yawn. This led Zeus to post a comment on his Facebook page and Scar did the same on his page. The "war of posts" continued back and forth. The Voice reporter, Kabelo Dipholo asked both artists respectively about their feud via Facebook. Scar responded writing:

Zeus' version of their relationship was as follows:

... There is nothing to inbox. There is NOTHING going on between me and Zeus. I don't have any "beef" with any one of Botswana artists.

...I will end by saying that not too long ago Scar was my people; I even organized a gig at my old university campus in Gauteng bringing him and Stagga down, in fact I even tried getting him on some of the projects I was working on in SA including DJ Lemonka's Motswako Tape Vol 1. I was about building with the man not hating and I can give you a long list of people that can testify to this. Things seemed to change after his fallout with my manager and business partner late last year who he used to work with too but thereafter he had unkind words about my colleague in his HUB magazine interview, making snide remarks about the management label and as he put it the "number one" artist on it. I honestly find this situation childish and unproductive; we are arguably the two most internationally recognized brands in Botswana hip hop we should be working together not against each other!

=== 2012: Honey I'm Home mixtape ===
This is Zeus's 3rd official offering (set to be released 23 November 2012) and it is a mixtape that as the name suggests represents; firstly Zeus's return from a two-year hiatus, since 2009's critically acclaimed The Flipside album, and secondly his inauguration and coronation to the forefront of local as well as African hip hop as a whole. The 13 track masterpiece was recorded at Bedrock Studios and features production from long time collaborator Octave Couplet's Don Juan, new OC recruits K-Zo and Bash Boi as well as Rimzy and Bally from Heavensent Productions. The mixtape / freetape features verses from AKA, Tumi from the volume, Hydro, Don Juan, Thato_daPoet, Vusi, long time friend and collaborator KEB as well as up and comer Ozi F. Teddy.

=== 2013–2014: African Time ===
On 6 December 2013 Zeus dropped his third album and currently his most commercially successful album, African Time. It was preceded by the hit single "#Datswatsapp" featuring famous South African rappers AKA and Tumi Molekane. This single was nominated for a Channel 0 VMA for most gifted male video. Others singles released include "MaAfrika" and "Psych", all of which were released to critical acclaim.

Explaining the inspiration behind the album, which is a deviation from previous releases that tended to celebrate his lyricism as a hip hop artist, he said,

It has always been something that has been cultivated in me over the years, from a time when I became more and more aware of the context existing in today's world, especially in Africa. You get to see a lot that is wrong with the state of affairs of our people with the mindset, our general lack of ownership and control. How many opportunities seem to miss us even though we are in the most resource blessed continent yet still poor?

His current offering is characterized by a heavy African influence and focuses less on braggadocio and more on content and messages. The name of the album is a reflective trip through the landscapes and variety that is Africa.

According to Zeus the album title is a clever play on words:

Usually when we say African time it means we are either late or things are not delivered on time hence we usually say, Hei African time! I think it is a very negative connotation and I would like for us to change it to make it more positive and say African time is our time. It is our time to start giving the world something instead of taking from the world. I feel Africa has given the world a lot of things. A lot of aspects of Africanism that find way to pop culture, whether it's the dashiki or the drum, have not always had us Africans at the forefront. Today international labels have more African print than African fashion houses. We need to start to own what is ours and take it out there and start saying it is our time to influence popular culture globally.

The 15-track album boasts heavyweight collaborations with renowned artists and producers including Tumi, Kwela Tebza, Mahotella Queens, Mzekezeke, Ross Jack, Nonku Phiri and Ammara Brown among others. Motswako artist Tebogo Mapine popularly known as Nomadic designed the album cover.

"I find him very understanding because he is a very proud African and an artist himself, so when I mentioned the album title he had a concept in mind," Zeus said. "When I read the book Capitalist Nigga years ago in my late teens, it really resonated with me and to this day I feel like it's probably one of the inspirational books that has formed my outlook on life. Therefore the inspiration of this album to me is Africanism and the biggest philosophy is how we do things. We see in other cultures, for example Chinese people, their business principles stem from their tradition. How come it seems as though there is no connection between what we were yesterday and what we are today? Obviously that leads to a concern of who we will we be tomorrow when we don't have these identity cues."

The second single, "Fast Five" which also enjoyed airplay on local radio stations has kwasakwasa influence and when asked about the concept Zeus said, "We need to understand that music is inspired by other music. I am a very big crossover artist; my track Imagination was dancehall fused and Dancing shoes is a house tune. I have never limited myself to just being a rapper. I consider myself as an artist. For me that kwasa sound is a very strong traditional rhythm and it does not matter where you are in Africa. It only makes sense to make sounds that our parents can also relate to hence bridging the gap between the young and old."

=== 2014–present: Touch the Sky ===
In 2014 Zeus released a single "Touch the Sky" for Sky Girls BW. The single was made to motivate, inspire and encourage teenage girls in situations like peer pressure. Zeus released a single FEVER featuring Mizo Phyll from South Africa.

== Causes ==
Zeus has lent his talent and time to various organisations and causes which include: Childline Botswana, Oxfam International, Youth Health Organization (YOHO), a PEPFAR supported program dedicated to reducing new HIV infections among Batswana youth and most recently TeachAids. He has also championed for progress and growth in the Botswana Music Industry.

== Business ventures ==
A self-proclaimed serial entrepreneur in the creative arts, Zeus is founder and director of his own entertainment company that has previously released his work independently and in partnership with other independent and major record labels. After completing a postgraduate degree in Film and TV in 2016, the venture is set to take on production as part of its portfolio, with content already in different stages of development. In 2014 he joined a partnership that would result in the founding of Jam For Brunch, a popular monthly event in Botswana's capital that has changed the Sunday leisure market.

== Discography ==
- Freshly Baked (2008)
- The Flipside (2009)
- African Time (2013)

== See also ==
- Vee Mampeezy
- Ross Branch
- Sasa Klaas
- Charma Gal
