= Boko =

Boko may refer to:

== Linguistics ==
- Boko alphabet, a Latin alphabet used for the Hausa language
- Boko language, a language of Benin and Nigeria
- Boko (Iboko) language, part of the Bala language, a Bantu language in the Democratic Republic of Congo

== People ==
- Duma Boko, president of Botswana since 2024

== Places ==
- Boko, Burkina Faso, a town in Burkina Faso
- Boko District, in the Pool Region, Republic of the Congo
- Boko-Songho, district in Bouenza, Republic of the Congo
- Boko, Kamrup, a town in South Kamrup district of Assam, India
- Boko (Vidhan Sabha constituency), Assam
- Boko, Senegal, a village in the Bignona Department of Senegal

== Other ==
- Boko (Final Fantasy) or Boco, a fictional character in the video game series Final Fantasy
- Boko Haram, a terrorist group in West Africa
- Boko Yout, a Swedish music group
- Boko the Bobcat, a mascot of the athletic teams of Texas State University
- Bokoblin, enemies in the Legend of Zelda

== See also ==
- Boco (disambiguation)
- Mboko (disambiguation)
