= Ndingo Johwa =

Motswana musician (born 1950)

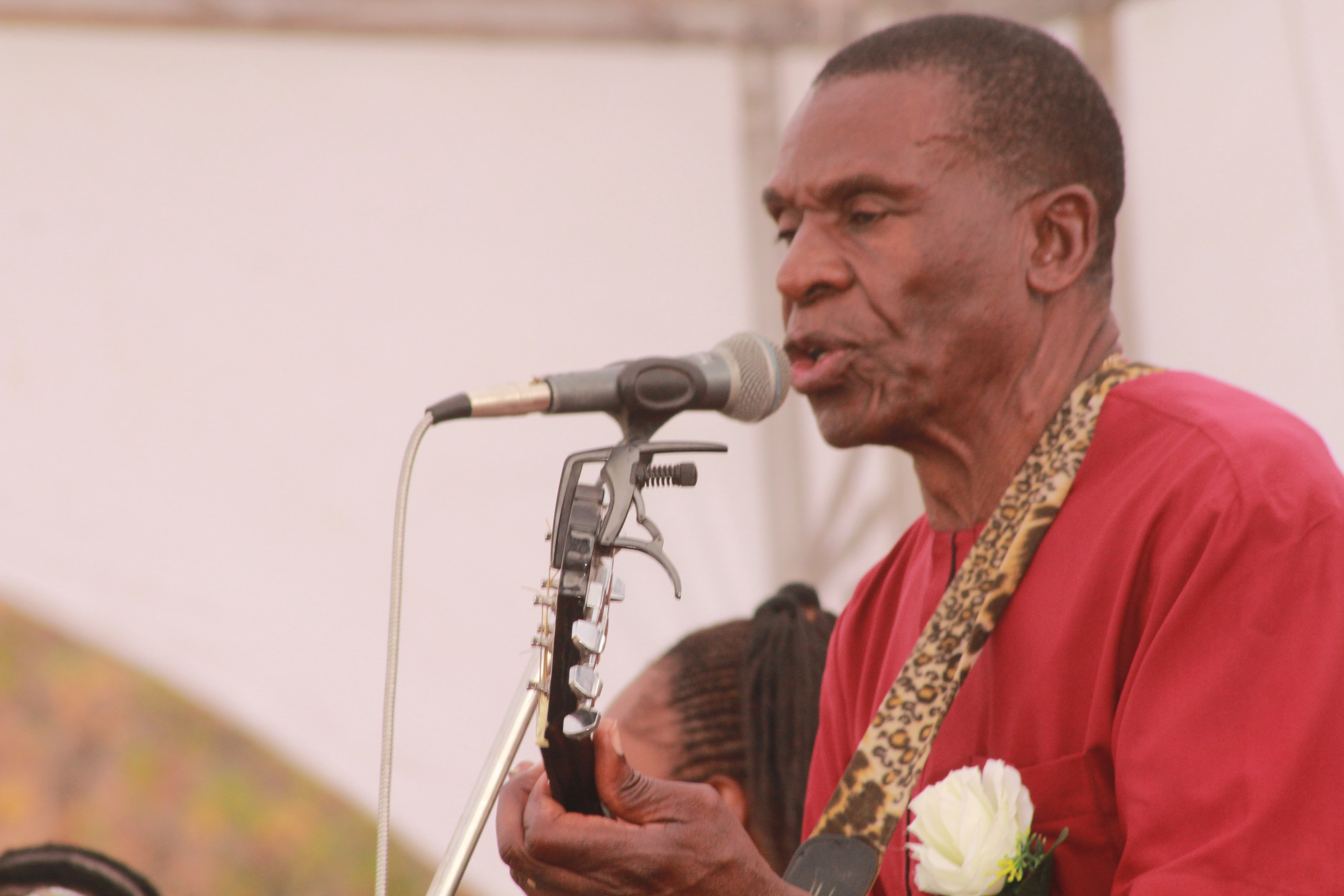

Background information
- Born: 4 April 1950 (age 76); Botswana, Ramokgwebana
- Genre: Jazz
- Occupations: Musician, singer, composer, bandleader
- Instruments: Guitar, flugelhorn, trombone, cornet, vocals

Ndingo Johwa (born 4 April 1950) is a Motswana trumpeter, flugelhornist, cornetist, guitarist, composer and singer. He is known for his jazz compositions, as well as for writing the Phondanyama song. He is part of the Re Batswana Music Ensemble.

== Early life ==
Ndingo Johwa was born in Ramokgwebana, a village in the North-East District of Botswana, close to the eastern border, which is defined by the Ramokgwebana River. Plumtree, Zimbabwe is on the other side of the border crossing. He began singing as a child in church as a baritone singer, in the church choir. He later went for guitar lessons, like Louis Mhlanga, in the Francistown Baptist church Botswana in 1970. During that time, Johwa played for the church and sang the likes of gumbaya songs, it was something he said enjoyed most. As time went, he discovered himself and later proposed to start his own songs using his mother tongue Kalanga, through that he brought to life a new genre that he named IkaJazz from the word Ikalanga jazz.

== Career ==
Johwa is involved in several social initiatives, he has participated in the Sponsored walk organised by debswana mines. The sponsored walk entailed the psycho-social support project for Orphans. He participated in the corporate social responsibility initiatives by Botswana Railways.

Johwa made his live performances at his visit to South Africa in July 2012 at the Grahamstown national art festival.

== Awards and honours ==
Ndingo Johwa
Year	Category	Title	Genre	Label	Result
2012	Live artist – Instrumental	Phondanyama	Jazz		Nominated

=== Awards ===
1. Presidents' Day (Botswana) celebrations certificate, Live artist, (first place). 14 July 2012, Received from his Excellency the President of the Republic of Botswana Ian Khama.
2. Presidential certificate of honour, long and faithful service, 28 September 2010.
3. Presidents' Day (Botswana) celebrations certificate, (Second place)20 July 2009.
4. The third annual Mascom Bomu Music Award, Best Folk album 2009.
5. Orange Botswiriri artist award, 1st position 2007.
6. Mascom Bomu Music Award, Best Folk Album 2006.
7. Botswana Music Union, Best traditional music album 2001.

== Sources ==
- Murphy, Alan; Armstrong, Kate; Bainbridge, James; Firestone, Matthew D. (11 March 2010). Southern Africa. Lonely Planet. p. 121. ISBN 978-1-74059-545-2.
