= Mokgethi =

Mokgethi is a surname. Notable people with the surname include:

- Anna Mokgethi (fl. 2019), Motswana politician
- Nomathemba Mokgethi (fl. 2014), South African politician
