= Loungo Andre Pitse =

- Born: Loungo Andre Pitse; 4 January 1989 (age 37); Botswana
- Other name: KingBee
- Education: Master's degree, University of Botswana
- Occupations: Television presenter, Radio personality
- Years active: 2008–present
- Employer: Yarona FM
- Known for: Hosting Yarona FM Music Awards, Flava Dome, Miss Botswana events
- Notable work: Flava Dome, Yarona FM Music Awards
- Awards: Botswana’s Top 30 Under 30 Inspirational Youth (2016)

Loungo Andre Pitse (born 4 January 1989) also known as KingBee is a Botswana television and radio personality. He, alongside Bonang Matheba, hosted the 2019 Yarona FM Music Awards (YAMA’s). He was listed among Botswana’s “Top 30 Under 30 Inspirational Youth” (2016).

== Early life ==
Pitse is a third child of his parents. He hold a Master's Degree from the University of Botswana.

== Career ==
He had his first job in the entertainment industry with the No. 1 Ladies Detective Agency production where he acted alongside Jill Scott and Idris Elba. In 2010 to 2012, he was the presenter for My African Dream audition alongside Anika Noni Rose before joining Flava Dome in 2013.

In 2023, he hosted the Miss Botswana Fashion Show and the Miss Botswana final. Alongside MC Mtkay Ntwana, he hosted the Vic Falls Carnival. He was co-host for the DStv Delicious Festival in South Africa alongside Bonang Matheba. Pitse works with Yarona FM.

== Controversy ==
In 2023, Pitse drew public attention after wearing a green dress during an appearance in Zambia, where homosexuality is criminalized.

== Events hosted ==
- The Diamond Conference by De Beers and Debswana
- The Light Awards by De Beers and Debswana
- Yarona FM Music Awards (YAMAs) with Bonang Matheba
- BNSC Awards
- F&B Botswana Awards
- Standard Chartered Awards
- Ministry of Youth Awards
- The launch of Now TV

== See also ==
- Yarona FM
- Media of Botswana
