= Ross Branch (motorcyclist) =

Botswana motorcycle racer

Personal information
- Nickname: Kalahari Ferrari
- Nationality: Botswana
- Born: Ross Branch; 6 May 1986 (age 40) Johannesburg, South Africa
- Height: 1.74 m (5 ft 9 in)
- Weight: 79 kg (174 lb)
- Spouse: Aimee Leigh Branch (m. 2017)
- Website: www.rossbranch.co.bw

Sport
- Country: Botswana
- Sport: Off-Road Motorcycle Racing
- Team: Hero Motorsports Rally Team

Achievements and titles
- World finals: 2019 2nd place Merzouga Rally, Morocco; Winner Rookie category at 2019 Dakar Rally, Peru; Winner of the Torgau 24-hour Endurance race 2005 (Germany); Winner of the Southern Pokal Championship in 2003 (Germany); 2nd place Russian Race Series in 2003 (Russia); Scored world championship points in 4 MX GP’s
- Regional finals: South African Overall and OR1 Cross Country champion in 2018; South African Overall and OR1 Cross Country champion in 2017; South African Overall and OR1 Cross Country champion in 2016; Winner of the Botswana 1000 Desert Race in 2011, 2012, 2014, 2015, 2016, 2017 and 2018; Red Bull Braveman Extreme Enduro Finisher 2016; Roof of Africa Gold Finisher 2011
- National finals: Winner of the Khawa Dune Challenge in 2013, 2014, 2015, and 2017 (Botswana); Awarded South African colours for Motocross in 2004

Ross Branch (born 6 May 1986) is a motorcycle racer from Botswana. He lives in Gaborone, Botswana, and he rode for the KTM Off-Road Racing Team until October 2018. He now races for the Hero MotorSports International Rally team. Branch is the first Dakar stage winner from Botswana, after taking the stage 2 victory at the Dakar Rally 2020. Often considered as one of the best off-road motorcycle racers in the world, he is the current World Rally-Raid Champion.

== Early life ==
Branch was born in Johannesburg, South Africa, and his parents brought him to Jwaneng three days after he was born. Branch's parents are Kevin Branch a former Debswana employee and Glenda Branch. Branch attended Krugersdorp High School in Gauteng. Branch's love for speed and adrenaline started when he first witnessed the final stage of the 1992 Dakar Rally in Cape Town at just five years old. He started riding motorbikes at the age of ten. At 18 years old, he was invited to ride on the South African colours for Motocross, giving him a taste of professional freestyle.

== Career ==
2024: 2nd Dakar Rally, (Winner of Stage 1 and Stage 11)

2020: 21st Dakar Rally, (Winner of Stage 2)

2019: 13th Dakar Rally (Best Rookie) / 2nd Merzouga Rally / 9th Morocco Rally

2018: 1st, South African OR1 Cross Country Championship / 1st, Botswana 1000 Desert Race

2017: 1st, South African OR1 Cross Country Championship / 1st, Botswana 1000 Desert Race / 1st, Khawa Dune Challenge

2016: 1st, South African OR1 Cross Country Championship / 1st, Botswana 1000 Desert Race / 1st, African Motorcycle Union Continental Motocross Championship / Finisher, Red Bull Braveman Extreme Enduro

2015: 1st, Botswana 1000 Desert Race / 1st, Khawa Dune Challenge

2014: 1st, Botswana 1000 Desert Race / 1st, Khawa Dune Challenge

2013: 1st, Khawa Dune Challenge

2012: 1st, Botswana 1000 Desert Race

2011: Gold finisher, Roof of Africa / 1st, Botswana 1000 Desert Race / 1st, African Motorcycle Union Continental Motocross Championship

=== Dakar Rally ===
Year	Class	Vehicle	Position	Stages won
2019	Motorbike	(Austria) KTM	13th	0
2020	Motorbike	(Austria) KTM	21st	1
2021	Motorbike	(Japan) Yamaha	DNF	0
2022	Motorbike	(Japan) Yamaha	DNF	0
2023	Motorbike	(India) Hero	26th	2
2024	Motorbike	(India) Hero	2nd	2
2025	Motorbike	(India) Hero	DNF	0

== Sponsorships ==
- Yamaha
- Monster Energy

== Personal life ==
Branch has been together with Aimee Crewe-Brown since he was 20 years old and they married in 2017. They have three Jack Russells.

== See also ==
- Sasa Klaas
- Zeus
- Anna Mokgethi
- Charma Gal
