= Mboko =

Mboko may refer to:

== Culture ==
- Mboko language, Congo
- Mboko people, Cameroon
  - their Wumboko language
- Mboko dialect of Chung-Mboko language

== People ==
- Ayrton Mboko (born 1997), Belgian footballer
- Victoria Mboko (born 2006), Canadian tennis player
- Mboko Basiami Motswana fashion designer

== Places ==
- Mboko, Cameroon; a region in Southern Cameroon.

== See also ==
- Boko (disambiguation)
