= Boco =

Boco may refer to:

== Places ==
- Boco, Les Anglais, Haiti; a village
- Boco River, a river in Portugal
- El Boco Airport, Quillota, Valparaíso, Chile
- Boco, a small agricultural locality or Townland in the Quillota Province, Chile
- BoCO, an abbreviation of the town Boulder, Colorado

== People and characters ==
- Georges Boco (born 1963), Beninese boxer
- Romuald Boco (born 1985), Beninese football player

=== Fictional character ===
- Boco (Final Fantasy) or Boko, a fictional character in the video game series Final Fantasy
- BoCo (The Railway Series), a fictional diesel locomotive in The Railway Series books
  - BoCo (Thomas and Friends), the corresponding character in the adapted TV series Thomas and Friends

== Other uses ==
- BoCo, a locomotive wheel arrangement description using the UIC classification system
- BoCo, an informal moniker for The Boston Conservatory

== See also ==
- Boeing Company
- Boko (disambiguation)
