= Amantle Brown =

Motswana singer and songwriter

- Born: Amantle Ntshole; November 19, 1993 (age 32); Morwa, Botswana
- Genres: Afropop; R&B
- Occupations: Singer; Songwriter
- Instrument: Vocals
- Years active: 2010–present

Amantle Ntshole, known professionally as Amantle Brown, is a Motswana singer and songwriter working primarily in Afropop and R&B. She gained public attention following her appearance on the Botswana Television talent competition My Star.

== Early life ==
Ntshole was born on 19 November 1993 in Morwa, Botswana.

== Career ==
Ntshole appeared as a finalist on My Star, where she developed a public following. Following the show, she released singles including Black Mampatile, which received airplay on local radio stations.

Her debut album, Sa Pelo (2016), received multiple nominations at the Botswana Musicians Union awards, including categories for song, album, and R&B performance.

Subsequent releases include Follo, which incorporates Afrobeats influences, and Bereka Mosadi, a song thematically directed at women audiences.

She has also appeared as a judge on Botswana Television programming.

== Discography ==
=== Albums ===
- Sa Pelo (2016)

=== Selected singles ===
- Black Mampatile
- Follo
- Bereka Mosadi

== See also ==
- Music of Botswana
