= Gabane =

- city
- Location in Botswana
- Coordinates: 24°40′S 25°47′E
- Country: Botswana
- District: Kweneng District

Population (2011)
  - Total: 14,842

Gabane is a village in Kweneng District of Botswana. It is located 15 km (10 mi) west of Gaborone, the capital of Botswana. The population was 10,399 in 2001 census, making it the fourth largest settlement in Kweneng. Its population was 14,842 at the 2011 census. It is part of Gaborone agglomeration, home to 421,907 inhabitants according to the 2011 census.

This village is originally home to BaMalete tribe. Kgosi Mosadi Seboko is the paramount chief and is stationed at Ramotswa, the capital of Balete. The elder population tends towards agriculture, while the younger generations are more urbanized.

== The culture of Gabane ==
Gabane is well known for her lively music scene and night life as well as contemporary fashion trends. The village has produced several live bands like Matsieng and Franco and Afro Musica. The residents of Gabane are passionate football followers. Their most successful team, Uniao Flamengo Santos, plays in the National Premier League. There a few teams playing at regional football level, under Kweneng Region, they are Gabane United; Moritshane Lions and Blackburn Callies, whilst Jet Fighters plays in Gaborone Region

== Bogosi Jwa Gabane ==
- Kgosi SEELETSO ALBERT PULE:Senior Chief Representative
- KGOSI SELLO FRANCE PULE: Chief Representative
- KGOSI LEKGOANYANA KLAAS MOATHOLDI:Headman of Records
  - ===Dikgotla(Wards) of Gabane===**
- Kgosing..Robert Soko Kagiso(headman)
- Rasoko..Stephen Pule
- MOKATENG..?
- MOENG..Thomas Kebonyemotse
- LONAKA..Douglas Bogope
- HERERO..Barnabas Angura
- KHUDU..David Masokwane
- LENKWANE..Baaname Baaname
- PHELEFU..Makgoa Reginah Maotwe
- SHAUDI..Ikaneng Ntutu
- MOSIDI(1)..Kenosi
- MOSIDI..Billy Motladiile
- MOKOLWE..Omphemetse Moremi
- MANKGA..Tita Seleke
- MAKATI..Robert Makati
- DIREMOGOLO..Modise Makati
- NKOYAPHIRI..Oratile Bodibane
- LESIRANE..Mosimanegape Mogafe
- DINGWE..John Kunene Dingwe
- TSHIELO..Ramasimo Mholo
- KOBUA..?
- MATLANYANA..?
- MADISA..Joel Maswabi
- GASIKO..Thomas Gosekwang
- TSHETLHANA..Tshetlhana
- MOGAMPANE..Ramakwati
- MOARABI..Peter Manthe
- TIPING..Manthe Manthe
- SEGONA.. D. Kgope

== Notable people ==
- Frank Lesokwane, musician, Franco and Afro Musica
- Matsieng, traditional group
- Innocent Ranku, footballer, Uniao Flamengo Santos
- Pius Mokgware, member of parliament Republic of Botswana
- Emma Wareus, Miss Botswana 2010. First runner-up at Miss World 2010

== Lonaka Ward and culture ==
Lonaka ward is under the main kgosing ward.It originates in South Africa at a place called Lekgophung.

It was led by Kgosi Mannyedi Ramohupetsa Moatswi when some of the Balete moved from South Africa into Botswana under the leadership of Kgosi Pule in late 1800's.

After the death of kgosi Mannyedi Ramohupetsa Moatswi, Lonaka ward was led by his son Bogope Samuel Moatswi.Bogope Moatswi was born in 1903 and died in 1994.

Lonaka kgotla was then led by Bogope's son Monoge David Bogope from 1998 until 31 May 2022.

Douglas Bogope, the youngest son of Monoge David Bogope became the new headman 0n June 1, 2022.

Lonaka Kgotla office is at plot 4450, Gabane.

Gabane Primary School, Nare Sereto Junior Secondary School, Gabane clinic, veterinary office and Gabane community home based care are some of the developments found in Lonaka ward.

Welkom Polka group led by Mr Kabelo Mmualefe, Bring Da Money social club, Gae Lame social club and Badirammogo society are some of the community associations found in Lonaka ward.

- List of cities in Botswana
