= Mokaragana =

- Genre: Music; Live performance; Entertainment
- Country of origin: Botswana
- Original languages: Setswana; English

Original release
- Network: Botswana Television (BTV)

Mokaragana is a live music performance television program broadcast on Botswana Television (BTV), the national broadcaster of Botswana. It is one of BTV's flagship local entertainment shows and airs on Saturday evenings. Unlike music video programs, Mokaragana features stage performances by local artists recorded before a live audience, making it a primary platform for Botswana musicians to reach a national television audience. BTV's signal is carried on satellite across several southern African countries, including South Africa, Namibia, Zambia, Lesotho, and Zimbabwe, giving the show a regional reach beyond Botswana's borders.

== Format ==
Mokaragana is a sponsored live music show in which local artists perform on a studio stage. The show's format emphasizes live performance rather than music video playback, distinguishing it from other BTV music programs such as Flava Dome. The show has historically attracted corporate sponsorship from local and regional companies. Sponsors have included Blue Crystal Sugar, Orange Botswana, and Golden Fruit.

== History ==
Mokaragana was among the earliest entertainment programs on BTV following the station's launch in July 2000. By the mid-2000s it had become one of the most popular shows on the channel, with large numbers of viewers both at home and at the live studio recording sessions. Its success attracted sustained corporate sponsorship, and the show became a coveted performance slot for Botswana musicians seeking national and regional exposure.

In mid-2006, BTV undertook a revamp of Mokaragana, replacing long-serving presenter Miso Mmereki; known as Mega-V, who had hosted the show for more than five years. Mmereki had previously been a Radio Botswana English newsreader and became one of BTV's most recognisable on-screen personalities. The revamp generated public and sponsor pushback: the show's sponsors, who had a long-term contract with the program, indicated their preference for Mmereki to continue, and had incorporated her in advertising campaigns for their products.

Presenter Joel Ntsoro Keitumile later became the most celebrated host in Mokaragana's history. Keitumile, who had originally joined BTV presenting a Sunday gospel program, was brought in as a stand-in on Mokaragana and subsequently became its principal host, taking the show to what the Botswana Youth Magazine described as "dizzy heights".

By 2013, the show's production values had declined and the format had remained largely unchanged, leading the Botswana Music Union (BOMU) to publicly call on BTV management to review the programme. BOMU secretary general Pagson Ntsie acknowledged that the show remained a valuable platform for cross-border exposure while calling for improvements in production quality and presenter standards. Later presenters of the show have included Girlie "Wa Di Body", who co-hosted the program during its Saturday evening slot.

== Significance ==
Mokaragana is cited alongside Flava Dome and Pula Power as one of BTV's three principal vehicles for promoting popular music to a national audience. Music In Africa has identified Mokaragana and Flava Dome as the primary television platforms through which live performance reaches Botswana's music audience, distinguishing them from talent competition formats such as My African Dream (MAD) and My Star3.

== See also ==
- Botswana Television
- Flava Dome
- Music of Botswana
