= 2021 Xumabee Game Ranch helicopter crash =

Aviation accident in Botswana

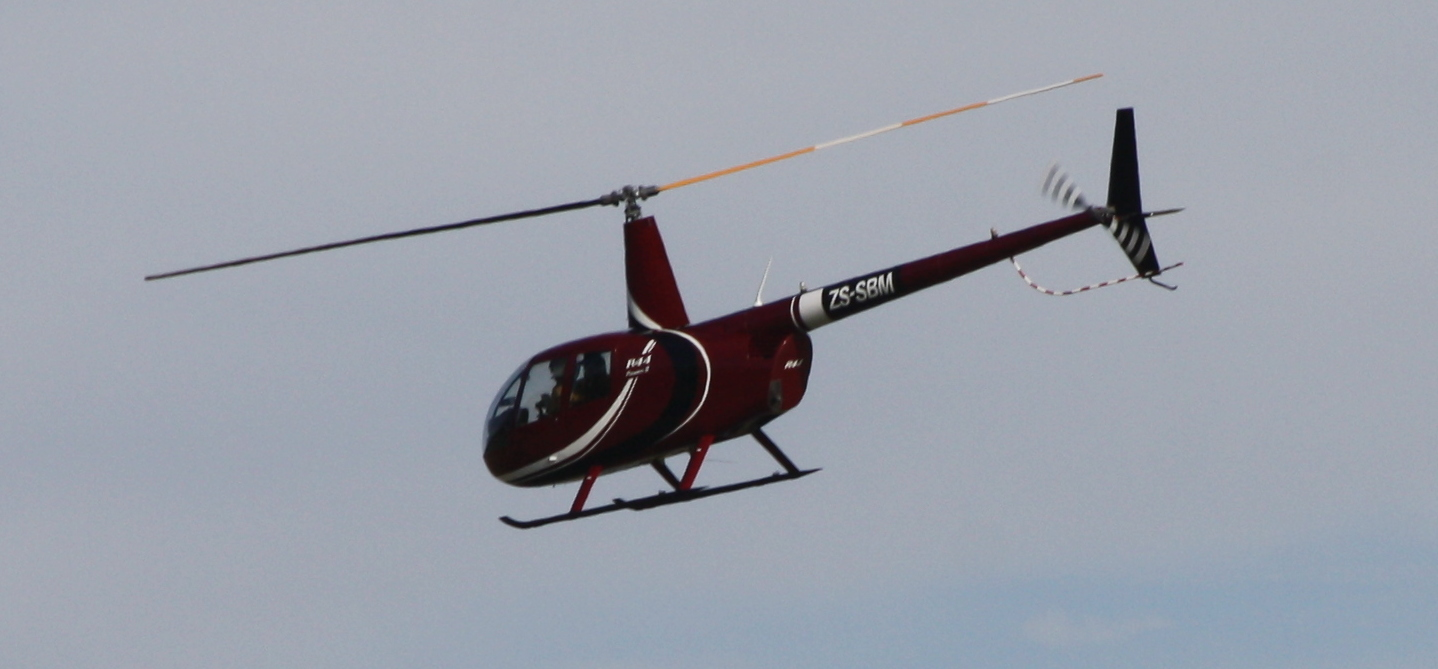
- ZS-SBM, the helicopter involved in the accident, photographed in 2015

Accident
- Date: 5 March 2021
- Summary: Crashed following tail rotor collision with terrain
- Site: Xumabee, Botswana; 23.4393°S 25.7516°E

Aircraft
- Aircraft type: Robinson R44 II
- Registration: ZS-SBM
- Flight origin: Matsieng Air Strip, Botswana
- Destination: Xumabee Game Ranch, Botswana
- Occupants: 2
- Passengers: 1
- Crew: 1
- Fatalities: 1
- Injuries: 1
- Survivors: 1

On 5 March 2021, a Robinson R44 helicopter crashed on the outskirts of Xumabee near Sojwe in Botswana. There were two people on board the R44: The pilot who survived, and Sasa Klaas, a Motswana musician, died while en route to hospital.

== Aircraft ==
The helicopter involved in the accident was a Robinson R44 II, with registration ZS-SBM. The helicopter was previously involved in a minor accident on 1 August 2015, that resulted in the left skid collapsing. The cause of that accident was the result of a student performing an autorotation landing with decaying rotor RPM.

== Investigation ==
The Ministry of Transport and Communications released a statement stating the Directorate of Accident Investigation in the ministry and the Civil Aviation Authority of Botswana (CAAB) had started to investigate the accident.

According to the final report released on 6 December 2021, by the Directorate of Accident Investigation in the ministry (DAI), the report stated that:

"The probable cause of this occurrence was the helicopter's tail rotor colliding with terrain and leading to the helicopter's crash."

The DAI also identified the following contributing factors:

- The helicopter was flying at a low altitude approximately at tree-top level with limited visibility due to the lack of natural lighting (i.e. approximately 1 hour after sunset). The pilot had probably experienced spatial disorientation with the possibility of being under the influence.
- The pilot had arrived late to the ranch, compounded by his habit of flying at night with another during training at Hover Dynamics where he was also aided by street lighting and other sources of light.
- The fact that the pilot had departed late in the afternoon from the airstrip contributed to his inexperience in flying solo at night with limited visual references.

== See also ==
- List of accidents and incidents involving helicopters
- List of fatalities from aviation accidents
