= Frank Lesokwane =

- Also known as: Franco
- Born: Frank Lesokwane; 5 May 1971 (age 55)
- Origin: Gabane, Botswana
- Genre: Rumba - Kwasa Kwasa
- Occupation: Singer-producer
- Years active: 2001-present
- Label: Franco and Afro Musica

Frank Lesokwane is a Motswana musician who is famously known as Franco. He is known for producing most Kwasa Kwasa hit songs. Frank is also known for being the leader of the Franco and Afro Musica band which is a well performing band in Botswana.

== Career ==
=== Ke lela le lona ===
Ke lela le lona is a tswana song dropped in 2001 by Franco, as the translation says "I am crying with you" the song was created to pass a message to the saddened people out there facing different kind of problems. After the release of the hit song "Ke lela le lona" Franco became one of the most successful artist back in 2001.

=== Sephiri se dule ===
Sephiri se dule is a tswana song by Franco meaning "the secret is out". He created this song more specially to pass a message to his fans that no matter what one does it won't stay in the dark forever, the song was created especially for those people who do bad deeds to inform them that it won't stay a secret forever; one day it will be visible to others about who you are. His song seems to have affected most of the corrupt politicians since they were against the song but later he clarified that this song was not released to make anyone feel bad about themself or that he is attacking them.

== Discography ==
- Ke lela le lona (2001)
- Ba ntatola (2002)
- Robala Nnana (2003)
- O nyala leng (2004)
- Mmamane Robala (2005)
- Khutsanyana (2006)
- Spekere (2007)
- Koti Koti (2008)
- Baesekele (2009)
- sephiri se dule (2011)
- maja ka thata (2012)
- Ke Fela Pelo (2013)
- Ke lorile sengwe (2014)
- Zeng zeng ke eng (2015)
- Eya le nna Babilone (2017)
- Mene Mene Tekele (2018)

== Awards ==
Frank Lesokwane received an award for being the best Kwassa kwassa artist of the year. He received this because he was the most motivating Kwasa kwasa artist of the year. Franco was being highly appreciated for being the first Motswana musician who has released most of his albums, with about 18 albums.
