= Yarona FM Music Awards YAMAs =

Yarona FM Music Awards
- YAMAs
- Awarded for: Achievement in Botswana music
- Country: Botswana
- Presented by: Yarona FM
- Website: yaronafm.co.bw

The Yarona FM Music Awards (YAMAs) are an annual music awards ceremony held in Gaborone, Botswana, organised by Yarona FM, a privately owned radio station that has operated as a youth-focused broadcaster in Botswana for over 25 years. Inaugurated in November 2014, the YAMAs recognise excellence across multiple categories in the Botswana music industry, determined through a combination of public voting and a panel of judges. The event is described as the highlight on the local music calendar.

== History ==
The inaugural Yarona FM Music Awards were held in November 2014 at a ceremony hosted by Yarona FM presenters Dollar Mac and Leungo. The event was attended by prominent figures from the Botswana music and entertainment industries and demonstrated, according to reviewers, that local artists could headline a major awards ceremony without reliance on international acts.

The second edition, styled YAMAs 2.0, was held on 12 December 2015. Performers at that edition included EPIC, Chrome, MMP Family, and Gaone.

By the fifth edition in 2019, themed Retro 5, the awards had grown from 15 categories at inception to 18 and received 68 entries. Yarona FM station manager Kelly Ramputswa described that edition as one centred on reflection, rebirth, and growth, and introduced a pre-ceremony artist workshop hosted by South African DJ and producer Oskido, aimed at helping artists develop personal brand architecture and sustainable businesses within the music industry.

The eighth edition, held in November 2023 at Molapo Crossing under the theme Drip to Infinity, introduced the Hall of Fame award, with the inaugural recipient being the late DramaBoi, an influential figure in the Motswako genre, with the award presented posthumously to his family. The ceremony was attended by the Minister of Youth, Gender, Sports and Culture, Tumiso Rakgare.

The ninth edition was held on 1 February 2025 at the Gaborone International Conference Centre (GICC), with the Okavango Diamond Company (ODC) as title sponsor.

== Format ==
Nominations are submitted as public entries and winners are determined through a combination of public voting across all mobile networks and adjudication by a panel of judges. The ceremony features live performances by nominated and invited artists alongside the awards presentations. A red carpet event precedes the ceremony.

=== Categories ===
Categories have grown since the inaugural edition. Recurring categories across multiple editions include:

- Artist of the Year
- Song of the Year
- Best Male Single
- Best Female Single
- Best Newcomer / Best New Artist
- Best Hip Hop
- Best Collabo
- Best DJ
- Best Social Media
- Best Producer
- Best Afro-Pop
- Best RnB Single
- Best Amapiano
- Best Botswana Pop
- ODC Diamond Award (from edition 8)
- Hall of Fame (from edition 8)

== Notable winners ==
=== Edition 1 (2014) ===
Category	Winner
Artist of the Year	Vee Mampeezy
Song of the Year	Vee Mampeezy – "Eita"
Best Female	Samantha Mogwe
Best Newcomer	PGB Linxsta
Best Hip Hop Artist	K-Bos
Best Hip Hop DJ	DJ Izzy (Tshephang Motsisi)
Best Social Media	Boggie Sid
Most Professional Artist	Zeus

=== Edition 8 (2023) ===
Category	Winner
Artist of the Year	Han C
Best Male Single	Han C
Best Afro-Pop	Han C
Best Newcomer	KX Legit
Best Hip Hop	KX Legit
Best Collabo	Day Cute
Best RnB Single	Danzel
Best Female Single	Kenso
Song of the Year	DJ Ngwazi – "Uthando"
Best Producer	Fela
ODC Diamond Award	KTM Choir

== See also ==
- Yarona FM
- Music of Botswana
- Botswana Music Awards
