= Glotto =

Glotto is a Botswana-based fashion brand co-founded by designer Mboko Basiami. The brand has been featured in local media coverage as part of Botswana's emerging fashion industry.

== History ==
Glotto was established in 2015 while Basiami was a student. The brand developed through local fashion showcases and digital platforms, gaining visibility within Botswana's creative sector. Basiami chose the name of the brand as a derivation of glottology, seeing parallels between the use of Botswana's different languages to connect its people and the use of local styles of fashion to represent Africa to the world.

In 2024, the brand launched SYNERGY, the company's first physical store. Glotto's team characterised the store opening as a means of expanding the brand's audience as it helps to redefine Botswana's creative space.

== Style and design ==
Media descriptions of Glotto highlight its focus on contemporary design influenced by African identity, incorporating minimalist aesthetics and themes of culture and environment, especially African landscapes. Basiami has described Pan Africanism and Afrofuturism key aeshetic influences in Glotto's designs.

== Recognition ==
Glotto has been listed as a notable Botswana fashion brands in local entertainment and fashion media and has participated in international fashion platforms. This included an appearance at 2023 New York Fashion Week, the first ever Botswana brand to be represented at one of the world's leading fashion shows.

That same year, Glotto was awarded an internship with the Mr. Price Group as a winner of the Fashion Without Borders' (FWB) Botswana competition. In 2024, Basiami participated on behalf of Glotto in a UNESCO-sponsored workshop intended to strengthen Botswana's creative sector.

== Role in the fashion industry ==
Glotto has been considered one of several key emerging Botswana fashion brands advancing the country's creative industries, particularly in youth-led design and digital fashion entrepreneurship. The brand is portrayed in local media as a vehicle for advancing Botswana innovation in fashion design to global audiences, alongside bestowing Botswanan youth with a sense of cultural pride in their clothing.

Glotto's leadership has described its clothing and accessories such as handcrafted jewelry as promoting Botswanan customers sense of "individuality, heritage and unapologetic self-expression".
