= Fashion in Botswana =

Overview of the fashion industry and clothing traditions of Botswana

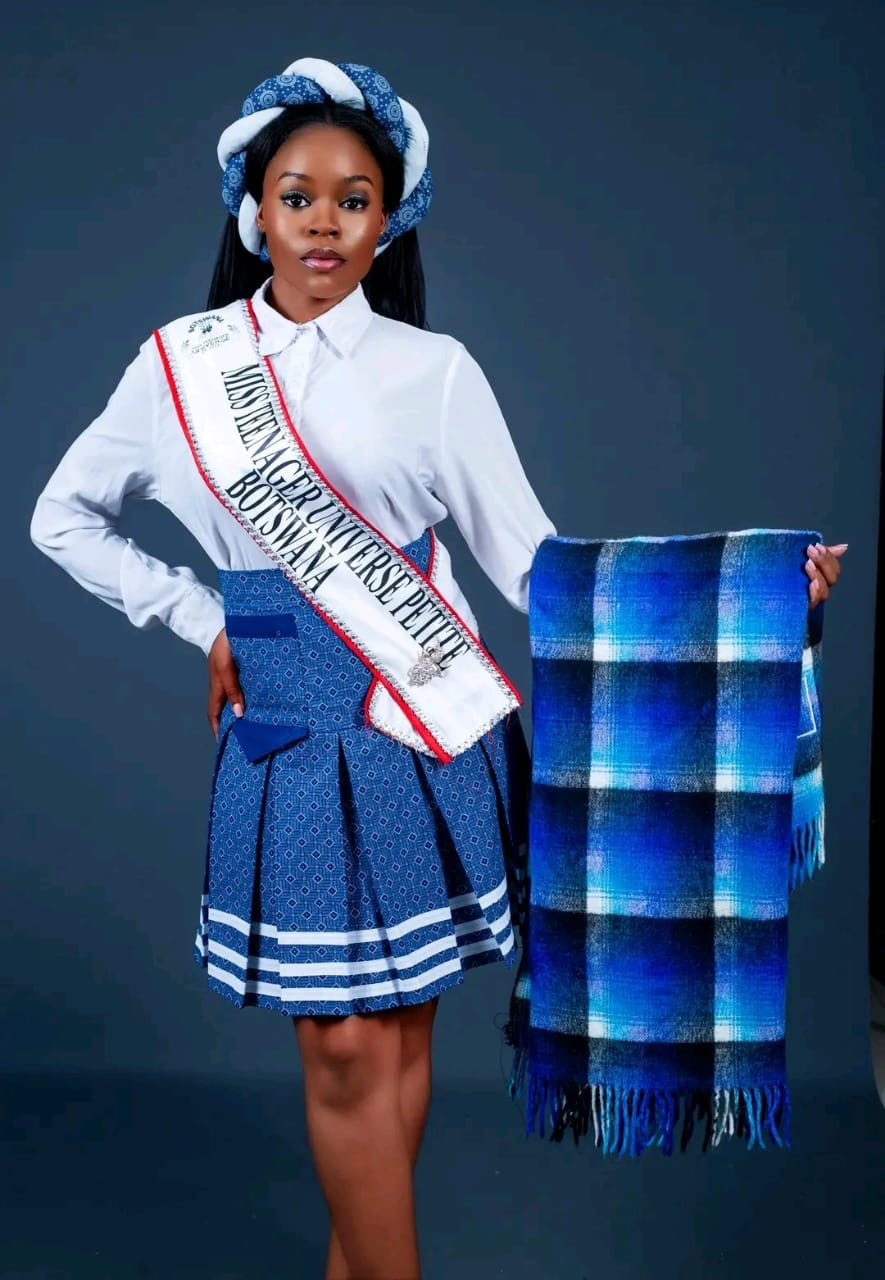
- Country: Botswana
- Traditional fabric: Leteisi (German print)
- Key designers: Mpho Kuaho; Mothusi Lesolle; BK Proctor; Christina Vanstaden
- Major events: Colour in the Desert Fashion Week(2011); Gaborone Fashion Weekend (2011); Express Yourself Fashion Gala (2023); Fashion Without Borders Africa
- Industry bodies: National Arts Council of Botswana (NACB)
- International milestones: Macy's Passport to DC (2017); AFI Fashion Week Johannesburg (2018); 72nd Miss World Festival (2025)

Fashion in Botswana is anchored in Leteisi fabric, which has been adopted across ethnic groups as the national traditional dress. A community of professional designers has developed since the early 2000s.

== Traditional dress and textile heritage ==
=== Pre-colonial attire ===
Before European contact, traditional Tswana dress for men consisted primarily of the tshega, a garment made from animal skins, worn around the loin. Women wore the dijale, along with draped animal skin coverings. Across the country's various ethnic groups, clothing was produced from locally available materials including animal hides, plant fibers, and woven textiles, with beadwork and decorative elements conveying social status and community identity.

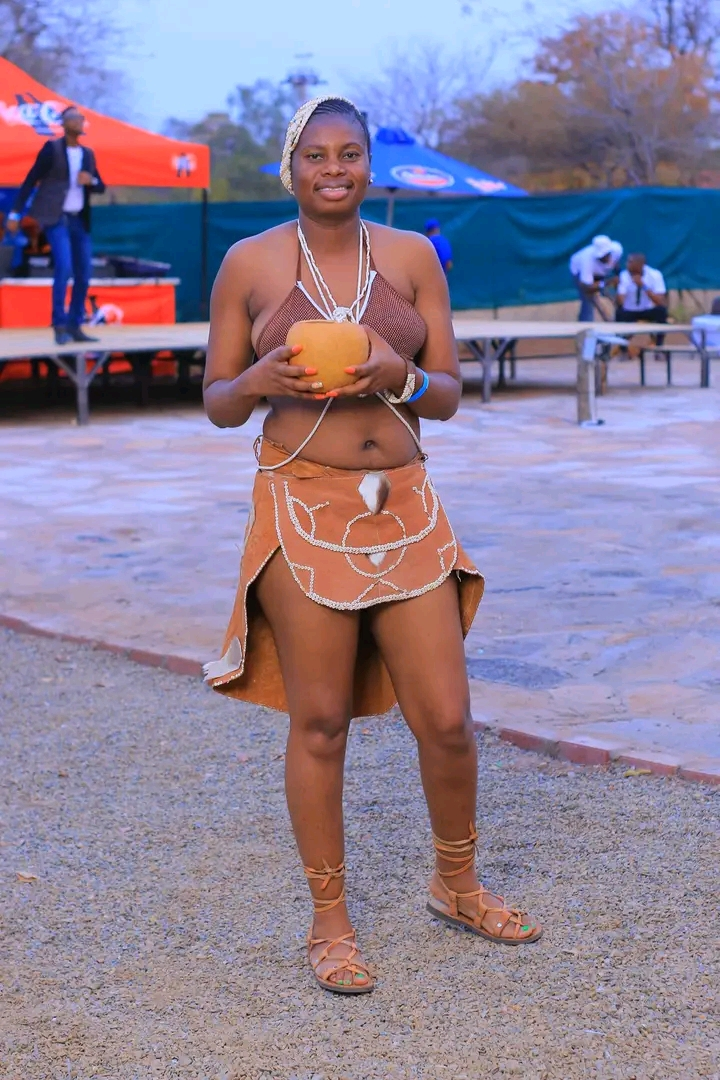
Tshega, a garment made from animal skins, worn around the loin

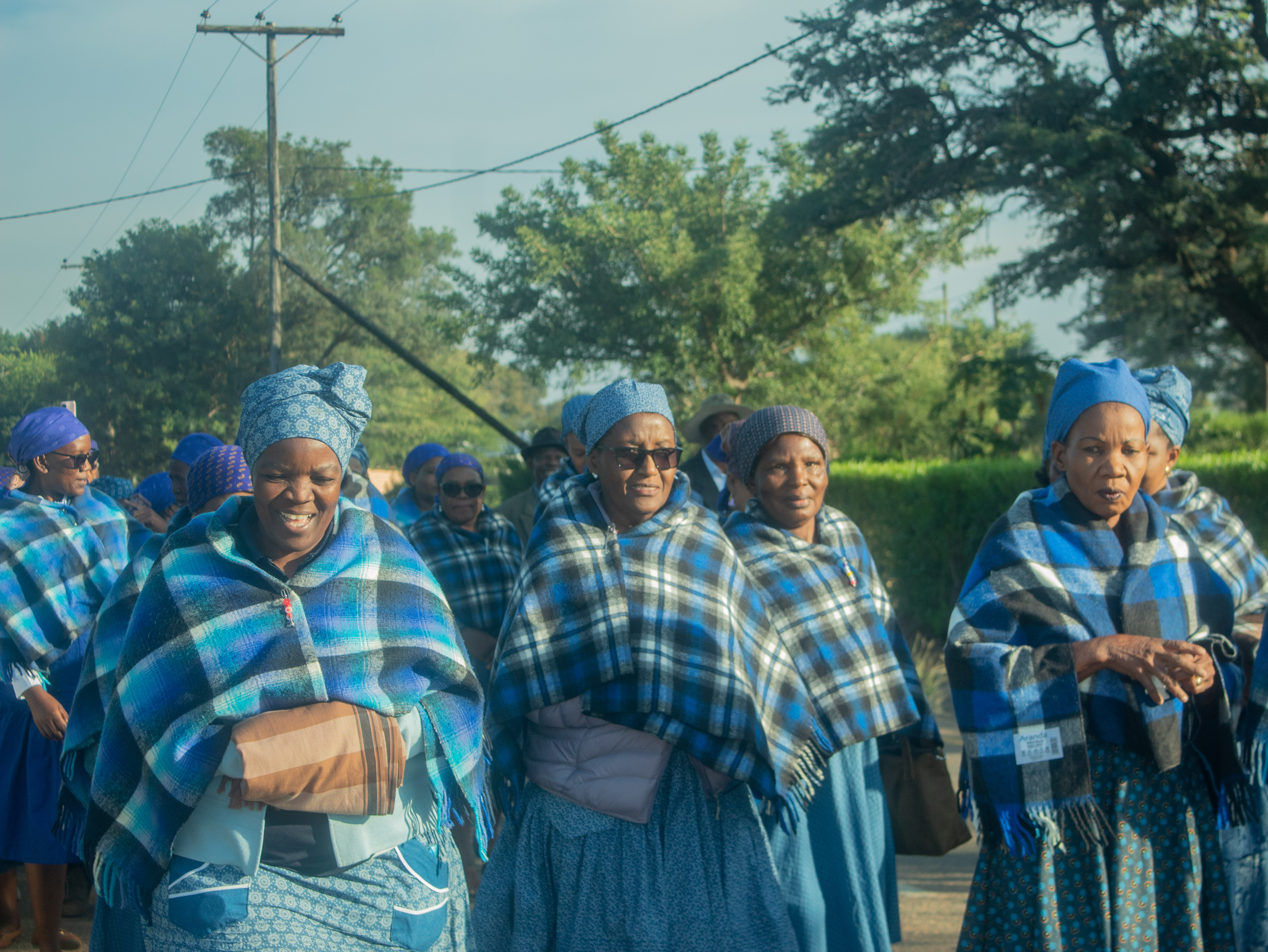
Patlo ceremony

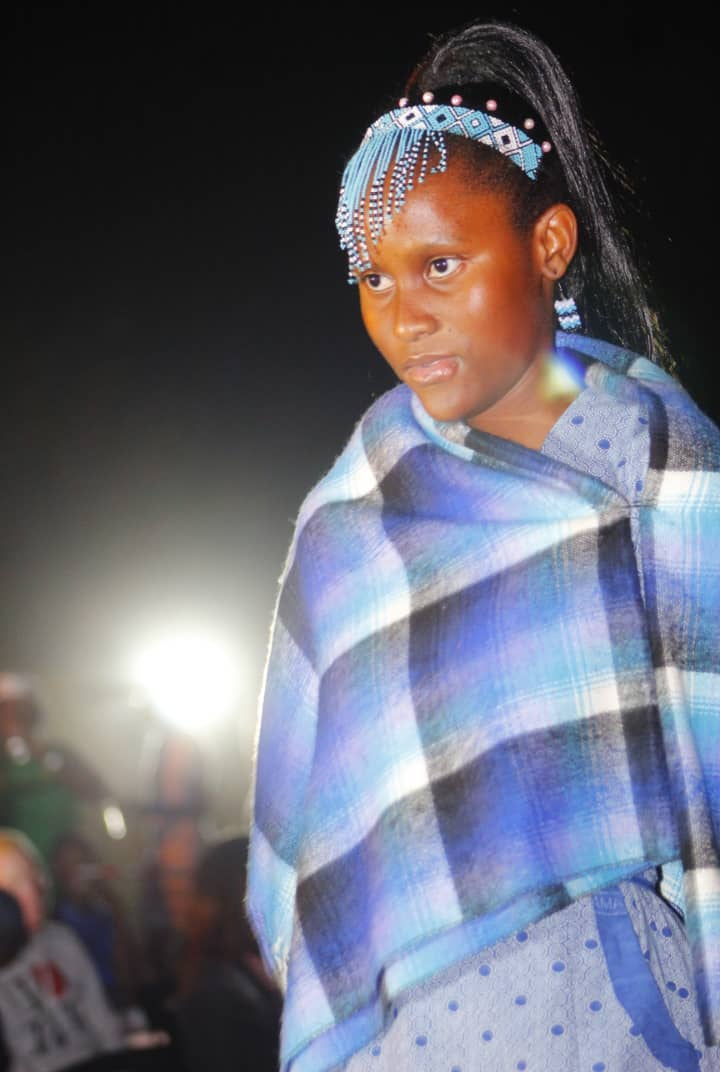
Tjale, along with draped animal skin coverings or leteisi.

The Herero and Mbanderu communities of Botswana have their own distinct dress tradition. Herero women wear full-length structured gowns called ohorokova, derived from the Victorian-era clothing imposed by German missionaries during the colonial period in what is now Namibia. The distinctive cow horn shaped headdress, known as otjikaiva, is worn alongside the gown as a symbol of respect and a reference to cattle as the foundation of Herero wealth. The ohorokova is simultaneously a marker of cultural identity and a reminder of the Herero genocide carried out by German colonial forces in the early twentieth century.

=== Leteisi ===
The most widely recognized textile in Botswana is leteisi (also spelled letoitse), a printed and dyed cotton fabric characterized by intricate geometric patterns. The fabric originated in Germany and spread to Botswana through South Africa, where German settlers introduced it to the Eastern Cape and Natal. Batswana adopted it through sustained cultural and commercial ties with South African communities.

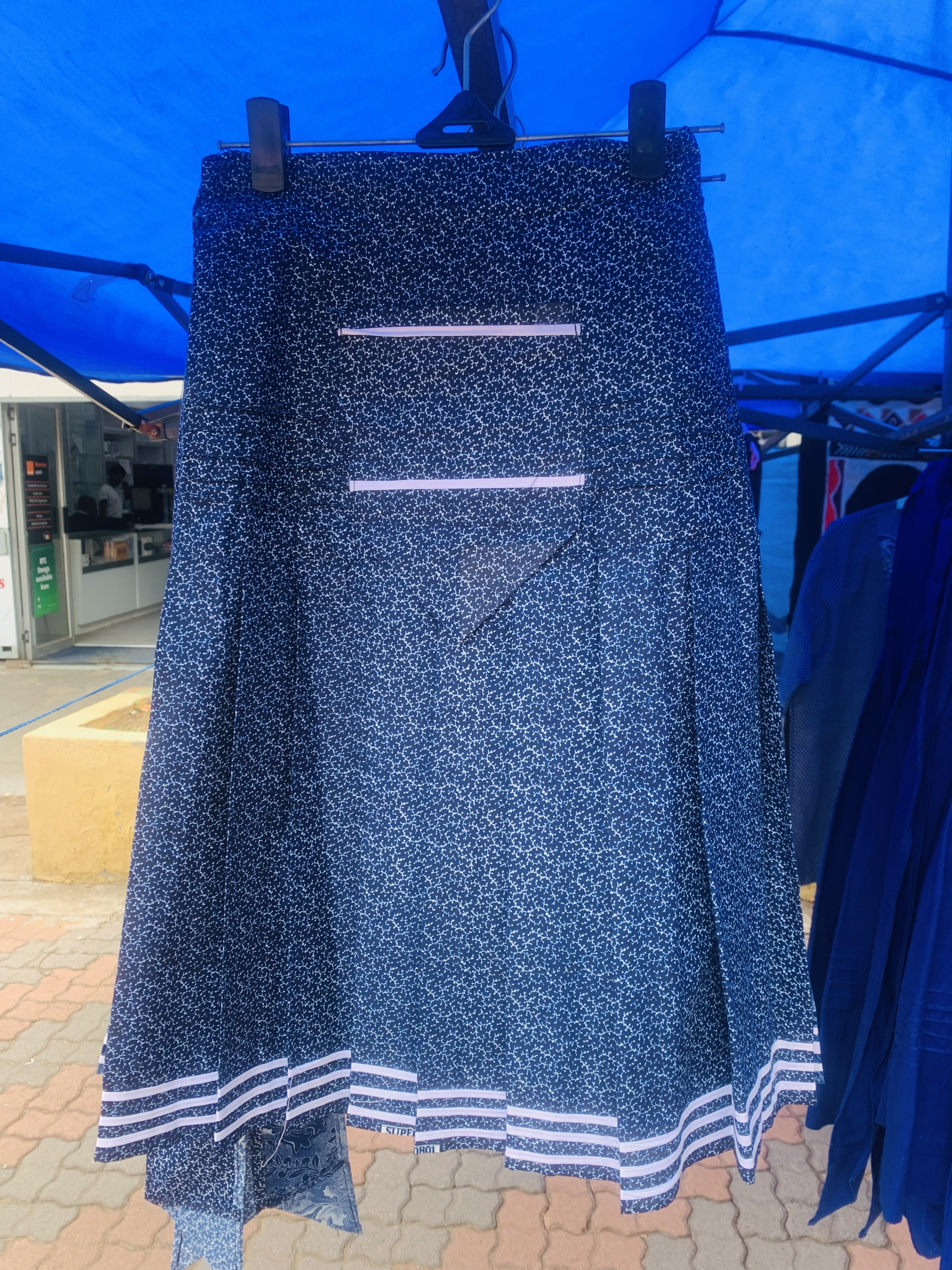
leteisi (also spelled letoitse), a printed and dyed cotton fabric characterised by intricate geometric patterns

Although it was initially associated primarily with Tswana ethnic groups including the Bakgatla and Bakwena, leteisi is now worn across all of Botswana's ethnic groups. The fabric is central to formal cultural occasions including weddings, the patlo ceremony, Kgotla meetings, and funerals. It is also the fabric worn by women at Parliament's official opening. Originally produced in indigo, it is now available in a wide range of colours and patterns, with every major town in Botswana having shops that stock it. Contemporary designers have fused leteisi with fabrics including silk, and have extended its use to menswear as well as women's clothing.

=== Colonial influence on dress ===
The British colonization of the Bechuanaland Protectorate in the late nineteenth century brought European clothing styles and fabrics including calico and velvet into Batswana communities. Missionaries, including women associated with figures such as Mary Moffat, actively promoted the adoption of Western dress, viewing it as aligned with their religious and civilizing mission. Tswana women were encouraged to adopt aprons and skirts as markers of new domestic roles. Tswana men adopted Western shirts and trousers, initially alongside traditional dress and later more broadly in everyday life.

Despite colonial pressure, traditional attire continued to be worn at ceremonies and cultural events, functioning as an expression of resilience and community identity. The post-independence period from 1966 onward saw renewed interest in traditional dress as part of national identity formation, with leteisi in particular becoming more widely celebrated as a symbol of Botswana's cultural heritage.

== Early industry development ==
Botswana's professional fashion design community began taking shape in the early 2000s, centered in Gaborone. For much of this period, local designers faced a structural barrier: clothing retail stores in Botswana predominantly stocked products from South African brands and gave little shelf space to local labels. Designers typically generated revenue through individual commissions, tenders, and fashion show invitations rather than through retail distribution.

Mpho Kuaho, founder of the label Jophes 09267, is one of the earliest figures to have worked professionally as a fashion designer in Botswana. Named by combining "Jophes," the nickname of her husband Joseph, with 09267, Botswana's international dialling code, the label encodes a deliberate statement of national identity. Kuaho studied clothing production in Mafikeng and completed a degree at the Linea Academy in Durban before returning to Gaborone. Her label produces womenswear, menswear, and accessories drawing on leteisi fabric and the traditional dibatha patchwork craft. In December 2006, she won first place in the Redds African Fashion competition, competing against designers from ten other countries. In 2007 she was preparing to work as assistant wardrobe designer on the BBC and HBO production of The No. 1 Ladies' Detective Agency.

== Fashion weeks and industry events ==
=== Colour in the Desert Fashion Week (2011) ===
The Colour in the Desert Fashion Week (CDFW), co-founded by Mpho Kuaho and producer Tsoseletso Magang in 2011, is regarded as the first formal fashion week in Botswana. The inaugural edition featured six designers and attracted international participants from Egypt, South Africa, Mozambique, and Kenya. Three of the six participating designers were subsequently invited to the Angola Fashion Business event, backed by the Angolan Ministry of Geology, Mining and Industry. CDFW was also invited to showcase at the Swahili Fashion Week in Tanzania. The 2011 edition was attended by VH1 stylist Indashio and American model Yaya DaCosta, and featured Tanzanian designer Mustafa Hassanali, who later credited his participation in CDFW with opening the door to his appearance at Swahili Fashion Week. The first edition received a rating of 8 out of 10 from local fashion observers, the highest of the new Botswana fashion events that debuted that year.

=== Gaborone Fashion Weekend (2011) ===
The Gaborone Fashion Weekend (GFW), founded by designer Koketso Chiepe, ran annually from at least 2011 and provided a platform specifically for young and emerging designers. Alongside CDFW, it is identified as one of two events that shaped the formation of a structured fashion industry in Botswana in the early 2010s. Chiepe's stated philosophy was to present clothing that could be worn directly off the runway, prioritizing commercial viability alongside creative presentation.

=== Fashion Without Borders Africa (from 2014) ===
Fashion Without Borders Africa (FWB Africa) is a pan-African fashion event that has included Gaborone in its annual calendar since its founding in 2014. The Botswana edition is held each October and regularly features both local and continental designers. Production for the Botswana edition is handled by Efigy Productions. By 2022, the event had reached its eighth annual edition across its three locations: Botswana, South Africa, and the Democratic Republic of Congo.

=== Express Yourself Fashion Gala (from 2023) ===
The Express Yourself Fashion Gala is an annual fashion event launched in December 2023 by lifestyle brand Collections by BK Proctor to mark its fifth anniversary. Held at the Grand Palm Resort in Gaborone, the event celebrates local creative expression and brings together designers, models, and entertainers from Botswana's fashion industry.

== International exposure ==
=== AFI Fashion Week Johannesburg (2018) ===
In 2018, the Ministry of Youth Empowerment, Sport and Culture sponsored five Botswana designers to participate in the African Fashion International (AFI) Fashion Week at Melrose Arch in Johannesburg, South Africa. The participating designers were Mothusi Lesolle of iZaura, Aobakwe Molosiwa of Gilded Sands, Lesedi Matlapeng of KefSeddy Designs, Sharon Taolo of Everyday Clothing, and Boitumelo Seboko of Rosetta Stone. Each designer presented a collection of ten pieces. Lesolle noted after the event that Elle magazine featured one of his outfits from the show.

=== Macy's Passport to DC (2017) ===
In April 2017, Mothusi Lesolle's leteisi two-piece dress Motlalepula (meaning "the rain bringer") was selected for display at Macy's Metro Centre in Washington DC as part of the retailer's Passport to DC initiative celebrating global fashion. Lesolle was one of two African designers selected for the program, with the other coming from Malawi. The selection came through the Botswana Embassy in the United States. The dress was on display from 14 April through mid-May 2017.

=== 72nd Miss World Festival (2025) ===
In May 2025, Lokieden Creations, a label founded by self-taught designer Christina Vanstaden from Werda, received international coverage when Miss World Botswana Anicia Gaothusi wore one of Vanstaden's designs as her arrival look at the 72nd Miss World Festival in Telangana, India. The look was reviewed by international fashion content creator I AM NDESHI.

== Notable fashion labels ==
Botswana's contemporary fashion industry has produced a number of labels with national and international profiles. Jophes 09267, founded by Mpho Kuaho, draws on leteisi fabric and dibatha patchwork and was active from the early 2000s. iZaura, founded by Mothusi Lesolle, has showcased at AFI Fashion Week and the Macy's Passport to DC program. Collections by BK Proctor, founded by BK Proctor, is a lifestyle label designing footwear, apparel, and accessories in Botswana and manufacturing across fourteen factories in Asia, with four stores across the country as of 2024. Lokieden Creations, founded by self-taught designer Christina Vanstaden, is known for its use of bold color and unconventional silhouettes and came to international attention through its association with Miss World Botswana 2025.

== Industry development programs ==
Créations Botswana was a fashion entrepreneurship program launched in September 2023, financed by the Embassy of France in Botswana and implemented by the Alliance Française Gaborone and the National Arts Council of Botswana (NACB), with support from the French creative hub La Halle Tropisme in Montpellier. The program supported 28 designers in two cohorts and provided each participant with grants between BWP 15,000 and BWP 50,000, alongside mentoring from international experts over several months. Its final events were held in Gaborone in July 2025, including a pitch competition at the Botswana National Museum judged by South African designer Rich Mnisi and a representative from ABSA.
