= Dato Seiko =

Botswana singer, songwriter

- Born: Katlego Ntirang
- Genres: Alternative; R&B; Soul
- Occupations: Singer; Songwriter; Film producer
- Years active: 2016–present
- Publisher: Warner Music Africa

Dato Seiko, born Katlego Ntirang, is a Motswana singer, songwriter and film producer based in Gaborone, Botswana. Describing herself as a genre-fluid musician, her work spans alternative, R&B and soul, drawing on personal experiences of love, identity and emotional resilience. She is the younger sister of kwaito artist Mapetla. She trained in film production at AFDA Botswana and uses her visual storytelling background to complement her musical output.

Her 2023 single The Vow was distributed through Warner Music Africa and generated over 44,000 user-created videos on TikTok collectively drawing more than 44.8 million views on the platform.

== Early life and career ==
Katlego Ntirang grew up in Gaborone in a musical family, and has described music as her primary means of emotional expression from childhood. She pursued formal training in film production at AFDA Botswana, a decision she has attributed to her belief that visual storytelling would enhance her ability to communicate through music. Prior to releasing her own material she collaborated with DJ Kuchi, co-writing and recording a song for the SKY Girls BW teenage empowerment campaign.

She performed at the Multichoice Talent Factory launch in Zambia in the early stages of her career, and later performed at the President's Concert in Botswana on two consecutive occasions. She has also performed alongside artists Mpho Sebina and Thato Jessica in South Africa.

== Discography ==
=== Grace Effect (2021) ===
Dato Seiko released her debut extended play, Grace Effect, on 7 May 2021 through Oasis Studio Africa. The six-track project was five years in the making, with the title drawn from the biblical significance of the number five as a symbol of grace. The EP features collaborations with Mpho Sebina on the track "Moonstone" and Thato Jessica on "Oh No". Other tracks include "Hurda", "Lunathi", "Kaone Kario" and "Sapiosexual".

The EP reached the top of the Apple Music Alternative charts in Botswana and received coverage in international music publications including Tha Native magazine.

=== Singles ===
In 2023, Dato Seiko released "The Vow", which she has described as originating from a personal affirmations exercise in which she imagined the words she would want spoken to her at a wedding. The song went viral on TikTok and was subsequently distributed through Warner Music Africa.

In 2024, she released "Sahasrara", a track whose title is drawn from the Sanskrit term for the crown chakra. The song addresses the emotional distance that can develop within a deep friendship, and was described by the artist as a soft diss track rooted in her belief in karma rather than retaliation.

== Live performances ==
In November 2021, Dato Seiko performed an emotional cover of DJ Zinhle's hit Umlilo at Avani Gaborone Resort & Casino during a live event also featuring DJ Zinhle. The performance visibly moved DJ Zinhle, who commented that she should consider recording a song in Botswana.

In November 2025, she announced a solo show titled The Healing Point at Maitisong theatre in Gaborone. The show was conceived as the conclusion of a thematic trilogy spanning the experiences of loving, losing and healing.
