= Mboko Basiami =

Fashion designer and business woman

Mboko Basiami is a Motswana fashion designer and entrepreneur. She is the founder of the Botswana-based fashion brand Glotto, known for contemporary designs that draw on themes of African identity and minimalism.

== Early life and education ==
Basiami is from Sebina, Botswana. She developed an early interest in fashion, influenced by family members involved in clothing and retail. She studied Business at the University of Botswana.

== Career ==
Basiami founded Glotto in 2015 while still a student, but officially established it as a business in 2018. The brand developed through local showcases and digital platforms, gaining visibility within Botswana’s fashion and creative industries.

Her work has been described in media coverage as design-led, incorporating minimalist aesthetics and themes influenced by African landscapes, culture, and identity.

== Recognition ==
Basiami's work through Glotto has been featured in discussions of Botswana's emerging fashion sector. The brand has also been associated with international fashion platforms, including participation linked to New York Fashion Week and most recently Paris Fashion Week.

== See also ==
- Fashion in Botswana
- Glotto
