= Dikhwaere =

Dikhwaere (singular: khwaere) is a traditional Setswana choral music and dance genre practiced in Botswana. It encompasses both the performing ensemble and the repertoire of songs associated with communal celebrations, particularly during the festive season. The genre is most strongly associated with the Kgatleng region and other southern parts of the country, where choirs have performed competitively for generations. The Dikopelo Folk Music of Bakgatla ba Kgafela, the closely related tradition of the Bakgatla ba Kgafela community, has been recognised by UNESCO as an element of intangible cultural heritage.

== Etymology and terminology ==
The word khwaere is a loanword adopted into the Setswana language, derived from the English word choir. The plural form, dikhwaere, serves as a generic term for both the singing and dancing group and the musical genre itself.

Two Setswana synonyms exist for dikhwaere: medikano and dikopelo. Medikano can also refer separately to evening entertainment involving song and dance performed by young people after their daily chores, either in single-sex or mixed groups. Dikopelo translates directly as "singing sessions". The term Dikopelo Folk Music of Bakgatla ba Kgafela is used specifically in the context of the Bakgatla ba Kgafela community's heritage designation.

== Characteristics ==
=== Performance format ===
A dikhwaere group; called a khwaere, performs a combination of live choral singing and choreographed dance. Expressive choreography is a defining feature of the genre: the accompanying movement is expected to match the mood of the song, ranging from lively and energetic movement to express celebration or excitement, to gently swaying motions conveying solemnity. Audiences at live dikhwaere events traditionally hold sticks as part of communal participation.

=== Lyrical themes ===
The themes of dikhwaere music are understood to reflect the awareness of communities to prevailing social, political, and economic conditions at any given time. Competition songs are typically composed in accordance with a given theme, which may address issues of community life, national affairs, or broader world events. This thematic responsiveness is considered an expression of the composer's level of social consciousness.

=== Seasonal and geographic context ===
Dikhwaere events are most prominent during the festive season; particularly around Christmas Day, Boxing Day, and New Year's Day, when communities traditionally gather for communal celebration. The traditional venue for dikhwaere performances is at the lands (farmstead areas), as the festive season coincides with the summer ploughing season in Botswana. The genre is particularly well established in the southern parts of the country, with the Kgatleng region home to a dense concentration of active choirs and competitive events.

== Competitions ==
=== President's Day Arts Competition ===
Since the introduction of the President's Day Arts Competition, dikhwaere has become a competitive pursuit offering monetary prizes. Unlike some other categories in the competition; such as traditional instruments and songs, dikhwaere groups are required to compose their competition songs specifically within the confines of the competition's given annual theme. The competition has been credited with raising public awareness of dikhwaere as a form of cultural expression capable of generating economic returns.

Notable past winners include the Mahusane Choir of Kang, which won the 2013 President's Day Arts Competition finals. Mahusane's winning song addressed the capacity of artistic ability to create employment and reduce dependency on government support.

=== Okanyatsa Dikhwaere Challenge ===
The Okanyatsa Dikhwaere Challenge is an independent competitive event held in the Kgatleng region. Founded in 2016 by the Okanyatsa Choir, the competition began with two participating choirs with a prize of P1,800 and grew to include five or more choirs with a total prize pool of P15,000 by 2018. Participating choirs at the 2018 edition included Sedibelo, London, Badiragatsi, Bodiakhudu, and Makgatlheng, all from the Kgatleng District. Badiragatsi also known as Marema ka Chaka; won the 2018 edition and received a floating trophy and P5,000. The event attracted the participation of a researcher from the University of Botswana Department of Archaeology whose mandate included documenting dikhwaere events as part of an ongoing research and heritage inventory effort.

== UNESCO recognition and heritage status ==
The Dikopelo Folk Music of Bakgatla ba Kgafela, the dikhwaere tradition associated with the Bakgatla ba Kgafela community, has been recognised as an element of intangible cultural heritage by UNESCO.

Botswana's National Intangible Cultural Heritage Committee has identified dikhwaere as falling within the domain of performing arts under the UNESCO 2003 Convention for the Safeguarding of the Intangible Cultural Heritage. Experts have flagged tensions between heritage preservation and commercialisation: as dikhwaere events attracted corporate sponsorship and tourism interest, entry prices at some events rose in ways that restricted community access, potentially weakening the conditions under which the tradition is transmitted between generations.

== Contemporary practice ==
Beyond competition events, dikhwaere choirs perform at cultural festivals and community celebrations throughout Botswana. The Madikwe Cultural Festival in Sikwane, Kgatleng; listed on the Botswana Tourism Organisation calendar of events, has regularly featured dikhwaere as a centrepiece. The festival, named after the Madikwe River that runs along the Botswana–South Africa border in the east of the country, positions dikhwaere within a broader program celebrating the culture of the Bakgatla ba Kgafela river villages.

== Notable associated musicians ==
Dr Vom (Kangangwani Mogocha) is widely regarded as the pre-eminent contemporary recording artist in the dikhwaere genre. His 2007 song "Tsaya Thobane" became a fixture at national sporting and cultural events, attaining the status of an unofficial national anthem in Botswana. Other notable traditional music acts associated with dikhwaere events include Moologa, Mmaratwa, and Matlotla.

== See also ==
- Music of Botswana
- Setswana language
