= Khoisan (duo) =

Afro-fusion duo from Gaborone

- Origin: Gaborone, Botswana
- Genres: Afro fusion
- Years active: 2018–present
- Label: Roc Lefatshe Records
- Members: Thabang Rasefako; Oratile Kofa
- Past members: Mosimanegape Mosweu; Olerato Kennetseng; Nita Lempaletse

Khoisan is a Motswana Afro fusion duo from Gaborone, Botswana, consisting of Thabang Rasefako and Oratile Kofa. Originally formed in December 2018 as a five-member group under Roc Lefatshe Records, the group reduced to a duo following internal restructuring. They are known for blending modern and traditional African sounds and their singles include Marabele, Sethubuge, Sananpopo, and Mpoledise.

== Formation ==
Khoisan was formed in December 2018 when five musicians, Mosimanegape Mosweu, Thabang Rasefako, Olerato Kennetseng, Oratile Kofa, and Nita Lempaletse, were brought together through an audition by producer Suffocate of Roc Lefatshe Records. The group's sound was described as a modern Afro-fusion blend with strong traditional African influences, delivering messages aimed at uplifting and healing listeners.

Within three months of formation, the original five-member lineup experienced internal disagreements that led to a restructuring. The group reduced to two members , Rasefako and Kofa; through a mutual agreement between the members and the label. The duo retained the Khoisan name and musical rights to subsequent recordings, with only the debut single Marabele being attributed to the original five-member lineup.

== Career ==
Khoisan secured a publishing deal with South African record label Muthaland for their debut single Marabele, which also received airplay on Mafikeng FM in South Africa's North West province. The group toured the North West province shortly after the deal was announced.

As a duo, Rasefako and Kofa continued to release music through Roc Lefatshe Records, including singles Sethubuge and Sananpopo. Their 2021 single Mpoledise became one of the most widely heard tracks in Botswana that year, with the duo noting that its themes of comfort and resilience resonated with listeners during the COVID-19 pandemic, though the song had not been composed in response to the pandemic.

The duo was selected to perform at the FNB Africa Day concert through a public voting process in which Botswana voted for artists they wished to see represent the country on the continental platform. They were paired with the Mophato Dance crew for the performance.

Khoisan has also performed at the Yarona FM Music Awards (YAMAs) and the Miss Botswana beauty pageant. At the time of their 2021 YAMA nominations, the duo held two nominations at the YAMAs and four at the Botswana Outstanding Music Awards (BOMUs).

The group has featured on the South African television channel Mzansi Magic's Afropop Nation program.

== Discography ==
=== Singles ===
- Marabele (2018) debut single, featuring the original five-member lineup
- Sethubuge
- Sananpopo
- Mpoledise (2021)
