= Franco and Afro Musica =

Motswana band

- Origin: Gabane, Botswana
- Genres: Kwasa kwasa
- Instruments: Guitar (esp. fingerstyle); bass (esp. acoustic); drums; brass; vocals

Franco and Afro Musica is a twelve piece kwasa kwasa band from Gabane, Botswana.

The band was founded by Frank "Franco" Lesokwane. As is the norm in the soukous (Congolese rumba) circles for artists to go by more than one names, Lesokwane also goes by several other names like Stango, Molamu, Lepako and Chakala. After playing and providing vocals for other leading Kwasa kwasa bands in Botswana, Franco, together with Tanzanian born lead guitarist, Shabani Mwanasande Yohana, formed the band and started touring the country. They recruited other soukous experts and recorded their first album, Ke lela le lona, which loosely translates to "I am crying with you". Other members of Afro Musica are DannyBass Dikole Gasebatho (bass guitar), Oxy Oxygen Ntoko (Drum), Samurai Ngingo (lead guitar).

After Ke lela le lona the band has produced albums annually. The band released their most popular single Tshutshumakgala (a tswana name for a train), which won them their first Botswana Music Union (BOMU) Award. This is a song about how much they fear the train. The songs are usually about controversial issues in the society like witchcraft, promiscuity and death. They tend to write material that is very personal and in each album, the band has at least one song that tells a story about a certain village in Botswana, which has earned them a good following. The band has won several awards, including the BOMU "Best Kwasa Kwasa Album of the Year" two years in a row.

However, in his first ever music video for his new album Mmamane Robala, Lesokwane, does not feature his back-up band or dancers, especially in interviews and behind the scene footage and he is unapologetic about it. "I gave them publicity on my cassette and CDs, what more do people want. I have written about those guys on my album sleeves. " I do not think it was so important to feature them in the video," said Franco, when asked why the band did not receive the same exposure he gave himself in the video. "We did not see it necessary to do so. People will talk as they always do, but it is up to the management to decide these things. Maybe Afro Musica will appear in the next video.

In April 2005, the band supported Koffi Olomide in his African tour. Koffi was quoted as saying "I am shocked to learn that the standards of the rhumba music in the country are this high."

== Discography ==
- Ke lela le lona (2001)
- Ba ntatola (2002)
- Robala Nnana (2003)
- O nyala leng (2004)
- Mmamane Robala (2005)
- Khutsanyana (2006)
- Spekere (2007)
- Koti Koti (2008)
- Baesekele (2009)
- sephiri se dule (2011)
- maja ka thata (2012)
- Ke Fela Pelo (2013)
- Ke lorile sengwe (2014)
- Zeng zeng ke eng (2015)
- Eya le nna Babilone (2017)
- Mene Mene Tekele (2018)

== Awards ==
- Best kwasa kwasa album of the year (2 years in a row).
