= Boko Yout =

Swedish music group

Boko Yout is a Swedish music group. Previously, the group's singer Paul Adamah, born 1998 in Örebro, used the name Boko Yout as a stage name for his solo project, but since 2025 Boko Yout became a group with the addition of Kevin Stierne on bass and Joel Kiviaho on drums.

== Solo project ==
Adamah grew up in Örebro but moved to Stockholm after high school. In 2016, he won the rap competition Nästa Nivå. He studied at the Royal Swedish Academy of Fine Arts in Stockholm but took a break from his studies to focus on music. His father is from Togo whilst his mother is from Mozambique, from whom he often draws inspiration in his work. At the beginning of his music career Adamah made hip-hop but felt that the genre limited him and found a role model in Swedish musician Broder John, appearing on Broder John's 2021 album Drift.

After collaborating with Broder John, Adamah took the step towards a more personal artistry and made his solo debut with the EP As Seen On TV. He calls his genre Afro-grunge. The EP led to him being named Newcomer of the Year at the Swedish music award gala, Manifest Gala, nominated for Newcomer of the Year at the 2024 Grammis Gala and Breakthrough of the Year at the GAFFA Prize. At the 2025 P3 Gold Awards Gala he was nominated in the category Artist of the Future. In 2024 Adamah worked with producer Bård “boerd” Ericson and released the joint EP “Griot”.

== Music group ==
In 2025, Boko Yout went from being Paul Adamah's solo project to becoming a group. Band members include Kevin Stierne on bass and Joel Kiviaho, son of musician Heikki Kiviaho, on drums. In 2025, the band released their debut album Gusto, which is inspired by the West African tradition of Vodún and it's concept of Zangbetos, as well as Jungian psychology. In an interview with Schon! Magazine Adamah described the album as "about confronting my shadows — everything I try to avoid within myself, [...] Shadows aren’t evil; they prove that light exists. This record is about meeting life with passion, enthusiasm, and intention.” In the same year they toured with fellow Swedish band Viagra Boys.
