= Dr Vom =

- Born: Kangangwani Mogocha; 1977 (age 48–49); Dakwi, North East District, Botswana
- Origin: Tati Siding, Botswana
- Genres: Afropop, Dikhwaere
- Occupations: Singer; Songwriter
- Years active: 1990s–present

Dr Vom, real name Kangangwani Mogocha (born 1977), is a Motswana singer and songwriter from Tati Siding in the North East District of Botswana. He is widely regarded as the country's foremost practitioner of Dikhwaere, a traditional Setswana music genre, and is best known for his 2007 song "Tsaya Thobane", which has attained the status of an unofficial national anthem at sporting and cultural events across Botswana.

== Early life ==
Kangangwani Mogocha was born in 1977 at Dakwi in the North East District, a region not associated with Dikhwaere music. He grew up at Tati Siding. Despite his origins in the North East, his music became so associated with central Botswana's cultural traditions that many listeners assumed he came from areas such as Kgatleng, Molepolole, or Sefhophe.

== Career ==
=== Afropop and early recordings ===
Mogocha began his career as an Afropop singer, releasing music under the stage name Vomit. His early recordings included the song "Matshediso", which brought him national radio airplay. By 2006 he had rebranded himself as Dr Vom, stating publicly that he wanted the new name to reflect a more considered artistic identity. Around the same time he described his evolving approach to songwriting, explaining that he had become more deliberate about the lyrical content of his material and his public presentation.

=== Dikhwaere and Tsaya Thobane ===
Although Dr Vom had established a following as an Afropop artist, his turn toward Dikhwaere; a traditional genre rooted in Setswana cultural practice, performed with sticks and associated with communal celebration, brought him his most enduring recognition. His 2007 song "Tsaya Thobane", which draws on imagery of traditional law and communal solidarity, rapidly became a fixture at national sporting events. The song became particularly associated with the Botswana national football team, the Zebras, with supporters singing it at matches.

The song features traditional music artist Ditiro Leero, to whom Dr Vom has attributed significant creative credit, noting that Leero rarely received comparable public recognition for his contribution.

=== Rangers Marena collaboration ===
A long-running creative partnership between Dr Vom and the Rangers Marena Choir from Artesia began in 2007, when the two parties met at the National Stadium in Gaborone during a football match between Mochudi Centre Chiefs and Township Rollers. The collaboration shaped the direction of Dr Vom's subsequent recordings. The choir contributed both backing performance and original composition: the song "Tshaba Di Maketse" was written by Rangers Marena. The music video for "Tsaya Thobane" was shot in Artesia with the choir.

By 2017 the partnership had extended across at least a decade. Dr Vom described the relationship as built on trust, loyalty, and mutual commitment, and stated that both he and Rangers Marena declined outside collaboration offers in order to maintain it.

=== Discography highlights ===
Dr Vom released his work across multiple albums, with the compilation Vomit vs Diparo containing "Tsaya Thobane". His eighth album, Tlhabano, co-produced with Rangers Marena Choir, was announced in 2017 and included the title track, a song addressing children's respect for their parents, as well as the single "Mi Nigga Wasup", which blended English lyrics with traditional music elements. Around 2011, Dr Vom explored gospel music, though he continued to perform Dikhwaere.

== Live performances ==
Dr Vom has become known for an ability to dominate events across Botswana regardless of whether he was originally scheduled to appear. At the 50T050 event in Gaborone city centre in 2016, a celebration of Botswana's 50th year of independence, he was spotted backstage by promoter Zenzele Hirschfield and brought onstage without appearing on the original programme. The crowd sang along to the full performance of "Tsaya Thobane", after which the Gaborone District Commissioner called for an encore and led a group of attendees on a 5-kilometre march while singing the song.

Similar scenes were documented at the Botswana Land Board & Local Authorities & Health Workers Union (BLLAHWU) Heritage Night at Boipuso Hall in 2019, at the Son of the Soil cultural event at Staywell Gardens in Rasesa in 2020, and at the Hika La Ngwanyana Cultural Festival in April 2024, where audiences arrived holding sticks and branches in anticipation of the song's performance.
