= Boko, Senegal =

Boko
- Location in Senegal
- Coordinates: 12°46′30″N 16°45′20″W
- Country: Senegal
- Region: Ziguinchor
- Department: Bignona
- Arrondissement: Kataba
- Rural community: Kafountine

Population (2002)
  - Total: 393
- Time zone: UTC+0 (GMT)

Boko is a settlement in Bignona Department of Ziguinchor Region in the Basse Casamance area of south-west Senegal.

In the 2002 census its population was 393 inhabitants in 55 households.
