= El Boco Airport =

Airport in Valparaíso Region, Chile

- IATA: none; ICAO: SCQL

Summary
- Airport type: Public
- Serves: Quillota, Chile
- Elevation AMSL: 459 ft / 140 m
- Coordinates: 32°51′05″S 71°14′40″W

Map
- Location of El Boco Airport in Chile

Runways
Direction	Length		Surface
Direction	m	ft	Surface
02/20	500	1,640	Grass
- Source: Landings.com Google Maps GCM

El Boco Airport (Spanish: Aeropuerto El Boco), (ICAO: SCQL) is an airport serving Quillota, a city in the Valparaíso Region of Chile. The airport is 3 kilometres (1.9 mi) north of the city.

The runway has 100 metres (330 ft) of grass overrun on the north end. There is high terrain nearby to the northwest. The Ventanas VOR-DME (Ident: VTN) is 14.3 nautical miles (26.5 km) west-northwest of the airport.

== See also ==
- Transport in Chile
- List of airports in Chile
