= Matsieng =

Botswana traditional music trio

- Genres: Vocal music Instrumental music Traditional music
- Years active: 2005–present
- Label: Eric Ramco Records
- Members: Liki 'Maeras' Tselabe Daniel Tsankane

Matsieng is a Setswana traditional music trio formed in 2005 in Gaborone, Botswana. They burst into the scene with their 2005 festive season album, Semakaleng. Known for their explicit lyrics, the trio has toured Botswana, Malaysia and South Africa.

Their earliest album, Setswana Sa Borre, has topped charts locally and enjoys airplay in the neighbouring South Africa, driven by their most explicit song, Tinto song. Two of the boys are natives of Gabane and one is from Kanye.

== Discography ==
=== Albums ===
- Setswana Sa Bo Rre (released 2007)
- Semakaleng (released 2009)
- #Matsieng2020 (released 2020)
