= Sadi Dikgaka =

Boipelo Sadi Dikgaka
- Born: Boipelo Sadi Dikgaka; Molepolole, Botswana
- Citizenship: Motswana
- Occupations: Television presenter; Social media influencer; Entrepreneur
- Years active: 2010s–present
- Known for: Flava Dome (BTV)

Boipelo Sadi Dikgaka, is a Motswana television presenter, social media influencer, and entrepreneur. She is best known as a co-host of Flava Dome, a music and entertainment program broadcast on Botswana Television (BTV), which she has presented alongside Loungo "King Bee" Pitse.

Her professional name Sadi derives from the Setswana word mosadi, meaning woman.

== Early life ==
Dikgaka is originally from Molepolole and grew up in Palapye. She describes herself as proud of her Setswana cultural roots, citing the Dithubaruba cultural event as one of her favourite occasions. She was a shy child who developed a love for performing arts during primary school. Her family had a strong musical background: her grandmother sang in a church choir and her sisters participated in Sunday school choirs.

She secured her presenting role on Flava Dome after responding to a casting advertisement that aired during the show itself, and impressed the selection panel.

== Career ==
=== Television ===
Dikgaka became one of the most recognizable faces in Botswana entertainment through her co-hosting role on Flava Dome, BTV's flagship music program. The show airs in primetime and features performances by local and regional artists. Her co-presenter Loungo Pitse has been described in press coverage as her regular on-screen partner.

=== Live performance ===
In April 2019 Dikgaka staged A Night With Sadi at the Maitisong Festival in Gaborone, a solo performance directed by Tefo Paya in which she presented her skills in singing and poetry to a live audience. The show was described by Mmegi as Dikgaka coming into her own as a performer beyond television, having previously shared the stage with Kalanga balladeer Lizibo.

=== Entrepreneurship and social media ===
Alongside her television work, Dikgaka has built a profile as a social media influencer and entrepreneur. She was among a cohort of Botswana-based female influencers featured at the inaugural Gabs Power Circle event in January 2022, a lifestyle event that brought together local influencers and South African counterpart Faith Nketsi. She has been involved in hosting duties at events including the Express Yourself Fashion Gala (2024).
