= Anna Mokgethi =

Motswana politician

Minister of Nationality, Immigration and Gender Affairs
- In office 6 November 2019 – 1 November 2024
- President: Mokgweetsi Masisi
- Preceded by: Dorcas Makgato-Malesu
- Succeeded by: Pius Mokgware

Member of the National Assembly for Gaborone Bonnington North
- In office 5 November 2019 – 5 September 2024
- Preceded by: Duma Boko
- Succeeded by: Maipelo Mophuting

Personal details
- Party: Botswana Democratic Party
- Children: Sasa Klaas
- Profession: Politician

Anna Maria Mokgethi is a Motswana politician who served as the Minister of Nationality, Immigration and Gender Affairs from November 2019 to November 2024. She was the Member of Parliament for Gaborone Bonnington North constituency from 2019–2024. Mokgethi is a member of the Botswana Democratic Party.

== Political career ==
Mokgethi was originally a member of the Botswana Congress Party, before she resigned to join the Botswana Democratic Party. Ahead of the 2019 general election, she was selected as the BDP's candidate for Gaborone Bonnington North. She easily defeated opposition leader Duma Boko on 23 October after she received 3,033 votes compared to Boko's 1,851 votes. She was sworn in as an MP on 5 November 2019.

On 6 November 2019, president Mokgweetsi Masisi appointed Mokgethi Minister of Nationality, Immigration and Gender Affairs. She was sworn in on the same day and succeeded Dorcas Makgato-Malesu.

== Personal life ==
Her daughter, Sarona Motlhagodi, known professionally as Sasa Klaas, died on 6 March 2021 in a helicopter crash.
