= Flava Dome =

- Genre: Music; Entertainment
- Presented by: Sadi Dikgaka; Loungo Andre Pitse (2013–2018)
- Country of origin: Botswana
- Original languages: English; Setswana

Original release
- Network: Botswana Television (BTV)

Flava Dome is a music and entertainment television programme broadcast on Botswana Television (BTV), the national broadcaster of Botswana. It is one of BTV's flagship local entertainment shows alongside Mokaragana and Pula Power, with the three programmes collectively identified as BTV's principal vehicles for promoting popular music to a nationwide audience.

== Format ==
Flava Dome airs in a Friday night primetime slot on BTV. The show features music videos, live performances by local and regional artists, and presenter-led entertainment segments. A resident DJ is part of the regular cast alongside the presenting duo.

== Presenters ==
The show's earlier presenting era featured hosts known by the names Mosa and Edgar. In 2013 they were succeeded by Loungo Andre Pitse, known professionally as KingBee, and Sadi Dikgaka (full name Boipelo Sadi Dikgaka), who co-hosted together for five years. The programme was produced during that period by Kefilwe Leero.

KingBee announced his departure from the show in January 2018, citing a desire for personal and professional growth beyond the programme. His final episode aired on 26 January 2018. Sadi Dikgaka continued as presenter following his exit.

== Significance ==
Flava Dome is regularly cited in Botswana media coverage as a primary platform through which local artists reach a national television audience. Several musicians have referenced appearances on the show as meaningful milestones, and the show has served as an early public profile builder for artists working across Botswana's music industry.

== See also ==
- Botswana Television
- Sadi Dikgaka
- Mokaragana
