= National Arts Council of Botswana =

Agency overview
- Formed: 17 September 2020
- Jurisdiction: Botswana
- Headquarters: Gaborone, Botswana
- Parent agency: Ministry of Youth, Gender, Sport and Culture
- Website: nacb.org.bw

The National Arts Council of Botswana (NACB) is a parastatal body established by the Parliament of Botswana under the National Arts Council Act, 2020 (Act 10 of 2020). It operates under the Ministry of Youth, Gender, Sport and Culture and is mandated to develop, promote, and protect the creative and cultural sector in Botswana through policy, legislation, industry facilitation, grants, and partnerships. The NACB is the primary government vehicle for the commercialization of the arts in Botswana.

== Establishment ==
The National Arts Council Act was passed by Parliament on 17 September 2020 and came into effect in November 2020. The legislation was the culmination of years of advocacy by Botswana's creative sector for an independent statutory body to coordinate and fund the arts industry. Among the advocates for the council's creation was rapper and activist Kast, who undertook a 1,000-kilometre walk as part of the campaign.

The NACB commenced operations in 2022. Its establishment office was set up with support from the French Embassy, which contributed more than P12 million toward the council's initial program and infrastructure.

== Mandate ==
The NACB is mandated to:

- Develop, support, and coordinate arts and cultural activities throughout Botswana
- Provide grants and financial support to practitioners in the creative and cultural sector
- Facilitate the commercialization and growth of the creative industry
- Promote and protect Botswana's creative and cultural industries locally, regionally, and internationally
- Develop policy and legislative frameworks for the arts sector

== Funding ==
Section 22 of the National Arts Council Act provided for government funding through appropriations made by the National Assembly, but initially limited this to a three-year period from the Act's commencement. As the NACB had not yet generated independent revenue by the time this period was set to lapse, the Minister of Youth, Gender, Sport and Culture, Tumiso Rakgare, introduced an urgent amendment bill in September 2024 to remove the three-year cap and ensure continued government support. Parliament approved the amendment. The minister noted that the NACB had received P70 million for COVID-19 artist relief, P39 million for content creation, and P14 million for cross-country recordings of artists during the pandemic era.

== International partnerships ==
In February 2024 the NACB signed a Memorandum of Understanding (MOU) with the National Arts Council of South Africa (NACSA) at the NAC head office in Newtown, Johannesburg. The agreement was signed by NACB Director of Creative and Cultural Sector Development Obenne Mbaakanyi and NACSA interim CEO Julie Diphofa. The MOU covers Cultural and Creative Exchange Programmes, Heritage Preservation, Arts Education Partnerships and Residencies, Institutional Exchanges, Internship and Training Programs, and Research and Development Projects.

== Criticism ==
By 2025, the NACB had drawn significant criticism from the creative sector. Artists and industry insiders described the institution as hampered by boardroom disputes, political interference, and allegations of maladministration. In Parliament, the Minister of Sport and Arts, Jacob Kelebeng, acknowledged that the absence of formal operating regulations had left the council functioning in a governance grey zone. Petitioning artists publicly called for the dissolution of the current board. Mmegi described the council as a "dysfunctional disillusionment", arguing that the institution had failed to live up to its founding promise of providing a bridge between artists and government.

== See also ==
- Ministry of Youth, Gender, Sport and Culture (Botswana)
- Music of Botswana
- Yarona FM Music Awards
