= Sky Girls BW =

SKY Girls BW
- Formation: February 2014
- Location: Gaborone, Botswana
- Fields: Youth empowerment, behavioural change communication, edutainment
- Parent organization: The Dialogue Group
- Affiliations: Bill & Melinda Gates Foundation
- Website: www.skygirlsbw.com

Sky Girls BW is a Botswana-based empowerment campaign targeting teenage girls, founded in February 2014. The campaign is run by The Dialogue Group and funded by the Bill & Melinda Gates Foundation. It operates through a behavioral change model that combines edutainment content, school outreach, social media, radio programming, and live events with the aim of building resilience and confidence among adolescent girls and reducing smoking uptake.

Following its establishment in Botswana, the programme has expanded to six other African countries, including Zambia, Nigeria, Kenya, Côte d'Ivoire, Ghana, and Senegal, which launched in 2025.

== Background ==
SKY Girls BW was established in February 2014 as a campaign to empower teenage girls in Botswana through edutainment, content that combines entertainment and education to promote positive decision-making. The program is managed by The Dialogue Group and has been funded since its inception by the Bill & Melinda Gates Foundation. Its approach centers on listening to its target audience and responding to the realities faced by adolescent girls, including peer pressure, issues of self-identity, and social confidence.

An independent evaluation conducted by the University of Botswana found that 95% of teenage girls in the programme's testing area were aware of SKY Girls, with 82% agreeing that the campaign had improved their lives in some way, and 85% reporting that it had helped them feel more confident about their decisions.

== Programming ==
=== MatswakaBae ===
In 2016, SKY Girls introduced a storytelling component to its campaign through a teen radio drama titled MatswakaBae, which airs on national radio station RB2. The drama, scripted by T.O.P Art in collaboration with the SKY Girls team and featuring voice artists selected through open auditions, incorporates poetry, musical performances, and narrative storylines centred on the lives of teenage girls in Gaborone.

Season 1 followed a character named Lerato Kgopolo, a 15-year-old girl navigating her transition from a village to a school in Gaborone and the social pressures that came with it. Season 2, which aired in April 2017, explored the theme of popularity and peer conformity. Season 3, which launched on 26 August 2017, addressed exam pressure, relationship dynamics, and the influence of transactional relationships among young people.

=== Sky Live ===
SKY Girls also produces a radio show titled Sky Live, broadcast on RB2.

=== Events and outreach ===
In 2014, SKY Girls BW hosted a fashion show at Limkokwing University of Creative Technology in Botswana, showcasing clothing by local designers. That same year, Botswana musician Zeus released the single Touch the Sky, accompanied by a music video produced in association with SKY Girls BW, with the track aimed at encouraging teenagers facing peer pressure.

In February 2025, to mark the programme's tenth anniversary, SKY Girls hosted a smoke-free festival that brought together over 2,000 teenage girls. Attendees were provided with free transportation from Railpark Mall to Ba Isago University, where the event took place. The programme included performances by artists Dato Seiko, Lioness Ratang, and South African DJ Zinhle, as well as interactive booths focused on refusal skills and personal pledges. The event was co-sponsored by Legends Barbershop, among others.

== Recognition ==
In September 2022, SKY Girls BW received the Highly Commended Paper award at the World Social Marketing Conference, held in the United Kingdom from 5 to 8 September 2022. The award recognizes outstanding work in social marketing, the use of marketing techniques to promote positive behavioral change. Director of The Dialogue Group, Tonderai Tsara, described the recognition as validation of the campaign's audience-led approach.
