= Charma Gal =

Motswana singer and songwriter

- Born: Magdeline Lesolobe; 18 December 1983 (age 42); Lerala, Botswana
- Genres: Mosakaso; Kwaito; Traditional
- Occupations: Singer; Songwriter
- Instrument: Vocals
- Years active: 2005–present
- Label: Charma Gal Productions

Magdeline Lesolobe (born 18 December 1983), known professionally as Charma Gal, is a Motswana singer and songwriter.

== Career ==
=== Culture Spears ===
She was a founding member of the cultural music group Culture Spears, established in 2005. The group became widely recognised in Botswana for its fusion of traditional music and dance.

=== Solo career ===
Following her departure from the group, she established her own label, Charma Gal Productions, and released multiple studio albums.

Her 2017 album Mmokolodi was released in April of that year.

In 2018, she was featured on Master KG's single Nsalele le ngwana. She has also collaborated with regional artists including Makhadzi and Jah Prayzah.

Her later releases include the album Likhona Likhona (2022), which includes collaborations with other southern African artists.

== Discography ==
=== Albums ===
- Mmokolodi (2017)
- Lekgamu La Bananyana (2018)
- Likhona Likhona (2022)

== See also ==
- Music of Botswana
