= Sojwe =

- Village
- Location in Botswana
- Coordinates: 23°26′19″S 25°45′44″E
- Country: Botswana
- District: Kweneng District

Population (2001)
  - Total: 2,056

Sojwe is a village in Kweneng District of Botswana. The population was 2,056 in 2001 census.
