= Botswana Music Union =

Botswana Music Awards (BOMU)
- Awarded for: Outstanding achievements in the music industry of Botswana
- Country: Botswana
- Presented by: Recording Industry of Botswana
- First award: 2011; 15 years ago

Television/radio coverage
- Network: Botswana television

The Botswana Music Awards Union (often simply the BOMU) are the Recording Industry of Botswana's music industry awards, established in 2011. The ceremony is held annually to celebrate the best or outstanding artists in Botswana. The nomination takes place and typically the winner announced according to jury's decision or according to the number of sent SMS since voting is done via mobile Sms.

The show has mostly been held at the Gaborone International Convention Centre (GICC) Gaborone, Botswana with the exception of six years, and broadcast live on national broadcaster, Botswana television. The ceremony features live performances as once-off collaborations by a selection of nominees.
BOMU is usually sponsored by the MYSC Botswana with the annual grant program to do the project.

== Bomu categories ==
=== Album genre categories ===
1. Best disco album
2. Best Mosakaso album
3. Best Polka/Folklore album
4. Best Rnb album
5. Best Afro pop album
6. Best Jazz album
7. Best traditional gospel album
8. Best contemporary gospel album
9. Best house music
10. Best traditional music album
11. Best Kwaito album

=== Non-genre categories ===
1. Honorary Legends award

a. Past
b. Present

1. President award
2. Best electronic media journalist
3. Best Print Media journalist
4. Most Dedicated artist

=== Other categories ===
1. Best Dvd
2. Best Music producer
3. Best Music video
4. Single track
5. Best collabo
