= Yarona FM =

Radio station based in Gaborone, Botswana

Yarona FM is an urban broadcaster targeting young adults. The radio station is a private commercial entity that has existed since 1999. It is regulated by BOCRA and attracts a unique weekly audience of 250,000.

== History ==
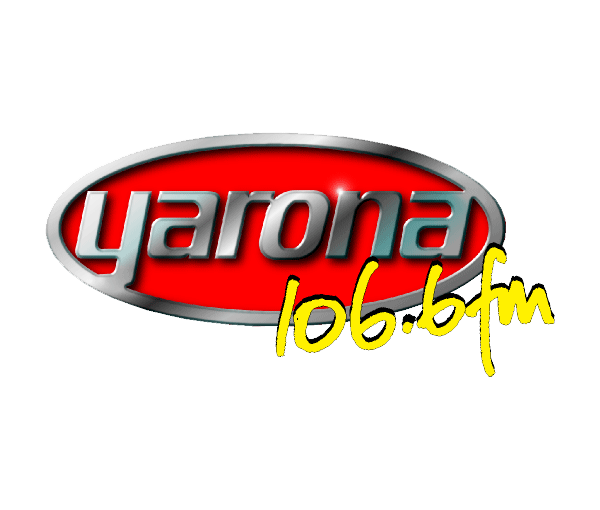
Yarona FM logo, August 1999 - March 2008

The radio station started its 24-hour broadcast on August 22, 1999, the first independent radio station in the country, and at first was primarily a local broadcaster within Gaborone (the capital city of Botswana) covering a radius of 50 km from its central transmitter. Until 2004 it was one of the only two licensed private radio stations in the country. In June 2007 the station was offered a national broadcast license by Botswana Communications Regulatory Authority and began a national rollout covering Botswana's major centres: Lobatse, Mahalapye, Serowe, Palapye, Selibe Phikwe, Francistown and Maun. For much of its history, its programming focus was on arts and culture, primarily consisting of programs devoted to RnB, Hip Hop, Motswako and Pop music.

The official Yaronafm logo since April 2008

== Brand ==
From its conception, Yarona FM has identified itself with the "freshest" and newest songs, targeted towards Botswana's urban youth audience. Its initial tag lines were "Re tswhere vibe": setswana for "we've got the vibe" and "blazing GC's most rocking tunes". When the station went national in 2008, the tag line changed to "Live the music". Yarona FM is a positive, upwardly mobile forward thinking brand that encapsulates the aspirations, style, language, lives and future of the Youth of Botswana.

== Current Presenters ==
Fox, MOG, DJ Sway, Melanie, Lerato Modiega, Luhle, Kat, Thabang Matlale, Katlego Rakola, Soso, Vincent Roman Matthys, DJ Kellz, Reitumetse, Kage, Mr Tee, VVA, Zoe Pilane

== Frequencies(From South to North) ==
Until April 2008, the radio station was broadcasting through the frequency 106.6 FM, which was part of its logo and brand until 7 more frequencies were added.

- Lobatse: 102.1 FM
- Gaborone: 106.6 FM
- Mahalapye: 99.9 FM
- Serowe: 102.9 FM
- Palapye: 105.1 FM
- Selibe Phikwe & Maun: 97.5 FM
- Francistown: 100.1 FM
- Sojwe: 100.8 FM
- Salajwe : 98.2 FM
- Takatokwane, Jwaneng & Senyamadi: 104.9 FM
- Malwelwe : 94.9 FM

== Past presenters ==
Japs, Luzboy, Stups dawg, Big Duke, Bonni Dintwa, Tumie Ramsden, DJ Izzy, Chawa Bale, Dollar Mac, King Bee, Tshepo Ntshole, Dig Nash, Otis Fraser, Kepi, O'neal, Junior Psy, Jazelle, Owen Rampha (Current Head of content), McD, Kedi Lezozo, Scar, Kingdom, Dum-luv, MduThaParty, and Big Fish are all popular names identified with the Yarona FM brand in the past. Some of these have now moved on to other local radio stations or to other ventures. Of late, and due to the high standards at Yarona FM, the station has become the number one breeding ground for talent amongst other broadcast entities in Botswana.

The youngest presenter in the history of the station are Kabelo "Japs" Tlhomelang (at age 15), airing in July 2000 with Kgosi "Dollar Mac" Kgosidintsi.

== Yarona FM schedule ==
=== Podcasting ===
Yarona FM content is also available via their YouTube channel, Spotify, TikTok and Facebook pages.

=== Schedule ===
The network's base schedule is noted here, and applies only to Yarona FM's outlets.

	Monday	Tuesday	Wednesday	Thursday	Friday	Saturday	Sunday
Time							
5am						The Take Off Hosted by: Mr T	
6am	The Big Breakfast Show Hosted by: Bad Boy Brando & Boineelo Hardy	The Big Breakfast Show Hosted by: Bad Boy Brando & Boineelo Hardy	The Big Breakfast Show Hosted by: Bad Boy Brando & Boineelo Hardy	The Big Breakfast Show Hosted by: Bad Boy Brando & Boineelo Hardy	The Big Breakfast Show Hosted by: Bad Boy Brando & Boineelo Hardy	The Take Off Hosted by: Mr T	Beats From Heaven Hosted by: Mr T
6am	The Big Breakfast Show Hosted by: Bad Boy Brando & Boineelo Hardy	The Big Breakfast Show Hosted by: Bad Boy Brando & Boineelo Hardy	The Big Breakfast Show Hosted by: Bad Boy Brando & Boineelo Hardy	The Big Breakfast Show Hosted by: Bad Boy Brando & Boineelo Hardy	The Big Breakfast Show Hosted by: Bad Boy Brando & Boineelo Hardy	The Take Off Hosted by: Mr T	Beats From Heaven Hosted by: Mr T
8am	The Big Breakfast Show Hosted by: Bad Boy Brando & Boineelo Hardy	The Big Breakfast Show Hosted by: Bad Boy Brando & Boineelo Hardy	The Big Breakfast Show Hosted by: Bad Boy Brando & Boineelo Hardy	The Big Breakfast Show Hosted by: Bad Boy Brando & Boineelo Hardy	The Big Breakfast Show Hosted by: Bad Boy Brando & Boineelo Hardy	The Take Off Hosted by: Mr T	Beats From Heaven Hosted by: Mr T
9am	The Big Breakfast Show Hosted by: Bad Boy Brando & Boineelo Hardy	The Big Breakfast Show Hosted by: Bad Boy Brando & Boineelo Hardy	The Big Breakfast Show Hosted by: Bad Boy Brando & Boineelo Hardy	The Big Breakfast Show Hosted by: Bad Boy Brando & Boineelo Hardy	The Big Breakfast Show Hosted by: Bad Boy Brando & Boineelo Hardy	House of ZU Hosted by: Zuziwe Mavuma	House of Zu Hosted by: Zuziwe Mavuma
11am	Power to the People Hosted by: Mdu Tha Party	Power to the People Hosted by: Mdu Tha Party	Power to the People Hosted by: Mdu Tha Party	Power to the People Hosted by: Mdu Tha Party	Power To the People Hosted by: Mdu Tha Party	Yarona FM Hot 40 Hosted by: Ninah Lr	House of Zu Hosted by: Zuziwe Mavuma
12noon	Power to the People Hosted by: Mdu Tha Party	Power to the People Hosted by: Mdu Tha Party	Power to the People Hosted by: Mdu Tha Party	Power to the People Hosted by: Mdu Tha Party	Power To the People Hosted by: Mdu Tha Party	Yarona FM Hot 40 Hosted by: Ninah Lr	House of Zu Hosted by: Zuziwe Mavuma
1pm	Power to the People Hosted by: Mdu Tha Party	Power to the People Hosted by: Mdu Tha Party	Power to the People Hosted by: Mdu Tha Party	Power to the People Hosted by: Mdu Tha Party	Power To the People Hosted by: Mdu Tha Party	Yarona FM Hot 40 Hosted by: Ninah Lr	Sugar Rush Hosted by: Ninah LR
2pm	Power to the People Hosted by: Mdu Tha Party	Power to the People Hosted by: Mdu Tha Party	Power to the People Hosted by: Mdu Tha Party	Power to the People Hosted by: Mdu Tha Party	Power To the People Hosted by: Mdu Tha Party		
	The Galaxy Sports Show Hosted by : Fox						
3pm	Shuddup and Drive Hosted by: Kedi & King Bee Loungo	Shuddup and Drive Hosted by: Kedi & King Bee Loungo	Shuddup and Drive Hosted by: Kedi & King Bee Loungo	Shuddup and Drive Hosted by: Kedi & King Bee Loungo	Shuddup and Drive Hosted by: Kedi & King Bee Loungo	Kaofela Hosted by: Mzitho	Kaofela Hosted by: Mzitho
4pm	Shuddup and Drive Hosted by: Kedi & King Bee Loungo	Shuddup and Drive Hosted by: Kedi & King Bee Loungo	Shuddup and Drive Hosted by: Kedi & King Bee Loungo	Shuddup and Drive Hosted by: Kedi & King Bee Loungo	Shuddup and Drive Hosted by: Kedi & King Bee Loungo	Kaofela Hosted by: Mzitho	Kaofela Hosted by: Mzitho
5pm	Shuddup and Drive Hosted by: Kedi & King Bee Loungo	Shuddup and Drive Hosted by: Kedi & King Bee Loungo	Shuddup and Drive Hosted by: Kedi & King Bee Loungo	Shuddup and Drive Hosted by: Kedi & King Bee Loungo	Shuddup and Drive Hosted by: Kedi & King Bee Loungo	Kaofela Hosted by: Mzitho	Kaofela Hosted by: Mzitho
6pm	Shuddup and Drive Hosted by: Kedi & King Bee Loungo	Shuddup and Drive Hosted by: Kedi & King Bee Loungo	Shuddup and Drive Hosted by: Kedi & King Bee Loungo	Shuddup and Drive Hosted by: Kedi & King Bee Loungo	The Log Drum Hosted by: Lala Slay	Kaofela Hosted by: Mzitho	
7pm	Good Vibes Only Hosted by: Thabo Mhapha	Good Vibes Only Hosted by: Thabo Mhapha	Good Vibes Only Hosted by: Thabo Mhapha	Good Vibes Only Hosted by: Thabo Mhapha	The Log Drum Hosted by: Lala Slay		The Soccer Show Hosted by: Fox
8pm	Good Vibes Only Hosted by: Thabo Mhapha	Good Vibes Only Hosted by: Thabo Mhapha	Good Vibes Only Hosted by: Thabo Mhapha	Good Vibes Only Hosted by: Thabo Mhapha	267 Hip Hop Hosted by: Dj Sway		The Soccer Show Hosted by: Fox
9pm	Good Vibes Only Hosted by: Thabo Mhapha	Good Vibes Only Hosted by: Thabo Mhapha	Good Vibes Only Hosted by: Thabo Mhapha	Good Vibes Only Hosted by: Thabo Mhapha	267 Hip Hop Hosted by: Dj Sway		The Soccer Show Hosted by: Fox
10pm					Yarona FM #YFest Hosted by: Dj Mix	Yarona FM #YFest Hosted by: DJ Mix	The Revolution Hosted by: Dj Kellz
11pm					Yarona FM #YFest Hosted by: Dj Mix	Yarona FM #YFest Hosted by: DJ Mix	The Revolution Hosted by: Dj Kellz
12am					Yarona FM #YFest Hosted by: Dj Mix	Yarona FM #YFest Hosted by: DJ Mix	The Revolution Hosted by: Dj Kellz
1am					Yarona FM #YFest Hosted by: Dj Mix	Yarona FM #YFest Hosted by: DJ Mix	The Revolution Hosted by: Dj Kellz
