= Vee Mampeezy =

Motswana singer and songwriter

- Born: Odirile Ishmael Sento; May 17, 1983 (age 43); Hukuntsi, Botswana
- Genres: House Kwasa; Kwaito; House; Afropop
- Occupations: Singer; songwriter; record label executive
- Instrument: Vocals
- Years active: 2001–present

Odirile Ishmael Sento (born 17 May 1983), known professionally as Vee Mampeezy, is a Motswana singer, songwriter, record label executive, and CEO of a fast food restaurant called Veetro's.

According to Music In Africa, he is credited with developing a style known as kwaito kwasa, combining elements of kwaito and kwasa kwasa.

== Early life ==
Sento was born in Hukuntsi, Botswana. He has cited regional artists as musical influences and began developing his music at a young age.

== Career ==
=== Early career ===
He released early projects in the 2000s and later established the Black Money Makers label.

=== Music and recognition ===
His music has been broadcast on platforms including MTV Base and Trace Africa, and he has performed internationally.

He has collaborated with regional artists such as Khuli Chana, Cassper Nyovest, and Jah Prayzah.

His single "I Do" received the Metro FM One Africa award in 2017, making him one of the first Motswana artists to receive the recognition.

== Discography ==
=== Albums ===
- Introloction (2001)
- Lamalanga (2003)
- Kasi Angels (2004)
- Ntja Mme (2005)
- Ditshipi Tsame (2006)
- Kasiology (2007)

=== Selected singles ===
- "Taku Taku"
- "Important"
- "I Do"
- "Dumalana"
- "Dololo"
- "No Suffer"
- "Your Time Is Coming"

== See also ==
- Music of Botswana
