= List of dams and reservoirs in Botswana =

The following is a partial list of dams and reservoirs in Botswana.

== List of dams (reservoirs) ==
Name of dam	Nearest city	District	Impounds	Year created	Capacity (megalitre)	Location	Notes
Bokaa Dam	Bokaa	Kgatleng District	Metsimotlhabe River	1990	18,500	24°27′08″S 25°59′52″E	
Dikgatlhong Dam	Robelela	Central District	Shashe River	2011	400,000	21°32′56″S 27°58′52″E	
Gaborone Dam	Gaborone	South-East District	Notwane River	1963	141,100	24°43′06″S 25°54′27″E	
Letsibogo Dam	Mmadinare	Central District	Motloutse River	2000	100,000	21°49′42″S 27°42′47″E	
Lotsane Dam	Maunatlala	Central District	Lotsane River	2012	40,000	22°35′31″S 27°36′52″E	
Mogobane Dam	Mogobane	South-East District	Mogobane River	1937		24°58′28″S 25°41′48″E	
Nnywane Dam	Lobatse	South-East District	Nnywane River	1970	2,300	25°06′53″S 25°40′57″E	
Ntimbale Dam	Tantebane	North-East District	Tati River	2004	26,000	20°52′05″S 27°28′09″E	
Shashe Dam	Shashe Mooke	North-East District	Shashe River	1970	85,000	21°20′44″S 27°24′36″E	
Thune Dam	Bobonong	Central District	Thune River	2012	90,000	22°16′16″S 28°48′02″E	

== See also ==
- List of rivers of Botswana
- Lakes of Botswana
- List of dams and reservoirs
