= Tati East =

Parliamentary constituency in the North-East District Botswana, 2004 onwards

- Single-member constituency for the National Assembly
- District: North-East
- Population: 38,485
- Major settlements: Tati Siding
- Area: 3,021 km^{2}

Current constituency
- Created: 2004
- Party: BCP
- Created from: North East; Francistown East
- MP: Tlhabologo Furniture
- Margin of victory: 418 (3.1 pp)

Tati East is a constituency in the North-East represented in the National Assembly of Botswana by Tlhabologo Furniture of the Botswana Congress Party since 2024.

== Constituency profile ==
The seat is predominantly rural and encompasses the following localities:

1. Tshesebe
2. Senyawe
3. Butale
4. Tsamaya
5. Siviya
6. Jackalas No. 2
7. Mabudzane
8. Mowana
9. Themashanga
10. Matsiloje
11. Matlopi
12. Matshelagabedi
13. Shashe Bridge
14. Ditladi
15. Patayamatebele
16. Tati Siding

== Members of Parliament ==
Key: BDP BCP

Election	Winner
2004 election	Guma Moyo
2009 election	Guma Moyo
2014 election	Guma Moyo
2019 election	Douglas Letsholathebe
2024 election	Tlhabologo Furniture

== Election results ==
=== 2024 election ===
General election 2024: Tati East
Party	Candidate	Votes	%	±%
BCP	Tlhabologo Furniture	4,490	33.47	N/A
BDP	Douglas Letsholathebe	4,072	30.35	−24.86
UDC	Thomas Mpenya	3,692	27.52	−11.17
Independent	Sean Sebele	1,161	8.65	N/A
Margin of victory		418	3.12	N/A
Total valid votes		13,415	99.17	−0.04
Rejected ballots		112	0.83	+0.04
Turnout		13,527	83.10	−0.45
Registered electors		16,278		
BCP gain from BDP		Swing	+29.17	

=== 2019 election ===
General election 2019: Tati East
Party	Candidate	Votes	%	±%
BDP	Douglas Letsholathebe	6,480	55.21	−5.24
UDC	Mathodi Modisapudi	3,955	33.69	−5.86
BPF	Tshwenyego Mbise	716	6.10	N/A
AP	Peter Ngoma	587	5.00	N/A
Margin of victory		2,525	21.51	−14.98
Total valid votes		11,738	99.21	+0.52
Rejected ballots		94	0.79	−0.52
Turnout		11,832	83.55	+0.53
Registered electors		14,161		
BDP hold		Swing	−0.31	

=== 2014 election ===
General election 2014: Tati East
Party	Candidate	Votes	%	±%
BDP	Guma Moyo	5,864	60.45	−9.18
BCP	Maria Kusasa	2,324	23.96	N/A
UDC	Peter Kuchwe	1,512	15.59	N/A
Margin of victory		3,540	36.49	−2.78
Total valid votes		9,700	98.69	+0.21
Rejected ballots		120	1.31	−0.21
Turnout		9,829	83.02	+7.73
Registered electors		11,840		
BDP hold		Swing	N/A	

=== 2009 election ===
General election 2009: Tati East
Party	Candidate	Votes	%	±%
BDP	Guma Moyo	5,396	69.63	+7.37
BPP	Maria Kusasa	2,353	30.37	−3.53
Margin of victory		1,043	39.27	+10.91
Total valid votes		7,749	98.48	+0.37
Rejected ballots		120	1.52	−0.37
Turnout		7,869	75.29	+0.98
Registered electors		10,452		
BDP hold		Swing	+5.45	

=== 2004 election ===
General election 2004: Tati East
Party	Candidate	Votes	%
BDP	Guma Moyo	3,644	62.26
BPP	Motlatsi Mbanga	1,984	33.90
BCP	Milidzani Letsholathebe	225	3.84
Margin of victory		1,660	28.36
Total valid votes		5,853	98.11
Rejected ballots		113	1.89
Turnout		5,966	74.31
Registered electors		8,029	
BDP win (new seat)			
