= Moralane =

- Water tank and pumping station
- Location within Botswana
- Coordinates: 22.074783°S 27.642843°E
- Country: Botswana
- District: Central District

Moralane is a key site on the North-South Carrier (NSC), in Botswana, the main pipeline delivering raw water from the northeast to the Mmamashia water treatment plant just north of Gaborone.

Phase 1 of the NSC opened in 2000, delivering water from the Letsibogo Dam on the Motloutse River. A reinforced concrete break pressure tank (BPT1) and a pumping station (PS2.1) were installed at Moralane in this phase. The break pressure tank has the capacity of 4,500 cubic metres (160,000 cu ft) and the pumping station has the capacity of 1.51 cubic metres (53 cu ft) per second.

Phase 2 of the NSC is due to start delivering water from the Dikgatlhong Dam on the Shashe River in 2014. The new pipeline from the Dikgatlhong Dam runs parallel to the existing pipeline along the section from the Letsibogo Dam to Moralane, causing concerns that blasting for the new pipeline may cause problems with the existing pipeline. The pumping equipment at Moralane will be upgraded by introduction of a variable speed drive. Initially, the water from both dams will be delivered through the same pipeline from Moralane south to Palapye.

An extension of the NSC is being considered to carry the Zambezi's water from Pandamatenga via Francistown to BPT1 at Moralane. A pre-feasibility study was delivered to the Department of Water Affairs in April 2010. This expansion would deliver another 100,000,000 cubic metres (3.5×10^{9} cu ft) of water annually through the Moralane plant.
