= Patayamatebele =

- Village
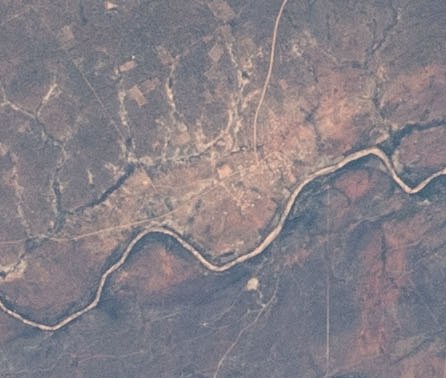

- Location within Botswana
- Coordinates: 21.481874°S 27.776901°E
- Country: Botswana
- District: North East District
- Ward: Ditladi ward
- Time zone: UTC+2 (Central Africa Time)
  - Summer (DST): UTC+2 (not observed)

Patayamatebele is a village in the North East District of Botswana near to the Dikgatlhong Dam.

== Location ==
Patayamatebele is a small village of about 500 people, 81 kilometres (50 mi) southeast of Francistown. The people belong to various groups such as the Bangwato, Basarwa, Bakhurutshe, Bakalaka and Babirwa. Patayamatebele lies between the Shashe and Tati rivers. The village was officially gazetted in 2007. It can be reached by road from Tonota via Ditladi. It has been proposed that Patayamatebele, and the villages of Shashe Bridge and Ditladi, which today are in the Tati West constituency, should be transferred to the Tati East constituency. The reason for transferring Patayamatebele is its proximity to Matopi. The village is serviced by Tonota Agricultural District.

== Economy ==
The main economic activities in Patayamatebele are farming and gathering wild berries. The cattle in the area were destroyed due to foot-and-mouth disease in the 2002/2003 period. In September 2012, Peter Siele, the Minister of Local Government, said Patayamatebele and nearby Matopi would be recommended for the Remote Area Service Allowance due to their distance from banks and shops and lack of public transport. Roads to the village are in poor condition. The village has a primary school. Medical services are provided by a mobile clinic. The village does not have telephone service.

Before construction of the Dikgatlhong Dam began, in 2008 the government arranged for counselling services on AIDS to residents of the Mmadinare, Robelela, Matopi, Matsiloje, Chokwe and Patayamatebele villages. Preparations were made for additional demands for health and policing services.
