= Morwa, Botswana =

Morwa
- Location in Botswana
- Coordinates: 24°26′13″S 26°4′22″E
- Country: Botswana
- District: Kgatleng District

Population (2001)
  - Total: 2,696

Morwa is a village in Kgatleng District of Botswana. It is located around 15 km south-west of Mochudi, and the population was 2,696 in 2001 census.

== Location ==
Morwa is a village in Botswana which lies 30 km north of the capital Gaborone. The village is linked to the capital by a dual carriageway and connected to the national electricity grid. A seasonal Metsimotlhabe River runs south of the village. This river flows into Bokaa Dam which supplies both Bokaa, Morwa and Gaborone. Before this development people drank from the boreholes and before then from the river and wells.

== History ==
The current village kgosi/chief is Mr Eric Masisi Ntshole who succeeded his father Mr Mogotsi Ntshole. Mr Mogotsi Ntshole took over from his father Mr Ramogotsi Ntshole. The population of Morwa consist mainly of Bakgatla tribe and is divided into wards namely; Mokone, Matetswane, Manakedi etc.

== Developments ==
Major roads in the village are bituminised/tarred and has four schools, namely Ramogotsi Primary School, Our Lady of Carmel School, BORWA Junior Secondary School and a private college. The village enjoys lit streets especially along the main roads.

== Recreation ==
Morwa boasts of three football teams which are Morwa Dynamos, Morwa Rising Stars and Lelotong Young Stars. During Christmas and other special occasions the audience is usually entertained by traditional choirs and poets. The village has one community hall which is used for different activities both official and private.
