= Matopi =

- Village
- Location within Botswana
- Coordinates: 21.484071°S 27.937797°E
- Country: Botswana
- District: North East District
- Ward: Ditladi ward
- Time zone: UTC+2 (Central Africa Time)
  - Summer (DST): UTC+2 (not observed)

Matopi is a village in the North East District of Botswana near to the Dikgatlhong Dam.

== Location ==
The village is serviced by Tonota Agricultural District.

== Economy ==
Towards the end of 2002 there was an outbreak of Foot and Mouth Disease in the Matopi and Tseteng areas, apparently due to infected cattle straying from Zimbabwe, leading to the killing of 4000 cattle. The government compensated farmers in cash and with animals and introduced a relief program. The village has a health post. It does not have telephone service.

Before construction of the Dikgatlhong Dam began, in 2008 the government arranged for counselling services on AIDS to residents of the Mmadinare, Robelela, Matopi, Matsiloje, Chokwe and Patayamatebele villages. Preparations were made for additional demands for health and policing services.
