= Mmamashia =

- Water treatment plant and reservoir
- Location within Botswana
- Coordinates: 24.520937°S 25.986698°E
- Country: Botswana
- District: Gaborone

Mmamashia is a location in Botswana about 15 kilometres (9.3 mi) north of the capital city of Gaborone that is the site of the Mmamashia water treatment plant and master balancing reservoir.

== Waterworks ==
The reservoir and plant are operated and maintained by the Water Utilities Corporation. The original source of supply was the Bokaa Dam, directly to the north. Implementation of the North-South Carrier water project in 2000 brought raw water to the plant from the Letsibogo Dam on the Motloutse River, much further north. After treatment the water is distributed to consumers in the Gaborone area.

The reservoir is built of reinforced concrete, and has a capacity of 78,000 cubic metres (2,800,000 cu ft). The reservoir is closed to minimize loss through evaporation. As of 2003 the plant had capacity of 92,000 cubic metres (3,200,000 cu ft) per day. That year there was a shortage of water from the Letsibogo Dam, planned to be the primary supply. Instead, the plant was using water from the Gaborone Dam and water imported from South Africa.

Phase 2 of the North-South Carrier Water Project brings additional water from the Dikgatlhong Dam. The additional water is expected to come available in 2014. The Mmamashia plant will be upgraded with an additional capacity of 45 Ml/d pre-treatment, due to eutrophication at Bokaa, and 45 Ml/day secondary treatment.

== Social impact ==
Thirteen families were forced to move for construction of the Mmamashia regulating pond, receiving compensation. Construction of a road from Mmamashia to Malolwane in the Kgatleng District was scheduled to start in June 2008, passing between the Matebeleng and Oodi villages. The government was compensating farmers who lost land. In May 2012 six families of squatters at Mmamashia with 37 children were evicted and their homes demolished by the Kgatleng Landboard. The residents said they had been allocated some of the land by Kgosi Molefi and the rest by Kgosi Linchwe, and had occupied and farmed it for seventy years.
