= Tshokwe =

- Village
- Location within Botswana
- Coordinates: 21.7441°S 28.1167°E
- Country: Botswana
- District: Central District
- Time zone: UTC+2 (Central Africa Time)
  - Summer (DST): UTC+2 (not observed)

Tshokwe (or Chokwe) is a village in Central District of Botswana. The village is located south-east of Francistown, near the border with Zimbabwe, and it has a primary school. The population was 897 according to the 2001 census.

Tshokwe is 20 kilometres (12 mi) north of the village of Tobane, to which it is connected by a footpath. The village is extremely poor, and was afflicted by an outbreak of foot-and-mouth disease, which caused the cattle to be destroyed. Although the government has provided power lines and water pipes for connection to homesteads, most of the people cannot afford the connections. The government has been attempting to assist through affirmative action, where residents of remote communities are given preference in government hiring programs.

The village is southeast of the Dikgatlhong Dam, which was constructed between 2008. Before work started on the dam, the government arranged for counselling services on AIDS both to construction workers and to residents of Chokwe as well as of the Mmadinare, Robelela, Matopi, Matsiloje and Patayamatebele villages. Preparations were made for additional demands for health and policing services.
