= Matsiloje =

- Village
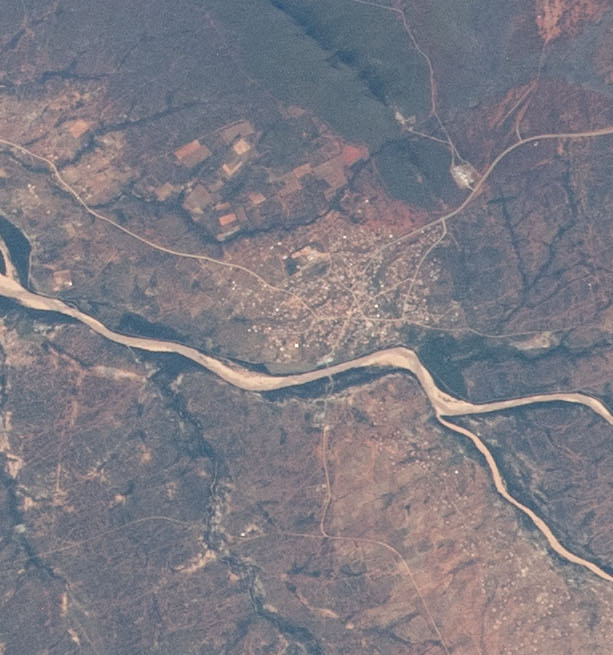

- Location within Botswana
- Coordinates: 21.30185°S 27.883723°E
- Country: Botswana
- District: North East District

Government
  - Kgosi: Eric Moipolai
- Time zone: UTC+2 (Central Africa Time)
  - Summer (DST): UTC+2 (not observed)

Matsiloje is a village in the North East District of Botswana on the west bank of the Ramokgwebana River, which forms the border with Zimbabwe.

A tarmac road connects the village to Francistown, to the east. The village has a junior secondary school. The village lies beside the Matsiloje hills, which are quarried for limestone used in manufacturing cement and soapstone products. The exploratory Muphanephane gold mine is in the Matsiloje area.

In 2002 there was an outbreak of foot-and-mouth disease in the Matsiloje and Matshelagabedi areas, with another outbreak in the Matopi and Tseteng areas towards the end of the year. 12,000 cattle were killed in Matsiloje/Matshelagabedi and 4000 cattle in Matopi/Tseteng. The government compensated farmers with cash and animals, and instituted a relief work program. The village is affected by illegal immigrants from Zimbabwe, and resulting crime.

Before construction of the Dikgatlhong Dam began to the south of Matsiloje in 2008, the government arranged for counselling services on AIDS to residents of Matsiloje as well as of the Mmadinare, Robelela, Matopi, Chokwe and Patayamatebele villages. Preparations were made for additional demands for health and policing services.
