= Ramokgwebana River =

Location
- Country: Botswana, Zimbabwe

Physical characteristics
- Source
  - coordinates: 21.563556°S 28.012206°E
- Mouth
  - location: Shashe River

Location of the mouth of the Ramokgwebana River on the Shashe River

The Ramokgwebana River (or Ramoqueban) is a river that defines part of the boundary between Botswana and Zimbabwe before entering the Shashe River from the left.

== History ==
The Tati District, a grant made to Captain Levert by the Matabele rulers, was the site of the first area of gold exploration in what is now Botswana. Very roughly corresponding to the North-East District of Botswana, it was bounded by the Ramoqueban to the east and the Shashi to the west. The Tati River, flowing between these two, enters the Shashe River about 6 kilometres (4 miles) above the point where the Ramoqueban enters the Shashe.

There is a border crossing between the village of Matsiloje in Botswana and the post of Warmley in Zimbabwe. In the 2000s, security was increased at the crossing due to the growing number of illegal immigrants entering Botswana from Zimbabwe, with a resultant increase in crime. Further north there is another crossing between Plumtree in Zimbabwe and Ramokgwebana in Botswana. During a period of low rainfall in 2010, the river largely dried up. There was tension between the people of the two towns who were competing for water from pools dug into the riverbed.

== Sources ==
- North East District Council (2003). "NORTH EAST DISTRICT DEVELOPMENT PLAN 6: 2003 – 2009". Archived from the original on 2011-12-09.
- Phiri, Marko (2010). "Zimbabwe- Neighbors Becoming Less Neighborly As Dwindling Rain Shrinks Border River". One Water. Knight Center for International Media. Archived from the original on 2012-08-08.
- White, John (2004-03-04). Scientific Travellers, 1789-1874. Taylor & Francis. ISBN 9780415289313.
