= Lotsane Dam =

- Location within Botswana
- Country: Botswana
- Location: North-East District
- Coordinates: 22.591976°S 27.61443°E
- Purpose: Urban water supply, Horticultural irrigation
- Opening date: 2012

Dam and spillways
- Height: 30 metres (98 ft)
- Length: 1.5 kilometres (0.93 mi)
- Spillway type: ogee

Reservoir
- Total capacity: 40,000,000 cubic metres (1.4×10^{9} cu ft)

The Lotsane Dam is a dam on the Lotsane River in Botswana completed in 2012. Its purpose is to provide drinking water to local villagers and to support a horticultural project.

== Description ==
The purpose of the dam is to provide a reliable source of drinking water to 22 villages in the Tswapong area, and to provide irrigation water for a 250 hectares (620 acres) horticulture operation near Maunatlala.

The dam is an earth fill embankment 30 metres (98 ft) high and 1.5 kilometres (0.93 mi) long, with an ungated 180 metres (590 ft) long ogee crest spillway. The reservoir has 40,000,000 cubic metres (1.4×10^{9} cu ft) active storage capacity. The dam was built by Sinohydro Corporation at a cost of about US$100.7 million. 835 Botswana citizens and 138 Chinese were employed in construction. The pipeline network to deliver the water will be 174 kilometres (108 mi) long when completed.

== Construction ==
The engineering service contract for design review, procurement and consultancy during construction of the dam was given to SMEC Holdings of Australia. The contract was awarded to Sinohydro of China in January 2009, with completion planned for October 2011. In May 2010 the Minister of Minerals, Energy and Water Resources warned that the water pipes from the Lotsane Dam to the villages would cut across some ploughing fields belonging to Maunatlala and Mokokwane residents, but said that the villagers would be compensated. In August 2011 the deadline for completion was extended to December 2011. As of February 2012 the dam was complete and starting to hold water, but did not yet have enough to start supplying the villages since there had not yet been any heavy rainfall in the catchment area.
