= Boldwin Balz Ramokate =

Boldwin Bals Ramokate
- Born: Tebogo Boldwin Ramokate c. 1991; Makaleng, North-East District, Botswana
- Occupations: Stand-up comedian, master of ceremonies (MC), actor, voice-over artist, event director, scriptwriter
- Known for: Stand-up comedy, co-founding the Gaborone Comedy Club, international performances

Boldwin Bals Ramokate (born c. 1991), known professionally as Boldwin Bals, is a Motswana stand-up comedian, master of ceremonies (MC), actor, voice-over artist, and event director. He is associated with Botswana's stand-up comedy scene and is a co-founder of the Gaborone Comedy Club. He has performed on local platforms and internationally, including headlining the Eswatini International Comedy Festival (ECOFEST) in 2025.

== Early life ==
Ramokate was born in Makaleng in Botswana's North-East District and grew up in Tholo Ward. He began performing comedy in 2016 after taking part in an open-mic event.

== Career ==
Ramokate made his debut performance in August 2016. He later expanded into hosting as a master of ceremonies. He has worked in various roles within the entertainment industry, including as an event organiser, voice-over artist, actor and scriptwriter.

He is a co-founder of the Gaborone Comedy Club, where he has participated in organising and performing in comedy events in Gaborone.

His performances have included appearances at comedy events such as:

- GIMC Comedy (2022)
- Too Young To Be This Old (2025), where he served as co-master of ceremonies and performer

In 2025, he headlined the Eswatini International Comedy Festival (ECOFEST), representing Botswana.

== Selected performances ==
- GIMC Comedy (2022)
- Too Young To Be This Old (2025)
- Eswatini International Comedy Festival (ECOFEST) (2025)
- Performances with Gaborone Comedy Club

== See also ==
- Gaborone comedy club
