= Tuli Block =

Geographic region in eastern Botswana

Location of the Tuli Block

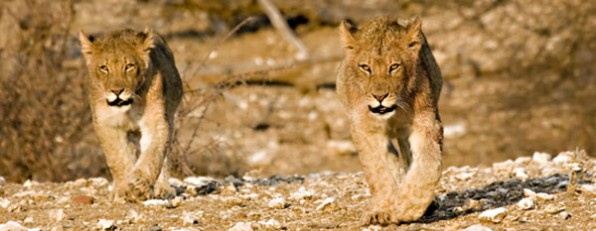
Lions at Tuli Block Botswana

The Tuli Block is a narrow fringe of land at Botswana's eastern border wedged between Zimbabwe in the north and east and South Africa in the south. It consists mainly of privately owned game farms offering safari tourism. The eastern section up to and including Redshield has been declared a game reserve, known as the Northern Tuli Game Reserve.

Tuli is renowned for its geographical features — Solomon's Wall by the Motloutse River at the southwestern corner of the Tuli Block, as well as for its location near the Tswapong and Lepokole Hills where the ancestors of the San people left traces of their rock paintings. The Tuli is readily accessible by road from South Africa and all the major cities in Botswana.

== Geography ==
The Tuli reaches from the southeast corner of Botswana, where the Shashe and the Limpopo Rivers meet, down to the Notwane River north of Olifants Drift in the South West. The entire conservancy area, including the adjacent safari area bordering the Tuli Circle, comprises about 800,000 hectares. The Tuli Block is quite different from anywhere else in Botswana. It is referred to as the Hardveld because of the rocky outcrops and the abundance of stones and pebbles of all shapes and sizes. The red sand of the Tuli area is an unforgettable trait, as well as the massive trees that occur along the banks of the Limpopo.

== History ==
Britain declared a protectorate over Bechuanaland in 1885. A decade later Chief Khama III ceded the area to the British South Africa Company. The object was to make the thin strip of rocky terrain a buffer against incursions by the South African Boer farmers. It was also on the direct route to Rhodesia where Cecil Rhodes intended to build his railway from the Cape to Cairo.

Rhodes soon discovered that the terrain across several rivers, gorges and rocky outcrops was totally unsuitable for building a railway so he shifted the line to today's route, which runs almost parallel but across the flat plains further to the west. The BSAC built Fort Tuli to protect its land and cattle, but otherwise found little economic use for the Tuli block. Hopes of finding gold in the area were quickly dashed. So a decade later the company sold off its land to private commercial farmers. They too soon found that the rugged, rocky terrain, with its rivers prone to flash floods, was unsuitable for anything but sparse livestock farming.

After the World War the farmers realised that more money could be made from the growing tourism market than direct farming. The Tuli block is an area of outstanding natural beauty with majestic rocks, strange vegetation, abundant wildlife, a profusion of birds and a rich archaeological heritage. This led the landowners to convert almost the whole strip into private game farms and reserves where tourists could be given exclusive holidays. Today the general public can only really access the Tuli block through the safari companies and these established farms and reserves. Otherwise private visitors are restricted to the main road running the length of the block.

The North East Tuli Game Reserve, on the confluence of the Limpopo and the Shashe rivers, is the collective name for several privately owned game reserves including the Mashatu and Tuli Game Reserves, covering all the land north of the Motloutse River. The whole area consisting of game reserves, hunting and conservation concessions covers up to 300,000 ha and is the largest privately owned game conservation area in Southern Africa. Mashatu Game Lodge has the largest elephant population on private land.

=== Boer War ===
Palapye had received news on October 16, 1899 that the Waterberg commando, under Assistant Commandant-General Frederick A. Grobler, was assembling on the eastern side of the Limpopo at Seleka's (opposite Ngwapa), near the drift later marked on South African maps as Groblersbrug. The next day Khama ordered out the Maolola (or Mafhiri) regiment, under his brother Kebailele, to guard the Mahalapye railway bridge.

On the 20th and 21st came more definite intelligence that Grobler's force intended to attack Palapye by way of redoubts at Ngwapa hill, Sefhare hill, and Ratholo at the foot of the Tswapong hills. Khama immediately sent a regiment of 400 men to fortify Ngwapa, the key natural fortress of the area. Thirty-six hours later, 100 Rhodesian white militia with a 7-pounder gun arrived at Palapye Road station. 80 of them repaired to Palapye town, where the substantial church building was converted into a fortress inside a double-ring of stone walls, stocked with a month's provisions for the white population.

On October 22, Khama received an ultimatum from Frederick Grobler, couched in respectful terms, informing him of the South African Republic's intention to invade. Grobler warned Khama to remain neutral. Khama replied the next day: 'If you enter with armed men into my country, and among my cattle-posts, I shall fight you.' He added that white people were under his protection, not vice versa.

Grobler made no immediate advance. He fretted over the failure of the northward thrust of the Marico and Rustenburg forces up the railway towards Mahalapye. Characteristically impatient, he withdrew with 400 men in a feint to the south and re-appeared in the north at Rhodes' Drift, near Tuli, to reinforce the Soutpansberg commando of Commandant van Rensburg - against the British Rhodesian forces of Colonel Plumer. Grobler's request to invade Rhodesia with van Rensburg was turned down by Pretoria. So, on or about November 5, Grobler came once again to camp at Seleka's village, with reinforcements from the Soutpansberg commando. There were now reportedly at Seleka's 637 Boers with 97 waggons and 4 field-pieces, together with about 750 armed African auxiliaries. Khama dispatched another regiment of 370 men to Ngwapa hill, a natural fortress that stood high above the valley - making a total of 700 defenders there.

On Tuesday, November 7, 1899, the combined Transvaal forces crossed the Limpopo and fired four shells at Ngwapa. They then doubled back across the river and began to build an earth-walled fort. There were no casualties on either side in the skirmish. Satisfied with this display of force, the concentration of Boer forces at Seleka's then dispersed north and south along the Bechuanaland front.

The Soutpansberg commando, with Waterberg assistance, made attacks across the Limpopo on Plumer's forces at Rhodes Drift on November 16–18. But Grobler and van Rensburg had dissipated and lost the military initiative.

== Flora and fauna ==
Much of the area is unfenced allowing the animals to roam freely between the Motloutse and Limpopo rivers. The vegetation is spectacular, the scenery diverse. Gigantic nyala trees and the yellow barked fever trees grow along the riverbanks. Gaunt sesame trees take root in rocky outcrops. Characteristic baobab trees are ubiquitous amongst the rock koppies. Animals flourish in the wild terrain.

Wildebeest, kudu, eland, impala and waterbuck migrate through the area. Lions (some of them black maned), leopard and cheetah follow the game and mingle with the large herds of elephants. Nile crocodiles abound in large pools in the Limpopo River, with the occasional hippopotamus. Bird life proliferates in the diverse environment. Tuli is one of the best places in southern Africa for ornithologists. Over 350 species of birds have been identified in the area, including rock thrushes, boulder chats, shrikes and cormorants. Different kinds of kingfishers dart into the streams and rivers, while waders stand in the shallows. The rare Pel's fishing owl frequents banks above large pools in rivers, best seen at night.

In other parts of Botswana night drives are not permitted, but here, on private land, game drives are arranged where visitors can see the elusive nocturnal creatures that are seldom seen by day, such as the leopard, caracal, aardwolf and aardvark. By day, experienced trackers and spotters take visitors into the bush by four-wheel-drive or on foot, while mountain biking over organised tracks has become increasingly popular.

== Attractions ==
=== Solomon's Wall ===
Solomon's Wall is basalt cliffs, 30 metres high, once formed a natural dam across the Motloutse river. A huge lake filled up behind it, with a waterfall spilling over the dyke during the rains, leaving rich mineral deposits of quartz, agate and other semi-precious stones. It was in the sands higher up the Motloutse river that the first alluvial diamonds were found in Botswana, giving a hint of the wealth that was to come.

At Molalatu, just north of the Tuli block, the descendants of the original inhabitants are still living. The villagers belonging to the Zionist Christian Church community have devised an ingenious method of protecting their livestock against the wildlife in the area. They breed 'goat dogs'. When the puppies are small they foster them out to lactating goats that treat them as their own young. The puppies grow up thinking of themselves as goats while preserving all their canine instincts. As they get older they accompany the goat herds into the bush and instinctively guard them against predators. Though no match for larger wild animals, their reactions create an element of surprise and often scare off potential attackers. The villagers consider them an effective deterrent, and they charge visitors a small fee to see these 'goat dogs'.

=== Tswapong and Lepokole Hills ===
The Tuli area is also famous for the Tswapong and Lepokole hills located about 140 km southwest. Tswapong is located to the east of Palapye. Over the ages, deep gorges have been carved into the ancient granite rocks by the seasonal rivers and springs. The waterfalls, rock pools and surrounding vegetation is unique in Botswana.

A jumble of hematite and granite blocks and kopjes forms the Lepokole Hills, a western prolongation of the Matobo Hills in Zimbabwe. They are located 15 km north of Bobonong. The last of the San in eastern Botswana lived in these hills and left more of their rock paintings in the caves and rocks. Stone Age tools and ancient pottery scattered around the hills are evidence of even earlier occupation.
