= Batalaunda =

Batalaote are an ethnic group found in Botswana and south-western parts of Zimbabwe, commonly mistaken to be part of a larger group called Bakalanga-Banyai. They speak dialects such as:

- Badhalaunda/batalaote (they lived in Madzilogwe, Mazhoubgwe, up to Zhozhobgwe.)
- BaNambya can be found in Hwange up to Gweta.
- BaLilima (BaWombe; Bayela. Are in the central district with Baperi)
- Baperi (live together with BaLilima as mentioned above)

Dhalaunda was the leader of one of these "Kalanga" sub-tribes and the clan was named after him, originally Badhalaunda, but then Bangwato changed it to Batalaote, as they changed Bakalanga to Bakalaka, maybe because of difficulty pronouncing the Kalanga words. They are found in the central district of Botswana and south-western parts of Zimbabwe. Over the years the Talaunda language was levelled to other Ikalanga dialects, just as the north-eastern Tjikalanga dialect is shifting to Tjililma. Some of them live in Serowe; former President of Botswana, Festus Mogae, is a member. These have completely lost their Ikalanga identity, and now just identify themselves as Talaote or Ngwato, with little knowledge of what Talaote really means.

They are thought to have been a part of the Rozvi/Lozi People upon a time beofore they fled zimbabwe due to supposed civil strife and their totem is a heart/pelo/moyo and they do not pierce their ears. . They are the Kalanga who settled in south Zimbabwe and Botswana. The Batalaunda people revere the heart of animals as their totem.
