= Obed Mokhuhlani =

Motswana artist

Obed Robert Mokhuhlani
- Born: 1980 (age 45–46); Sechele Village, Botswana
- Education: Molepolole College of Education (Diploma in Secondary Education, Fine Art); Vaal University of Technology (Diploma in Fine Art; BTech Fine Art, Printmaking)
- Known for: Visual art, printmaking, ceramics, curation
- Movement: Contemporary African art
- Awards: Thapong Artist of the Year (2014, 2017)

Obed Robert Mokhuhlani (born 1980) is a Motswana multidisciplinary visual artist, printmaker, ceramicist, art educator, and curator from Botswana. He is known for his printmaking and ceramic practices. Mokhuhlani works as an arts educator in Kanye, Botswana, and is involved in curatorial work in regional projects such as the Francistown Arts Meeting.

== Early life and education ==
Mokhuhlani was born in Sechele Village, Botswana, in 1980. He completed a Diploma in Secondary Education (majoring in Fine Art) at Molepolole College of Education in 2004. He later studied at the Vaal University of Technology (VUT) in the Vaal Triangle in South Africa, where he obtained a Diploma in Fine Art (Ceramics & Printmaking) and a BTech in Fine Art (Printmaking) with distinction (2017). He has also attended international residencies and workshops, including the Tulipamwe International Artist Workshop in Windhoek, Namibia.

== Career ==
Mokhuhlani's practice spans printmaking, ceramics, and mixed media; he has exhibited in Botswana and internationally. He has combined studio practice with art education and curatorial work, working as an art teacher in Kanye and founding Empire Arts Consultancy to support arts programming and professional development.

=== Curatorial activity ===
Mokhuhlani's curatorial activities began around 2016 when he organized an art educators’ exhibition at the Thapong Visual Art Centre in collaboration with Vaal University of Technology and the Botswana Consulate in South Africa. Since 2019 he has been contracted as resident curator for the Francistown Arts Meeting (FAM) annual visual arts exhibition. He also participated in the 2019 Curatorial Intensive program organized by Independent Curators International (ICI) in Cape Town.

== Selected exhibitions & projects ==
- Selected participant, 30th Barclays L'Atelier exhibition at the Absa Gallery, Johannesburg (2015).
- Participant, Tulipamwe International Artist Workshop, Windhoek (2018).
- Resident curator, Francistown Arts Meeting (FAM), Francistown, Botswana.
- Various group exhibitions in Botswana, South Africa, the United States(San Diego, New Mexico), Zambia and Namibia.

== Awards and recognition ==
- Thapong Artist of the Year Award (TAYA) in 2014 .
- Thapong Artist of the Year Award (TAYA) 2017

== Teaching and advocacy ==
As an art educator, Mokhuhlani has lectured and led workshops focusing on art pedagogy and professional development for artists and educators. He is also the founding chairperson of the Visual Art Forum for Educators in Southern Africa (VAFESA), an initiative to coordinate and support art teachers in the region.

== Reception and impact ==
Writers and cultural commentators have highlighted Mokhuhlani's dual role as practitioner and educator and his efforts to professionalize art practice in Botswana. He has been quoted advocating for treating art as a professional enterprise rather than a hobby.
