= Kgari =

Kgari may refer to:

- K'gari, formerly known as Fraser Island, an island off the coast of Queensland, Australia
- Kgari, a village in the African country Botswana
- Bakwana Kgosidintsi Kgari, politician from Botswana
