= Kgari, Botswana =

Kgari
- Village
- Location within Botswana
- Coordinates: 20.58329°S 27.60322°E

Population (2011)
  - Total: 534
- Time zone: UTC+2 (Central Africa Time)
  - Summer (DST): UTC+2 (not observed)
- Climate: BSh

Kgari is a village in the North-East District of Botswana. In 2001, the population was 581. In 2011, the population was 534.

The nearest populated places are Gambule, Pole, Ramokgwebana, and Hamangan, and the climate in the area is hot semi-arid (steppe) climate, according to the Köppen climate classification.
