= Goo Moremi Gorge =

Heritage site in Botswana

Goo Moremi Gorge is situated in Eastern Botswana, about 67 km east of Palapye town, in a small village of Goo Moremi. The gorge is a protected heritage site in the midst of Tswapong Hills. The gorge features permanent springs that form a beautiful waterfall surrounded by hills and cliffs.This natural site has unique vegetation with a range of wildlife like kudu, gemsbok, bush buck and different bird species. Equally beautiful is the Goo Moremi Lodge that provide modern accommodation to tourists vising the Goo Moremi Gorge. The Lodge provides five star chalets, campsite and tents.

== Activities ==
- Guided nature walks
- Bird viewing
- Gorge Hiking
- Waterfall viewing
