= Mmakgodumo Dam =

Dam in Kanye, Botswana

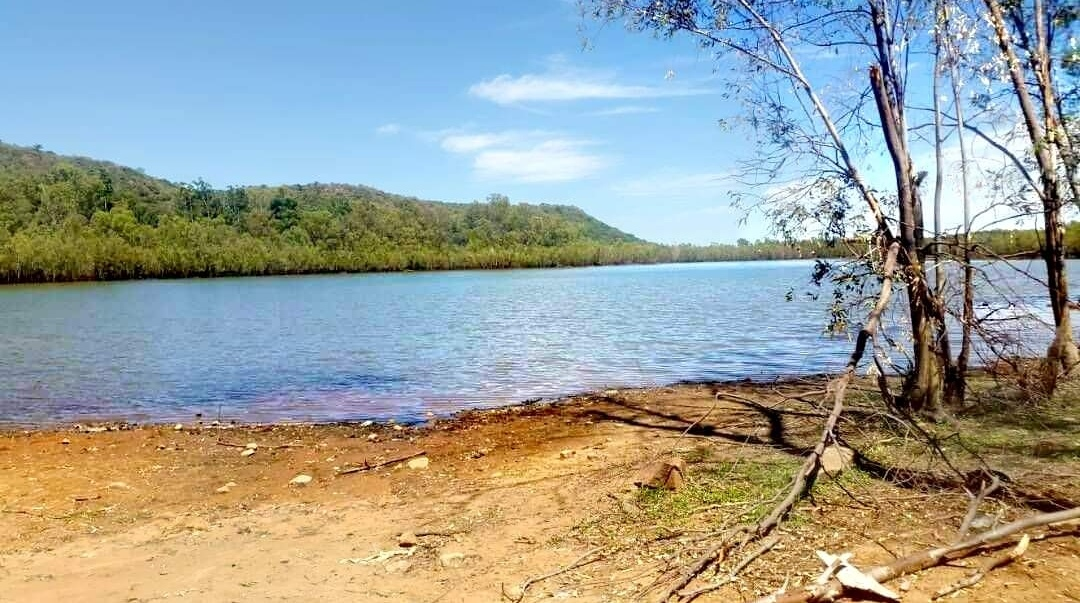
- Mmakgodumo Dam in Kanye
- Interactive map of Mmakgodumo Dam
- Location: Kanye, Southern District, Botswana
- Coordinates: 24.9501°S 25.3399°E
- Purpose: Irrigation, water supply, tourism, conservation
- Status: Operational
- Opening date: 1940

Mmakgodumo Dam, also known as Bathoen Dam, is a dam located in Kanye, in Botswana's Southern District. It was constructed in 1940 under the leadership of Bathoen II, the paramount chief of the Bangwaketse, as part of early water management and irrigation development initiatives in the area. The dam remains an important feature of Kanye’s cultural and ecological landscape and is associated with tourism, local heritage, and wildlife conservation.

== History ==
Mmakgodumo Dam was constructed in 1940 under Kgosi Bathoen II as part of efforts to address water scarcity and support agricultural production in Kanye. The dam formed the basis of an irrigation scheme that supplied vegetables and other produce for local consumption, including school feeding initiatives during the early 1940s. The dam is regarded as one of the earliest community-driven irrigation projects in the region and is closely linked to Bathoen II’s broader development vision for Kanye.

== Bird sanctuary ==
In 1992, the area surrounding the dam was gazetted as the Bathoen Dam Bird Sanctuary under the Department of Wildlife and National Parks. The sanctuary was established to promote conservation and sustainable tourism while protecting the dam’s ecological environment.The sanctuary supports a range of bird species and wildlife associated with the dam and surrounding woodland. It is used for recreational activities including birdwatching, fishing, and nature-based tourism.

== Tourism and cultural significance ==
Mmakgodumo Dam is a notable tourism site in the Kanye area. It is associated with local folklore, cultural heritage, and natural attractions such as nearby gorges and forested areas.The site is part of broader efforts to promote cultural tourism in the Southern District and is linked to community-based heritage initiatives.

== Conservation ==
Environmental management of the dam area includes efforts to maintain water levels and manage surrounding vegetation. Studies and local reports have highlighted concerns regarding eucalyptus overgrowth, which has been addressed through controlled management initiatives aimed at protecting the dam’s ecological balance.

== See also ==
- Kanye
- Bathoen II
- List of dams and reservoirs in Botswana
