= North-South Carrier =

Water pipeline in Botswana

- Botswana showing the NSC route, and proposed extension from the Zambezi

Location
- Country: Botswana
- State: Central District
- Coordinates: 21.85183°S 27.731989°E
- Direction: North-South
- Start: Letsibogo Dam
- Passes through: Selebi-Phikwe, Palapye, Mahalapye
- To: Gaborone

General information
- Type: Water
- Operator: Water Utilities Corporation
- Commissioned: 2000

Technical information
- Length: 360 km (220 mi)
- Diameter: 1,400 mm (55 in)
- No. of pumping stations: 4
- Pumping stations: Letsibogo, Moralane, Palapye, Serorame Valley

The North-South Carrier (NSC) is a pipeline in Botswana that carries raw water south for a distance of 360 kilometres (220 mi) to the capital city of Gaborone. Phase 1 was completed in 2000. Phase 2 of the NSC, under construction, will duplicate the pipeline to carry water from the Dikgatlhong Dam, which was completed in 2012. A proposed extension to deliver water from the Zambezi would add another 500 to 520 kilometres (310 to 320 mi) to the total pipeline length. The NSC is the largest engineering project ever undertaken in Botswana.

== Climate ==
Botswana has an arid climate, with little in the way of surface water supplies. Until recently, groundwater wells were used to meet about 80% of the demand for water. Some of the groundwater accumulated long ago when the climate was wetter. "Groundwater mining" is not sustainable in areas where the water is not being renewed from the surface. The more populous eastern portion of Botswana lies in the Limpopo River basin, which is considered "closed". In the South African portion of the basin, water usage exceeds the potential water yield from the basin by 800 million cubic metres (650,000 acre-feet) annually. Water has to be imported from the Vaal River to make up the shortfall.

Almost all rainfall occurs in the summer months of October through April, at a time when temperatures over 30 °C (86 °F) cause high levels of evaporation. Rainfall is undependable. A drought period may last for several years. Precipitation is highest in the northeast, at about 690 millimetres (27 in) annually, and lowest in the southwest, at about 250 millimetres (9.8 in) annually. Annual average potential evaporation (Note: Potential evaporation is the amount that evaporates from a sheet of open water such as a reservoir. In a dry country, the amount of rain that falls on a reservoir each year may be less than the amount that evaporates, but the reservoir is viable if the water supplied by rainfall and runoff from its catchment basin is greater than the amount lost through evaporation and demand.) is about 2,000 millimetres (79 in) annually. Botswana has a flat terrain that is mostly unsuitable for reservoirs.

== Requirements ==
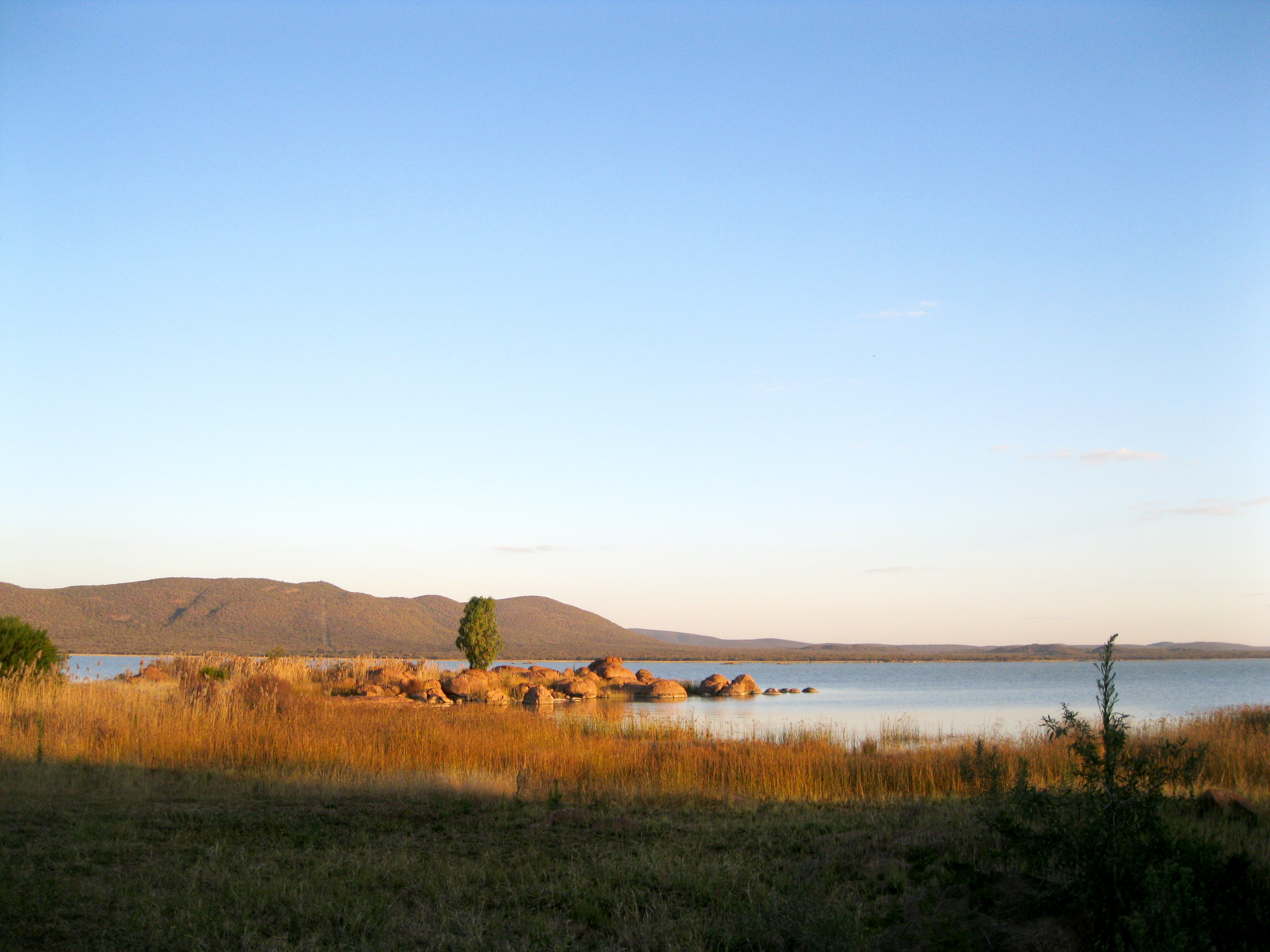
The Gaborone Dam is insufficient to meet Gaborone's growing demand for water.

In 2008 Botswana had a population of 1,921,000. GDP per capita on a purchasing power parity (PPP) basis was $13,415. 83% of the people were literate. The percentage of people with access to safe drinking water rose from 77% to 96% between 1996 and 2006. The economy of Botswana is growing fast, as is the population, particularly in the Gaborone area. This is causing growth in per-capita demand for water, and rapid growth in total demand. The Gaborone region accounts for over 75% of water demand in eastern Botswana. The local Gaborone and Bokaa dams cannot meet the growing demand even with the help of reclamation from the Gaborone Water Treatment Works at Glen Valley.

Morupule Colliery uses three boreholes for water, but takes water from the NSC when needed through a 17 kilometres (11 mi) pipeline from Palapye. Exploitation of coal deposits in Botswana related to the South African Waterberg coalfield will also contribute to demand for water. Water from the Dikgatlhong Dam, completed in 2012, will be used in part to supply the large coalfield and power station at Mmamabula via the NSC pipeline.

== Plan ==
Route of the North-South Carrier

The Botswana National Water Master Plan (NWMP) identified promising sites for reservoirs in the northeast on the small, ephemeral (Note: The Motlouse is an ephemeral sand river, as are many rivers in Botswana. Surface flows are only seen during the wet season. Sub-surface flow in the sandy bed continues throughout the year.) Motloutse and Shashe tributaries of the Limpopo River. The North-South Carrier Water Project was launched to build a pipeline that would carry water from these sites to the area of highest demand around Gaborone in the southeast.

A 1994 review of environmental assessments conducted for the Norwegian Agency for Development Cooperation, which provided some of the funding for the project, concluded that the impact of the pipeline would be tolerable. The pipe would be buried. Native vegetation would soon regenerate along the route if the topsoil and subsoil were carefully removed and replaced without mixing. Plans for construction of the 28 metres (92 ft) high rock-filled Letsibogo Dam on the Motloutse River also included careful environmental impact assessment studies. The impact of the Letsibogo reservoir on an ecology that has not been carefully studied would be greater. It would both destroy and create habitat. The review was cautious in its conclusions about the net impact. The review said "the socio-economic and archaeological issues seem to have been handled in a particularly outstanding way".

The plan was divided into two phases. The Letsibogo Dam would be built in Phase 1, with a pipeline about 360 kilometres (220 mi) to carry the raw water south to a treatment plant and master balancing reservoir at Mmamashia, about 15 kilometres (9.3 mi) northeast of Gaborone. An early version of the plan used the existing Bokaa Dam as the reservoir, but it was decided to instead build a covered reservoir closer to Gaborone to minimise loss of water through evaporation. A second dam, the Dikgatlhong Dam, would be built on the Sashe River in Phase 2. A second pipeline running parallel to the first would carry the water to the same treatment plant and reservoir near Gaborone.

The Phase 1 pipeline transported water from the Letsibogo Dam along the eastern road and rail corridor to Gaborone. The pipeline plan included four pumping stations and a water treatment plant at the terminus just north of Gaborone. The pipeline was to have pumping stations at Letsibogo, Moralane, Palapye and Serorome Valley. The Serorome station was later deferred to a future upgrade. There would be break-pressure tanks at Moralane, Thoti Hill, Mameno and Lose Hill. Towns and large villages along the route would be fed by raw water taken from the pipeline at Palapye, supplying Moropule and Serowe, and at Mahalapye, supplying Kalamare and Shoshong. Water from wellfields would be injected into the pipeline at Palla Road and Mmamabula, and water would also be injected from the Bokaa Dam.

== Construction ==
=== NSC-1 ===
The Letsibogo Dam was designed for the Ministry of Minerals, Energy and Water Resources by Arup, who also supervised construction of the water storage embankment and central clay-core dam. Letsibogo has storage capacity of 100 million cubic metres (3.5 billion cu ft). J. Burrow provided engineering services including designs, contract documents, managing the tendering process and managing construction of the NSC-1 pipeline.

Pipe diameters in NSC-1 ranged from 1.4 metres (4 ft 7 in) down to 1.1 metres (3 ft 7 in). The pipe was made of alternating sections of glass-reinforced plastic (fiberglass) and steel. It was placed in a trench, bedded in sand and buried, within a 30 metres (98 ft) wide easement corridor. The project included installing the pipeline itself, as well as pumping stations, water treatment plants, storage and balancing reservoirs, measurement and control systems and infrastructure. Construction took five years. The North South Carrier Scheme cost about US$350 million, and started operation in 2000.

There were problems in laying the glass-reinforced piping, which caused the original January 1999 target completion date to be missed. A revised target date of June 2000 was also missed, with further delays caused by failures of the pipeline and pumping station equipment. These caused cost increases from the original estimate of P1,200 million to around P1,500 million. Since opening, NSC-1 has had ongoing reliability problems. In April 2012 a man who was prospecting for minerals entered the pipeline corridor and caused the pipe to burst, sending a stream of about 1,000 liters (220 imp gal; 260 U.S. gal) a second pouring into the surrounding land to form a deep crater. Water supplies in the region were cut off until repairs could be made.

=== NSC-2 ===
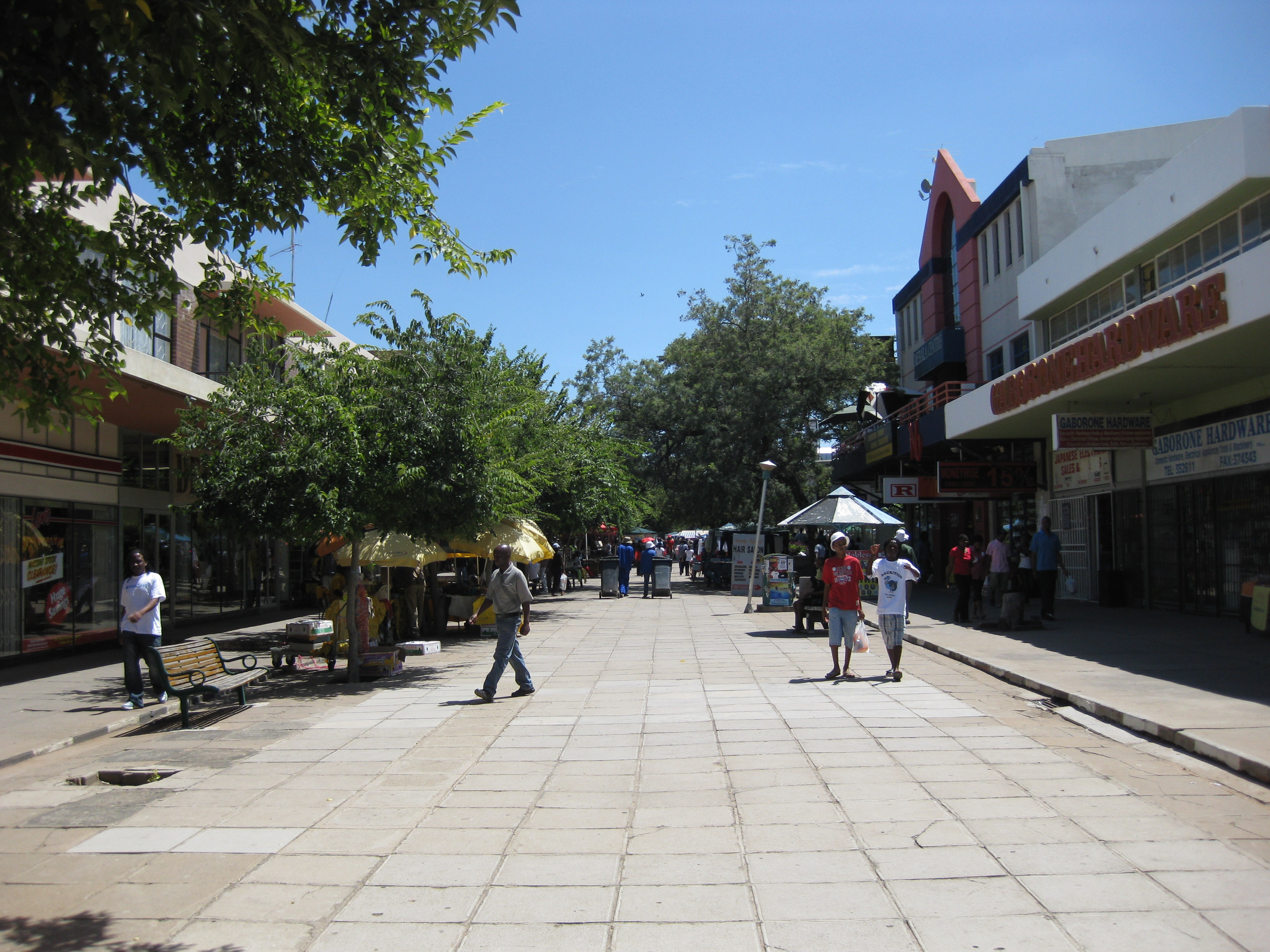
The Main Mall, a pedestrian-only street in downtown Gaborone

In the original plans, NSC-2 would deliver 45 million cubic metres (1.6 billion cu ft) annually at a cost of P5.5 billion. Construction of the Dikgatlhong Dam on the lower Shashe River began in March 2008 and was completed slightly ahead of schedule in December 2011. This is a zoned earthfill structure, 41 metres (135 ft) high and 4.5 kilometres (2.8 mi) long, with potential storage capacity of 400 million cubic metres (14 billion cu ft), almost three times that of the Gaborone Dam. The dam will start impounding the Shashe River during the 2012–2013 rainy season. The first portion of the NSC-2 pipeline, NSC-2A, will connect the Dikgatlhong Dam to the NSC 1 Break Pressure Tank 1 at Moralane.

With a troubled world economy, the Botswana government decided that between 2010 and 2016 they would focus on completing the NSC-2.1 section and upgrading NSC-1. Construction of NSC-2.2 from Moralane up to Palapye would be deferred to the 2017–2022 budget period. NSC-2.1 delivers water from a new storage reservoir at Palapye to a new reservoir at Mmamashia via two new pumping stations. The NSC-1 upgrades would include introducing variable-speed drives at the existing pumping stations and installing a new pumping station, as well as upgrades to transfer links and treatment works at the south end of the pipeline. Initial planning also started for NSC-3, another pipeline in the same corridor. The three independent pipelines would provide greater security and redundancy, although they would be operated using an integrated communication and control system.

In June 2012, stakeholders were told that construction of the NSC-2A pipeline to connect the Dikgatlhong Dam to the NSC was behind schedule. This part of the project had started in October 2011 and was due for completion in October 2013. The contractors, China State Construction Engineering Corp and the local Excavator Hire, had 350 employees, 75 of whom were Chinese. The delay was caused by failure of a factory in Palapye to produce pipes of acceptable quality. There were some concerns that further delays could occur if there were problems with blasting along the section from the Letsibogo Dam to the Moralane break-pressure tank and pumping station. Along this stretch, the new pipeline runs parallel to the NSC-1 pipeline, and great care must be taken to ensure no damage is done to the existing pipeline.

== Zambezi potential ==
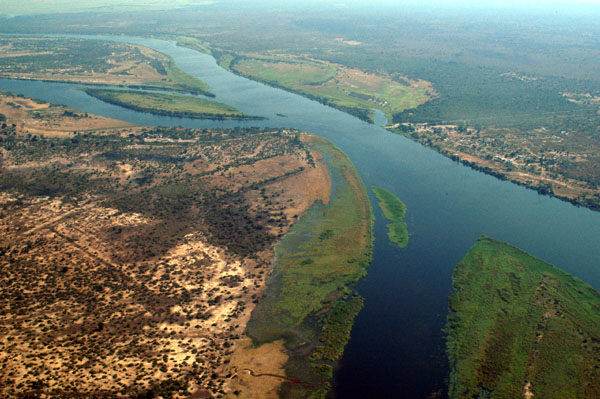
The Zambezi river at Kazungula, a quadripoint where Namibia, Zambia, Zimbabwe and Botswana meet

In the 1980s and early 1990s the Botswana and South African governments began discussing the possibility of drawing water from the Zambezi River and feeding it into the North-South Carrier. Some of this water could be passed on to South Africa. The two countries even speculated about "diverting the Zambezi River at Kazungula", a prospect that was not welcomed by the other members of the Southern African Development Community (SADC). Eventually the question of claims on the Zambezi water were settled by the 1995 SADC protocol on shared Watercourse Systems and establishment of the Zambezi River Authority. However, the commitment of member governments to honor the agreement seems weak and may not stand up to the pressures of climate change.

Under the agreement, the Botswana government has a large allocation of water from the Zambezi near Kasane. The NWMP included plans for the Chobe/Zambezi Transfer scheme, taking about 495 million cubic metres (400,000 acre-feet) annually from the Zambezi for use in agriculture by 2022. In a 2010 report, the Ministry of Minerals, Energy and Water Resources noted that Botswana might need more Zambezi water to meet expected urban demand by 2020. The ministry expected to implement the Chobe/Zambezi Transfer scheme earlier, and to link it up to the NSC. Botswana had discussed plans to extract the water at various Zambezi Watercourse Commission meetings, and had received no objections.

The first phase of the project would deliver the water to the Pandamatenga area for agricultural use, and the second phase would carry water from Pandamatenga south to the NSC. The pipeline would run via Francistown to join the NSC at Break Pressure Tank 1 (Moralane). Depending on the route selected, it would be 500 to 520 kilometres (310 to 320 mi) long. The Botswana government notes that the pipeline development could serve the needs of neighboring countries. The station that extracts water from the Zamebezi could also supply a pipeline to Namibia. Some of the water could be pumped from Francistown to Bulawayo in Zimbabwe.

== Criticism ==
Transfer of water to meet the needs of thirsty regions like that around Gaborone may have negative impacts on the poor riparian communities that will lose water. It is possible that transferring water-intensive industries to water-rich regions may be a more cost-effective approach with lower impact on the environment. The 1996 SADC agreement in power pooling may be seen as a model for this alternative approach. Botswana's diamond reserves will not last forever, and international demand and prices are unpredictable. Botswana must diversify the economy to make other businesses more profitable and to become more competitive in the regional economic zone. The estimated US$120 million spent on Phase 1 of the North-South Carrier could perhaps have been better allocated to other projects, with the government charging more realistic rates to encourage consumers to reduce their water usage, and with more emphasis on efficient use of existing supplies. Still, spending some of Botswana's diamond revenues on improved water supply is clearly popular among voters.
