= Dikgatlhong Dam =

Dam near Robelela, on the Shashe River in Botswana

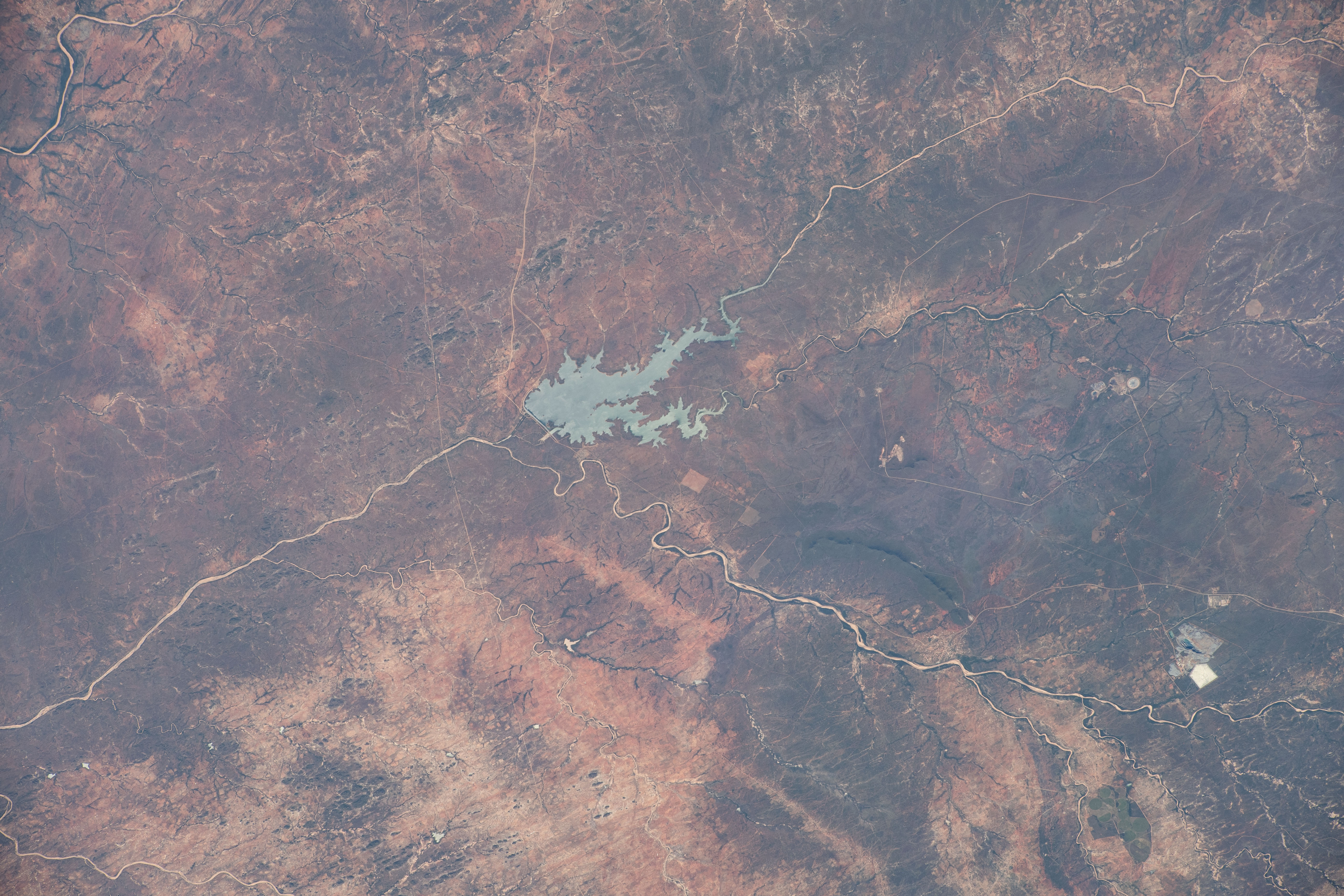

- Location within Botswana
- Country: Botswana
- Coordinates: 21.549008°S 27.981034°E
- Purpose: Urban water supply
- Construction began: March 2008
- Opening date: January 2012
- Construction cost: $300 million
- Owner: Government of Botswana

Dam and spillways
- Type of dam: Earth fill
- Height: 41 metres (135 ft)
- Length: 4.6 kilometres (2.9 mi)
- Spillway type: Concrete ogee
- Spillway capacity: 11,000 m^{3}/s

Reservoir
- Total capacity: 4,000,000,000 cubic metres (1.4×10^{11} cu ft)
- Maximum length: 20 kilometres (12 mi)

The Dikgatlhong Dam is a dam near the village of Robelela on the Shashe River in Botswana, completed in December 2011. When full, it holds 400,000,000 cubic metres (1.4×10^{10} cu ft) of water. The next largest dam in Botswana, the Gaborone Dam, has a capacity of 141,000,000 cubic metres (5.0×10^{9} cu ft).

== Description and Use ==
The dam is located on the Shashe River three kilometers below the confluence with the Tati River, about 55 kilometres (34 mi) northeast of the town of Selebi Phikwe. It is 5 kilometres (3.1 mi) upstream of the Botswana - Zimbabwe border. The project should increase the secure supply of water for Gaborone, Francistown, and towns and villages along the north–south route for the foreseeable future. It will eventually deliver another 3,000 litres (660 imp gal; 790 US gal) per second of raw water delivery to the north–south carrier pipeline. Water will also be fed to the Palapye coalfields and to the proposed 1,200 MW power station at Mmamabula. Project costs for the dam were around P1,134 million (US$300 million). The pipeline would cost another P1,127 million. The reservoir may also attract tourists drawn by wildlife, water sports and local food, if facilities are developed.

== Structure ==
The dam is a zoned earthfill structure, 41 metres (135 ft) high and 4.5 kilometres (2.8 mi) long. The earthworks contain about 3,870,000 cubic metres (137,000,000 cu ft) of material, including 550,000 cubic metres (19,000,000 cu ft) of clay core from borrow pits and 2,460,000 cubic metres (87,000,000 cu ft) of embankment shell obtained from the spillway channel excavation. The quality of available clay was marginal and required careful selection, treatment and quality control. A layer of broken rock riprap 1.5 metres (4 ft 11 in) thick protects the upstream side from wave action, and a layer of less coarse rockfill 0.5 metres (1 ft 8 in) thick protects the downstream side. The rock, and aggregate for concrete production, came from an on-site quarry.

The geology of the reservoir is very variable. A 58 kilometres (36 mi) long grout curtain incorporating 6,700 tonnes of cement was needed to seal against leakage. The main spillway is a concrete ogee structure 200 metres (660 ft) long with energy dissipators, on the upper left flank of the dam about 2 kilometres (1.2 mi) north of the river. There is also a 900 metres (3,000 ft) long auxiliary spillway to handle conditions of extreme flooding. When filled, the reservoir will have backwater reach of about 20 kilometres (12 mi) up river.

A 48 metres (157 ft) high concrete intake tower 7 metres (23 ft) in diameter with five gate openings feeds a 260 metres (850 ft) long steel pipe 3 metres (9.8 ft) in diameter that passes under the dam embankment and then splits to a pump station and a river outlet. A 61 metres (200 ft) steel bridge connects the intake tower to the top of the dam embankment. The project also included building housing and power supply, and upgrading 44 kilometres (27 mi) of road between the villages of Mmadinare and Robelela. As of 2012 the pump station had yet to be built, as had the 75 kilometres (47 mi) long 1.2 metres (3 ft 11 in) pipeline to carry raw water to the existing North-South Carrier Pipeline (NSC), which in turn carries water south to Gaborone. The pipeline will connect to the NSC at the BPT1 break pressure tank at Moralane.

== Construction ==
Before construction could begin, the bodies of people buried in the Matopi and Robelela villages had to be exhumed and relocated. This was explained at village dikgotla meetings to gain community approval. Some farms were purchased upstream. The government also arranged for counselling services on AIDS both to construction workers and to residents of the Mmadinare, Robelela, Matopi, Matsiloje, Chokwe and Patayamatebele villages. Preparations were made for additional demands for health and policing services.

A joint venture of Bergstan Africa of Botswana and Jeffares & Green of South Africa undertook technical design and construction supervision. The dam was built for the Department of Water Affairs by Sinohydro Corporation of China. At times, the language barrier caused problems, when the engineers were unsure whether the contractor understood what was required, since interpreters without technical training were being used. PPC Cement of Botswana supplied cement. Concrete was manufactured onsite using onsite quarries.

Construction began in March 2008. Unseasonal flooding in the dry season in June 2009 disrupted the construction project. The contractor managed to recover lost time through hiring additional workers. Sinohydro announced completion in December 2011, ahead of the planned February 2012 date. Sinohydro received a takeover certificate in January 2012. A diversion channel was left open in the embankment for the river flow while the dam was built over the Shashe River. Final closure of the diversion channel and the spillway was scheduled for October 2012 in time to start impounding the wet season's rains.

In June 2012, stakeholders were told that construction of the pipeline was behind schedule. This part of the project had started in October 2011 and was due for completion in October 2013. The contractors, China State Construction Engineering Corp and the local Excavator Hire, had 350 employees, 75 of whom were Chinese. The delay was caused by failure of a factory in Palapye to produce pipes of acceptable quality. There were some concerns that further delays could occur if there were problems with blasting along the section from the Letsibogo Dam to Moralane. Along this stretch, the new pipeline runs parallel to the NSC pipeline, and great care must be taken to ensure no damage is done to the NSC.

== Sources ==
- "$300m dam in Botswana to be complete by 2012". Engineering News. 16 July 2010. Archived from the original on 21 July 2010.
- "Dikgatlhong dam". Jeffares & Green. Archived from the original on 29 September 2012.
- "Dikgatlhong dam construction reaches critical stage : Construction Review". Jeffares & Green. January 2012.
- "Dikgatlhong Dam has much tourism potential". The Botswana Gazette. 17 November 2009. Archived from the original on 22 December 2010.
- Kedikilwe, Ponatshego H.K. (1 February 2008). "Statement ... on the occasion of the Ground-breaking Ceremony ... of the Polometsi/Dikgatlhong Dam and Housing component, Robelela Village" (PDF). Archived from the original (PDF) on 5 March 2016.
- Maganu, Patricia (24 August 2009). "Dikgatlhong Dam Behind Schedule". Mmegi.
- Modikwa, Onalenna (13 December 2011). "Dikgatlhong dam complete ahead of schedule". Mmegi. Archived from the original on 21 June 2015.
- Modikwa, Onalenna (22 June 2012). "More delays in Dikgatlhong Dam pipeline". Mmegi.
- B. Paya; G.T. Matsiara; I.J. Bettesworth; M. van der Walt; P. du Plessis; B. Bosman; D. Stephenson; N. Mbayi; A. Keabetswe (2012). "BOTSWANA'S NORTH SOUTH CARRIER 2 WATER TRANSFER SCHEME" (PDF). WISA 2012 conference. Archived from the original (PDF) on 3 March 2016.
- Pepperell, Andy (September 2009). "Dikgatlhong Dam - IMIESA".
