= Ntimbale Dam =

- Location within Botswana
- Country: Botswana
- Location: North-East District
- Coordinates: 20.867795°S 27.448946°E
- Purpose: Urban water supply

Dam and spillways
- Height: 34 metres (112 ft)
- Spillway type: Ogee

Reservoir
- Total capacity: 26,000,000 cubic metres (920,000,000 cu ft)

The Ntimbale Dam is a dam on the Tati River in Botswana. It has a capacity of 26,000,000 cubic metres (920,000,000 cu ft).

== Construction ==
The dam project was assigned to Knight Piésold by the Botswana Department of Water Affairs. Piésold undertook the feasibility study in 1996–97, assisted in the tender process, prepared the detailed design and supervised construction between 2004 and 2009. The dam is a roller-compacted concrete dam 34 metres (112 ft) high, with a central ogee spillway. PPC Cement of South Africa, which has a blending and packing plant in Gaborone, supplied the cement for the project. The dam complex includes pump stations and a water treatment plant, and supplies water to villages in the North East District and neighboring parts of the Central District.

The dam cost an estimated P205 million. While it was being built, a water-transfer scheme costing P280 million was undertaken to connect all of the 51 villages in the North East District. President Ian Khama commissioned the dam at a ceremony in October 2008, voicing the hope that it would meet domestic water supply needs for the next twenty years. He cautioned that people should continue to use water carefully and avoid waste.

== Sources ==
- Central Statistics Office (October 2009). "BOTSWANA WATER STATISTICS" (PDF). Archived from the original on 7 July 2010.
- Madlala, Ollie (15 September 2006). "SA company secures Botswana government's cement-supply contract". Engineering News.
- "Ntimbale Dam Project". Knight Piésold.
- Kologwe, Obusitse (26 October 2008). "Ntimbale Dam to benefit North East region at last". Sunday Standard.
