= Vukwi =

- Village
- Location within Botswana
- Coordinates: 20.6012°S 27.3867°E

Population (2011)
  - Total: 369
- Time zone: UTC+2 (Central Africa Time)
  - Summer (DST): UTC+2 (not observed)
- Climate: BSh

Vukwi is a village in the North-East District of Botswana. In 2001, the population was 263. In 2011, the population was 369.
