= Ramokgwebana =

- Village
- Location within Botswana
- Coordinates: 20.588177°S 27.651233°E
- Country: Botswana
- District: North East District
- Ward: Ditladi ward
- Time zone: UTC+2 (Central Africa Time)
  - Summer (DST): UTC+2 (not observed)
- Climate: BSh

Ramokgwebana is a village in the North-East District of Botswana, close to the eastern border, which is defined by the Ramokgwebana River. Plumtree, Zimbabwe is on the other side of the border crossing.

The village is connected to Francistown to the south by an 80 kilometres (50 mi) road surfaced in bitumen that was completed by Sinohydro Corporation in 2012. Ramokgwebana lies at the northern end of the only railway line in Botswana, which runs from Ramatlabama on the South African border north through Lobatse, Gaborone, Pilane, Mahalapye, Palapye, Serule, and Francistown. Trains once ran along this line from Johannesburg to Bulawayo in Zimbabwe, but that service no longer operates.

In May 2011 another outbreak of foot-and-mouth disease was reported in the Ramokgwebana area, a month after an outbreak was reported in Matsiloje, another village on the Zimbabwe border.
