= Zwenshambe =

- Village
- Location within Botswana
- Coordinates: 20.5092°S 27.4263°E
- Country: Botswana
- District: North-East

Population (2011)
  - Total: 1,943
- Time zone: UTC+2 (Central Africa Time)
  - Summer (DST): UTC+2 (not observed)
- Climate: BSh

Zwenshambe is a village in the North-East District of Botswana. It is situated between Gungwe village in the west, Nlapkhwane village in the east, Mulambakwena village in the south and the Zimbabwe border in the north. It is not far from the Ramokgwebana Border Post. The nearest city to Zwenshambe is Francistown which is also the second largest city in Botswana.

== Language ==
People from Zwenshambe speak Kalanga language.

== Schools ==
There is a primary school, a community junior secondary school and a brigade in Zwenshambe. The Zwenshambe Community Junior Secondary School was completed in 1983 but started operating in 1985.

== Demographics ==
The population in 2001 was 1,468. The population in 2011 was 1,943.
