= Talaote tribe =

African ethnic group

Talaote are an ethnic group found in the central district of Botswana and southwestern parts of Zimbabwe. They are part of a large group of ethnic groups called Bakalanga. Over the years the Batalaote lost their language, and those in Zimbabwe adopted Kalanga while those in Botswana adopted Sengwato. The Talaunda and the Wadoma could share a common ancestor. Both tribes have significantly high cases of ectrodactyly.

Talaote (sometimes spelled "Talaunda"), meaning "glance back while trudging on," are a large tribe even though they are divided and live in various parts of Botswana and Western Zimbabwe. They are Rozvi/Lozi/Lozvi people, and their totem is a heart/pelo/moyo and they do not pierce their ears. They are a peaceful tribe which migrated from Zimbabwe; they came from the same region in East Africa as the Shona. They fled Zimbabwe to Senyawe in Botswana because of the intertribal wars. They lived with the Bangwato when they settled in Botswana. Some of them accompanied Ratiltadi and Mpoengs, who fled from Kgama into Plumtree, Zimbabwe. The Rozvi are the people from where the Mambo dynasty emerged. It is now thought that these Kalanga/Rozvi/Lozi/Lozvi people built the Mapungubwe and Great Zimbabwe ruins.

The Gululu are a smaller family within the Talaunda; their origin dates back to the aftermath of a genocide attempt by King Mzilikazi after Kedikilwe, brother of Musemwe, misled the King on the whereabouts of herds of cattle that belonged to the Talaunda and the Bangwato in Botswana. The survivors of that attack adopted the name Gululu or Gwababa in SiNdebele, as the king's warriors had unwittingly mistaken rustling noises in the bushes made by these Talaunda for creeping Monitor lizards (called Gululu in Kalanga).

Their first settlement in Botswana was in a small village northeast of Botswana called Senyawe, where they lived on a hill. As of 2010 Batalaote are still in Senyawe village. They were divided due to the search for greener pastures, intertribal marriage, and intertribal wars. That is why there are some Batalaote in Plumtree, Matopos, Serowe, Mmadinare, Makaleng, Bobirwa.

Several of the Talaote/Talaunda people seek government-assisted repatriation from their current locations to locations that are governed by Talaote chiefs and tribal princes.

Bakalanga-Banyai, just like any other African tribe, has dialects; their dialects are

- Badhalaunda/batalaote (they lived in Madzilogwe, Mazhoubgwe, up to Zhozhobgwe.)
- BaNambya can be found in Hwange up to Gweta.
- BaLilima ( BaWombe; Bayela. Are in the central district with Baperi
- Baperi (live together with BaLilima as mentioned above)

Dhalaunda was the leader of one of these Kalanga sub-tribes, and the clan was named after him, originally Badhalaunda, but then Bangwato changed it to Batalaote, as they changed Bakalanga to Bakalaka, maybe because of difficulty pronouncing the Kalanga words. They are found in the central district of Botswana and southwestern parts of Zimbabwe. Over the years the Talaunda dialect was leveled to other Ikalanga dialects, just as the northeastern Tjikalanga dialect is shifting to Tjililma. Some of them live in Serowe; former President of Botswana, Festus Mogae, is a member. These have completely lost their Ikalanga identity, and now just identify themselves as Talaote or Ngwato, with little knowledge of what Talaote really means. Most of the Talaote tribe who witnessed the conflicts between their rulers fled Botswana for South Africa. Most Batalaota are currently found in the Malebogo District in the Blouberg Municipality.
