= Letsholathebe =

Letsholathebe may refer to:

- Douglas Letsholathebe, Botswana politician
- Ndiapo Letsholathebe (born 1983), Botswana footballer
- Letsholathebe II Memorial Hospital, in Maun, Botswana
