= Zambezi Watercourse Commission =

Intergovernmental water management organization

- Formation: 13 July 2004; 22 years ago
- Type: IGO
- Purpose: Water/power resource management
- Headquarters: Harare, Zimbabwe
- Website: http://www.zambezicommission.org/

The Zambezi Watercourse Commission (ZAMCOM) is a water management organization established by member states of the Southern African Development Community (SADC) whose territory contains the Zambezi river basin.

== Zambezi River ==
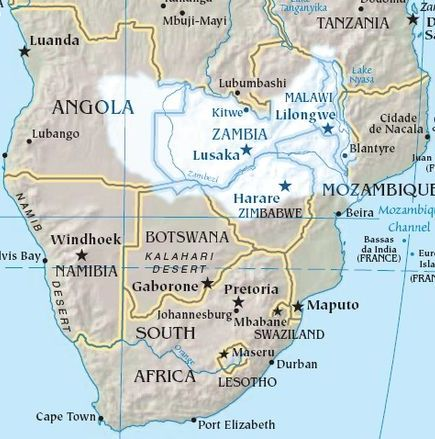
Zambezi River Basin

The Zambezi originates in northwestern Zambia, and runs west and then southwest through Angola before reentering Zambia. It flows south and forms part of the border between Zambia and Namibia. After picking up the waters of the Chobe River at the quadripoint where Zambia, Namibia, Botswana and Zimbabwe meet, the river flows east along the border between Zambia and Zimbabwe, powering the shared Kariba Dam hydroelectric station, before entering Mozambique and flowing to the Indian Ocean. The Zambezi basin also includes parts of Malawi and Tanzania. The Zambezi is the fourth largest river in Africa after the Nile, Congo and Niger.

== Organisation ==
The eight Zambezi Basin riparian states that participate in ZAMCOM are Angola, Botswana, Malawi, Mozambique, Namibia, Tanzania, Zambia and Zimbabwe. ZAMCOM operations are in line with the revised SADC Protocol on Shared Watercourses. The SADC Protocol was adopted in 1995 and by SADC member states, including all Zambezi riparian states, and came into force in 1998. Seven of the riparian states signed the ZAMCOM Agreement on 13 July 2004 at Kasane in Botswana. Zambia committed to signing after further national consultation before the August 2004 SADC Summit, but it did not sign the agreement. The agreement came into force in June 2011 without Zambia having signed and without key institutions such as the Council of Ministers and a Permanent Secretariat having been set up.

The Interim ZAMCOM Secretariat (IZS) based in Gaborone, Botswana, was established in May 2011. The IZS, headed by an Executive Secretary, is financially supported by the Norwegian Government, and has the objective of making the ZAMCOM Agreement operational and establishing its Permanent Secretariat. It is given strategic guidance and oversight by the Ministers responsible for Water in the member countries. In May 2013 at a meeting of SADC Water Ministers in Luanda, Angola, the ZAMCOM Council of Ministers was established and Zimbabwe was designed to host the Commission’s headquarters, the permanent Secretariat. The Ministerial Council elected Angola to serve as a chair for one year. Zambia announced at the meeting that it was "ready to join the commission".

== Objectives and activities ==
The purpose of ZAMCOM is "to promote the equitable and reasonable utilization of the water resources of the Zambezi Watercourse as well as the efficient management and sustainable development thereof". Poverty reduction is the first priority of SADC, and ZAMCOM has a primary goal of poverty reduction through the shared water resource. ZAMCOM must address the concerns of downstream users over extraction of water upstream. Thus Mozambique is concerned that its prawn industry in the Zambezi delta is not affected by reduced flows, and that the Cahora Bassa hydroelectric plant receives sufficient water. Planned upstream water abstractions include the Matabeleland Zambezi Water Project in Zimbabwe that would bring water from the Zambezi to Bulawayo and its surrounding areas, as well as a proposed extension of the existing North-South Carrier in Botswana that would connect the carrier to the Zambezi River. Zambia and Namibia both have plans to expand irrigation in the upper river basin. South Africa, although not a riparian to the Zambezi river, also has plans to draw substantial amounts of water from the Zambezi River once the Lesotho Highlands Water Project is "fully developed".
