= Douglas Letsholathebe =

Botswana politician

Douglas Letsholathebe is a Motswana politician. A university physics lecturer by profession, he was elected to serve as a Member of Parliament for the Tati East constituency and was appointed as the Minister of Tertiary Education, Research, Science and Technology. In 2022 he was appointed Minister of Education and Skills Development in the Cabinet of Botswana by President Mokgweetsi Masisi.
