= Maunatlala =

Town in Botswana

- Village
- Interactive map of Maunatlala
- Coordinates: 22°35′44″S 27°37′37″E
- Country: Botswana
- District: Central

Population
  - Total: 3,862

Maunatlala is a settlement located in the Central District. It had a population of 3862 in the 2022 census. It is categorized as tertiary settlement III by the National Settlement Policy. The village is located about 88 kilometres (55 mi) east of Palapye.

== Geography and climate ==
Maunatlala is located within a tribal land under the administrative jurisdiction of the Ngwato Land Board through Maunatlala Subordinate Land Board. The village measures about 1,302 hectares (3,220 acres) in area. The village is the site of the Lotsane Dam. Maunatlala is approximately 30 kilometres (19 mi) from the South African border.

=== Topography ===
The village is located along the Lotsane River, in the foothills of the Tswapong Hills. The terrain elevation above sea level of the village is 856 meters. From the base of these hills the flood plains of the ephemeral Lotsane River drop gently northwards the river channel. A number of small washes and gullies emanating from the Tswapong Hills run across the flood plains towards the Lotsane River. The village of Maunatlala lies within the Limpopo drainage basin, of which the Lotsane River forms a part. The Lotsane River provides inflow to the Lotsane Dam in Maunatlala Village.

=== Vegetation ===
The dominant vegetation in the area is a mixed shrub and tree savanna with increasing tree density in connection with vegetation type found on hills and rivers. The type of tree savanna found on hills and rocky outcrops can broadly be divided into two; these are Moologa and Mokoba. The larger Mopane trees tend to grow on the inclines.

=== Animal Life ===
Cattle and goats dominate the large herbivore biomass in the Lotsane catchment area. Migratory wild ungulates such as wildebeest and hartebeest have perished and are now excluded from the area by extensive human acts throughout the region. Elephants are not found in the immediate area, but are known to occur further east.

=== Climate ===
The climate of Maunatlala area is semi-arid with dry winters and fairly wet summer months, with drought endemic. The average precipitation for the area is 440 mm. the minimum temp in the region ranges between 12.5 and 6 degrees Celsius. Maximum temperatures range between 21.5 and 40.5. Like the rest of the country, evaporation is very high and far exceeds rainfall. Data from Mahalapye meteorological station shows wind directions to be fairly constant throughout the year. Strong winds occur in association with thunderstorms during rainy season. Occasionally peak speeds of over50knots are recorded. Data shows that such winds are generally short lived.

== History ==
According to Maunatlala village elders, the Babirwa baga Maunatlala originate from South Africa near Blaauberg Hills, they migrated from South Africa under the leadership of Kgosi Mophato-a-Phukula. Due to wars between Bangwato and Mashona tribe, Babirwa baga Maunatlala were forced to relocate to Lepokole. While in Lepokole, Kgosi Sekgoma of Bangwato, father to Khama the III sent a delegation from his tribe to caution Kgosi Phukula that there is a certain Ndebele tribe led by King Mzilikazi who were on their way to the North and they were attacking any tribe that they came across, seizing livestock in the process. Lepokole was situated on the Mzilikazi route, it was crucial for Kgosi Mophato and tribe to relocate to Shoshong and Join Bangwato.

Baga Maunatlala stayed at Shoshong until the death of Kgosi Mophato, then relocated back to South Africa and settled at Ganana in 1876. Despite the fact that they had relocated to South Africa, they kept strong ties with Bangwato. In 1895 after the three Chiefs successfully securing protection against the Boers, Kgosi Khama sent a delegation to Kgosi Mapena who was leading the tribe at the time to inform him that a protectorate boundary has been set and he is outside the boundary. He was advised to cross into Botswana. Upon returning back to Botswana, they settled near a river called Kopung. The river was a source of drinking water for the tribe. They ended up naming the area Kopung.

As time passed by Kgosi Mapena’s eldest son who was named Maunatlala died, the village’ name was changed from Kopung to Maunatlala.

== Demographics ==
According to 2011 Housing and Population Census there were 4552 people in the village of Maunatlala and 4951 in Maunatlala and its associated localities. Maunatlala is second largest settlement in the Lerala-Maunatlala Constituency in terms of population size. The population of this settlement has grown by over 43% since 2001 an annual increase of around 4.3%. Economic Activity The economically active population comprises all persons of either sex who furnish the supply of labour for the production of goods and services during a specified period of time-reference period. According to Central Statistics Office (2011) most employees in Maunatlala are paid in cash and they constitute 21.8 % of the people. The Self-employed represent around 1.8 % of total active population.

== Education ==
It has three schools, two primary schools and a junior school. It also has a library that was opened in 2015. The primary schools are Masupe Primary School and Maunatlala Primary school. Its junior school also called Maunatlala Junior Secondary school. It offers form 1 up to form 3 classes. All of the schools are government owned. There are also numerous day care centres around the village including a pre-school/pre-classes at Maunatlala primary school.

== Sport ==
There are many football clubs in Maunatlala. There is Dinare Fc, Maunatlala United, Kopung Saints, Silver Stars fc, FC Hollywood, Lotsane fc and River Stones fc. The biggest teams are Dinare fc and Maunatlala United. They normally face each other on high tempo games during holidays especially during the MAGODIMO festive season tournaments. There are also several clubs for other sporting codes like volleyball and netball. In volleyball there is Zone 14.

== People from Maunatlala ==
- Mmereki Marakakgoro, gospel singer
- Samuel Outule, Ambassador of Botswana to the United States
