= Tshesebe =

- Village
- Location within Botswana
- Coordinates: 20.7322°S 27.5907°E

Population (2011)
  - Total: 2,379
- Time zone: UTC+2 (Central Africa Time)
  - Summer (DST): UTC+2 (not observed)
- Climate: BSh

Tshesebe is a village in the North-East District of Botswana. The population in 2001 was 1,519. The population in 2011 was 2,379.
