= Mogobane Dam =

- Location within Botswana
- Country: Botswana
- Location: South-East District
- Coordinates: 24.972885°S 25.700714°E
- Purpose: Irrigation

The Mogobane Dam is a dam on the Mogobane River in Botswana. The dam is used for irrigation and also supports a bird sanctuary.

== Origins ==
The Mogobane Irrigation Scheme was developed in the colonial era using Balete labor to build residential facilities, a warehouse and storerooms, the dam, canal and 50 hectares (120 acres) of irrigable fields. It was taken over by the district council in 1966. It was transferred to the Malete Land Board when it was formed in 1972, and then leased to the Botswana Development Corporation (BDC). In 2001, the irrigation farm was being sold. At a meeting in October 2003, the Balete were calling for the morafe to repossess the Mogobane Irrigation Scheme, which their grandparents had built on their land.

== Usage ==
The dam provides water for livestock and for the Mogobane village residents. As of 1982, the dam was infested with bilharzia snails and therefore cannot be used for swimming. The water must be boiled before being drunk. During times of heavy rainfall, the dam may overflow, flooding the adjoining Mogobane village.

== Waterbirds ==
There is a bird sanctuary bordering the dam to the west, with the goal of protecting birds that are not classified as game birds. The reservoir is home to a variety of bird life, with as many as seventy species being recorded at different times of the year including 11 species of herons and egrets, 14 species of ducks and geese and 24 species of waders. In summer the shallows are used by waders, and Black-headed and Grey Herons, Cattle Egret, Reed Cormorant and African Spoonbill breed in the reed beds in the center of the shallows when they are surrounded by water. Orange-breasted Waxbill and Fan-tailed Cisticola are found in the reeds and grasses around the reservoir.
