= Shashe Dam =

- Location within Botswana
- Country: Botswana
- Location: North-East District
- Coordinates: 21.366988°S 27.428268°E
- Purpose: Urban water supply
- Construction began: 1970
- Opening date: 1973

Dam and spillways
- Type of dam: Zoned embankment
- Height: 27 metres (89 ft)
- Length: 3.5 kilometres (2.2 mi)

Reservoir
- Total capacity: 85,000,000 cubic metres (3.0×10^{9} cu ft)
- Surface area: 3,200 hectares (7,900 acres)
- Maximum length: 15 kilometres (9.3 mi)
- Maximum width: 4.2 kilometres (2.6 mi)
- Normal elevation: 1,000 metres (3,300 ft)

The Shashe Dam is a dam on the Shashe River in Botswana that was built to supply water to the industrial city of Selebi-Phikwe. The large village of Tonota lies just south of the dam.

== Location and capacity ==
The dam impounds the Shashe River and is about 25 kilometres (16 mi) southwest of Francistown and about 80 kilometres (50 mi) northwest of Selebi-Phikwe. The Mairoro, Lunyi and Swiki tributaries of the Shashe also enter the reservoir.The artificial lake is 15 kilometres (9.3 mi) long and up to 4.2 kilometres (2.6 mi) wide. When full, the open-water surface covers almost 3,200 hectares (7,900 acres) and has a capacity of 85,000,000 cubic metres (3.0×10^{9} cu ft).

== Construction ==
The dam was built as part of a major investment in infrastructure required to exploit copper-nickel ore reserves at Selebi and Pikwe, estimated in October 1969 to total 45.7 million short tons. The 3.5 kilometres (2.2 mi) long, 27 metres (89 ft) high zoned embankment was completed in 1973. Water from the dam is brought to Selebi-Phikwe by an underground pipeline.

In 1982 it was found that groundwater from the local wells in Francistown had high levels of nitrate, and was also inadequate to meet public demand, so the public water supply for that city was changed over to using water from the Shashe Dam. The Shashe Dam water works, off the Francistown road to the north of the Tonota Development Plan Area, also supplies potable water to Tonota.

== Reservoir usage ==
The total potential yield of fish from the reservoir has been estimated at over 50 tonnes per year. The reservoir is used for subsistence, commercial and sports fishing, and also by a sailing club. Turtles, fish, otters, Nile monitors and many different birds inhabit the reservoir.

The dam shows traces of human pollution such as litter around and in the water. In February 2009 the Water Utilities Corporation was forced to suspend all public activities at the dam after an outbreak of cholera was traced to its water.
