= Lotsane River =

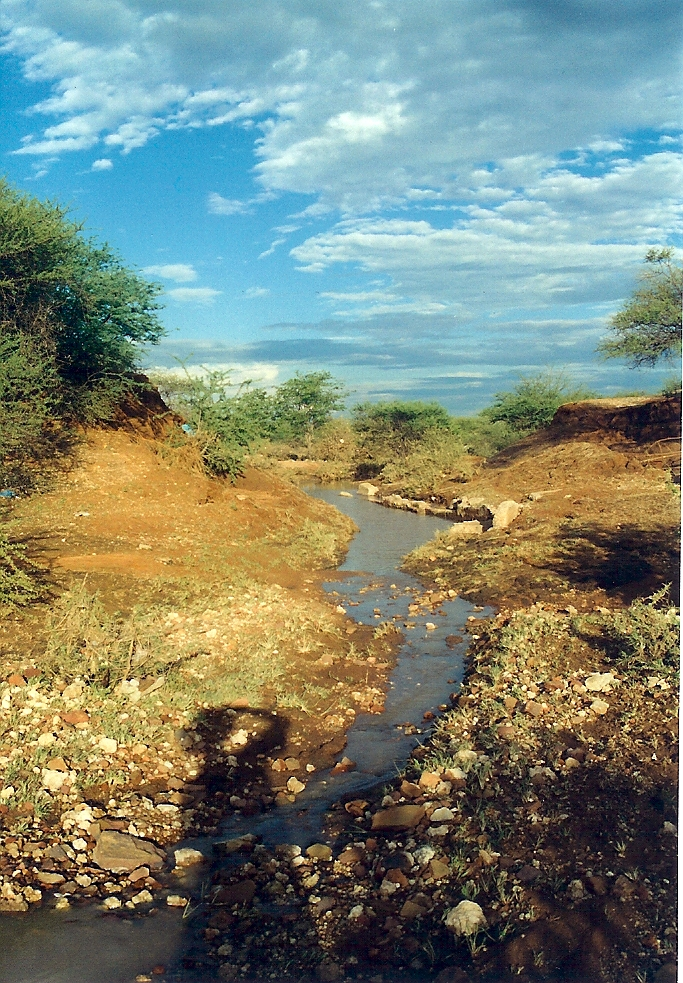
- Lotsane river near Palapye after a flood

- Location of the Lotsane River mouth

Location
- Country: Botswana

Physical characteristics
- Source: Kalahari
  - elevation: 1,300 m (4,300 ft)
- Mouth
  - location: Limpopo River, South Africa/Botswana border
  - coordinates: 22°40′42″S 28°11′25″E
  - elevation: 751 m (2,464 ft)
- Basin size: 9,748 km^{2} (3,764 sq mi)

The Lotsane River is a river in southeastern Botswana. It is a seasonal left hand tributary of the Limpopo River and has a catchment area of 9,748 square kilometres (3,764 sq mi).

== Course ==
The Lotsane has its source in the sandveld, at the eastern fringes of the Kalahari Desert. It flows roughly eastwards, passing close to Serowe and through Palapye and flanking the feet of the Tswapong Hills on their northern side near Maunatlala. Finally, it joins the left bank of the Limpopo River at the border with South Africa.

Its main tributaries are the Morupule River and the Kutswe River, the latter of which cuts across the Mokgware Hills, a mountain range that divides the watershed of the rivers flowing northeastwards, such as the Maitsokgwane, from those flowing southeastwards like the Mahalapswe. Other tributaries are the Dikabeya River and Susuela River, which join the Lotsane east of the Tswapong area.

All the rivers in the Lotsane basin are dry throughout the year, experiencing ephemeral flow during the summer rainy season. People in nearby areas collect water stored in the sandy riverbed.

There is one main dam in the Lotsane River. Currently, the construction of other dams is planned. According to the Water Utilities Corporation, as of March 2012 the Lotsane Dam was almost completed.

== Gallery ==
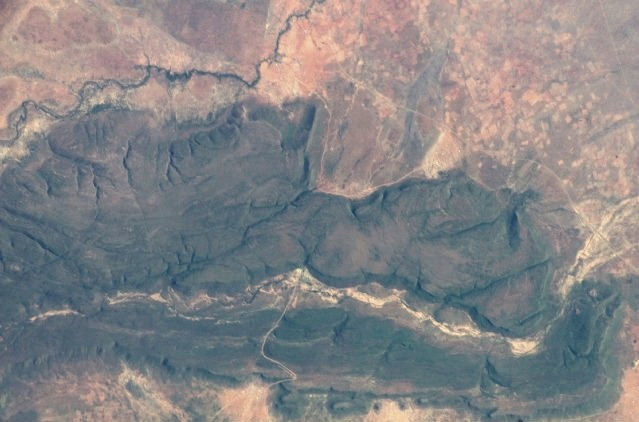
NASA picture of the Tswapong Hills with the Lotsane River flowing along the northern edge.

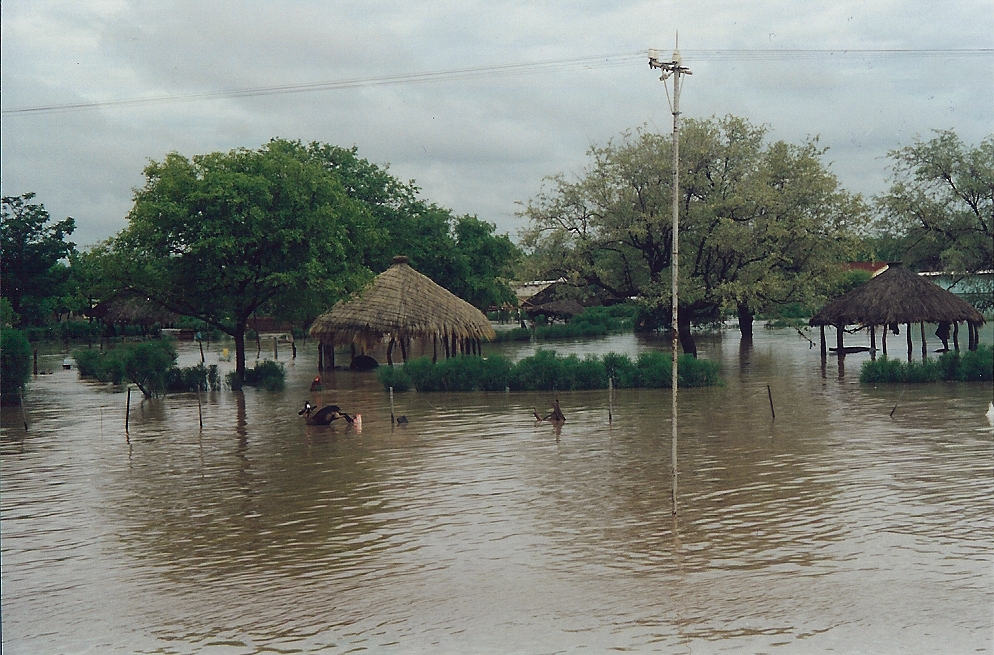
Flash flood in Palapye, Central District, Botswana. Heavy rain caused a small dam to burst on the Lotsane River, which flows through the village

== See also ==
- Drainage basin A
- Limpopo River
