= Metsimotlhabe River =

River in Botswana

Location
- Country: Botswana

Physical characteristics
- Mouth
  - location: Notwane River

Location of the mouth of the Metsimotlhabe River on the Notwane River 24.443633°S 26.081107°E

The Metsimotlhabe River is the largest river in the Kweneng District of Botswana, draining the area that lies to the south of Molepolole into the Notwane River, in turn a tributary of the Limpopo River. The name "Metsimotlhabe" means "water sand river".

The Bokaa Dam was built in 1990/1991 by damming the Metsimotlhabe River just south of Bokaa village. Surface drainage in the sandveld surrounding the Metsimotlhabe is limited to pans and dry valleys, which rarely carry surface water. Sand extraction from the riverbed has caused problems, since this lowers the water table and causes the surrounding vegetation to die. This is a significant economic activity in the District. In June 2012 a spokesperson for the Ministry of Minerals, Energy and Water Resources pointed out that demand was high due to the boom in housing caused by the growing affluence of the country.
