= Makaleng =

Human settlement in Botswana

Coordinates: 20°54′S 27°17′E

Makaleng is a village in the North-East district of Botswana, roughly 60 km from Francistown.

The three major ethnic groups in Makaleng are the Bakalang Bakwena and the Bakhurutshe. According to Botswana's 2011 census, Makaleng had a population of 1117, in 297 households. Statistics Botswana projected that Makaleng's population would have grown to 1488 by 2020, with 43,9% of the population male and 56,1% female.

Makaleng has a sub police station and small clinic which also serves as a supplies centre for surrounding villages, including Sechele, Mambo, Masingwaneng, Botalaote,Toteng and Matenge. The village has a preschool, a primary school and a community junior school, which admits students from the aforementioned villages.

Makaleng inhabitants are mostly subsistence farmers.

The village has several tuck shops, a fresh produce store and a night club which cater for the whole of North East . There is also a kgotla, where all village meetings are conducted.
