= Tati Siding =

- Village
- Location within Botswana
- Coordinates: 21°16′53″S 27°28′21″E
- Country: Botswana
- District: North-East District

Population (2011)
  - Total: 8,112
- Time zone: GMT +2
- Climate: BSh

Tati Siding is a village located in the North-East District of Botswana. It had 8,112 inhabitants at the 2011 census.

== See also ==
- List of cities in Botswana
