= Mogobane =

Village in Botswana

- Village
- Interactive map of Mogobane
- Coordinates: 24°59′10″S 25°41′40″E
- Country: Botswana
- District: South-East

Population
  - Total: 2,926

Mogobane is a village in South-East District of Botswana. It is located 55 km south of Gaborone and 40 km east of Kanye. The village is located near the Mogobane Dam, and plans for a waterpark at the dam have been proposed.

Mogobane is home to the Balete people who are related to those in Ramotswa, Gabane and Otse. The population was 2,053 in the 2001 census, and rose to 2,926 for the 2022 census.

Like any other village that has a bit of a traditional Setswana essence, there are many dikgotla (familial neighborhoods) in Mogobane, the main one being where the customary court offices are located. The village chief has some elders from almost all village dikgotla as his advisors. There are two primary schools and one junior secondary school. The majority of the residents of Mogobane are Christians and so there are many churches in the village. Some interesting natural features in the village, which can be attractive to tourists include the dam, the hills (like Otse hill and Lentswe La Baratani) which make borders around the village, and the rock type found in most parts of the village.
