= Butale =

Village in Botswana

- Village
- Location within Botswana
- Coordinates: 20°43′S 27°42′E
- Country: Botswana
- District: North East

Population (2011)
  - Total: 549
- Time zone: UTC+2:00 (CAT)

Butale is a village in North East District of Botswana. It is located close to the border with Zimbabwe. The population was 549 in 2011 census. It has primary school and a health clinic. The villagers living in this area widely rely on growing crops and also keep domestic animals.
