= Botalaote =

- Village
- Location within Botswana
- Coordinates: 23.1034°S 26.8336°E
- Country: Botswana
- District: Central

Population (2011)
  - Total: 192
- Time zone: UTC+2 (Central Africa Time)
- Climate: BSh

Botalaote is a village in the Central District of Botswana. The population in 2001 was 182. The population in 2011 was 192.
