= Matshelagabedi =

- Location in Botswana
- Coordinates: 21°7′13″S 27°39′51″E
- Country: Botswana
- District: North-East
- Census district: North-East

Area
  - Total: 0.699 km^{2} (0.270 sq mi)

Population (2011)
  - Total: 3,488
  - Density: 4,990/km^{2} (12,900/sq mi)
- Time zone: UTC+2 (CAT)

Matshelagabedi is a town in eastern Botswana, 17 kilometers from Francistown with a population of 3,488 in 2011: 1,706 males and 1,782 females. The town is hometown to retired middle-distance runner Glody Dube.

In 2002, there was a foot-and-mouth disease outbreak in Matshelagabedi, along with three other villages. No more than 12,000 cattle died in the Matshelagabedi area. The government compensated farmers with cash and animals, and instituted a relief work program.

The Botswana Power Corporation has an emergency diesel plant of 70MW in Matshelagabedi.
