= Bokaa Dam =

- Location within Botswana
- Country: Botswana
- Location: Kgatleng District
- Coordinates: 24.438125°S 26.019926°E
- Purpose: Urban water supply
- Construction began: 1990
- Opening date: 1993

Dam and spillways
- Height: 14 metres (46 ft)

Reservoir
- Total capacity: 18,820,000 cubic metres (665,000,000 cu ft)
- Catchment area: 3,570 square kilometres (1,380 sq mi)
- Surface area: 660 hectares (1,600 acres)
- Maximum length: 6 kilometres (3.7 mi)
- Normal elevation: 1,000 metres (3,300 ft)

The Bokaa Dam is a dam on the Metsimotlhabe River, a tributary of the Ngotwane River, in Botswana. It provides water to the capital city of Gaborone. It is operated by the Water Utilities Corporation.

== Structure ==
The Bokaa Dam was built in 1990/1991 by damming the Metsimotlhabe River, a tributary of the Ngotwane river just south of Bokaa village. The catchment area is about 3,570 square kilometres (1,380 sq mi). The dam is an earthcore fill structure with a crest level height of 14 metres (46 ft). It was opened in 1993. The dam's surface area when full is 6.6 square kilometres (2.5 sq mi). The reservoir is about 6 kilometres (3.7 mi) in length and over 500 metres (1,600 ft) at its widest.

== Water supply ==
The Bokaa Dam has a capacity of 18,500,000 cubic metres (650,000,000 cu ft). It is about 20 kilometres (12 mi) from Botswana's capital of Gaborone. As of 2012 the dam provided 25% of the water supply for Gaborone and surrounding areas. There were exceptionally dry conditions in the winter of 2012, and the reservoir dried up and was closed in September 2012.

The North-South Carrier (NSC) pipeline came into service in 2000, delivering water to Gaborone from the north and running past the Bokaa Dam. An early version of the NSC plan used the Bokaa Dam as the reservoir, but it was decided to instead build a covered reservoir closer to Gaborone at Mmamashia to minimise loss of water through evaporation. Water from the Bokaa Dam is now injected into the NSC pipeline. Water is treated at the Mmamashia plant, directly to the south.

== Reservoir uses ==
There is a picnic spot for weekend visitors on the southern shore. The dam is in a region of Acacia savanna that is used for grazing many livestock including sheep, goats, donkeys and cattle. The fence is in disrepair so the livestock have trampled the water edge into bare mud in many areas.

The reservoir is home to many water birds, notably an important population of southern pochard. Significant numbers of great crested grebe have also been observed. Sometimes it is home to small numbers of pink-backed pelican. Between 1991 and 1995, counts of waterfowls peaked at about 4,000 individuals.
