= Tati River =

River in Botswana

Location
- Country: Botswana

Physical characteristics
- Source
  - coordinates: 20.506782°S 27.679869°E
- Mouth
  - location: Shashe River

Basin features
- Tributaries
  - left: Inchwe River

Location of the mouth of the Tati River on the Shasha River 21.553289°S 27.963889°E

The Tati River is a river in northeast Botswana, a tributary of the Shashe River, which in turn is a tributary of the Limpopo River. The river flows through Francistown, where it is joined by the Ntshe (or Inchwe) River from the left.

== History ==
About 1865 a hunter came across traces of old gold diggings near the Tati. He invited Karl Mauch to accompany him on his next trip, and in 1866 Mauch announced that he had found the Tati goldfields extending about 80 by 3 miles (128.7 by 4.8 km) which started the first gold rush in Southern Africa the following year. In 1869 the Englishman Daniel Francis came to hunt for gold on the river, before heading south to the Kimberley diamond fields in 1870. The gold was hard to extract, and the gold rush subsided. Francis returned in 1880 and obtained mining rights from King Lobengula. Mining activity revived in the 1880s and 1890s, and Francistown was established in 1897 when the railway arrived. The town was named after Francis, who owned most of the land in the area.

== Use ==
The sandy bed of the Tati river holds water only for a few days each year, as is common with rivers in Botswana. The river feeds the Ntimbale Dam, with a storage capacity of 26,370,000 cubic metres (931,000,000 cu ft). The dam, commissioned in 2008, supplies water to villages throughout the North East District. Further along its course, the river carries water to the Dikgatlhong Dam.

The water has become polluted from industrial and human waste, and there is a risk of cholera if the water is used untreated. During the extended dry season, the river loses its surface water, although water may be accessed in the sand bed. Mining of this sand has caused the water table to drop, and may also contribute to flooding.
