= Sechele, Botswana =

Village in Botswana

Sechele
- Village
- Location within Botswana
- Coordinates: 20.7586°S 27.3564°E

Population (2011)
  - Total: 528
- Time zone: UTC+2 (Central Africa Time)
  - Summer (DST): UTC+2 (not observed)
- Climate: BSh

Sechele is a village in the North-East District of Botswana. The population in 2001 was 668. The population in 2011 was 528.
