= Tswapong Hills =

Mountain range in Botswana

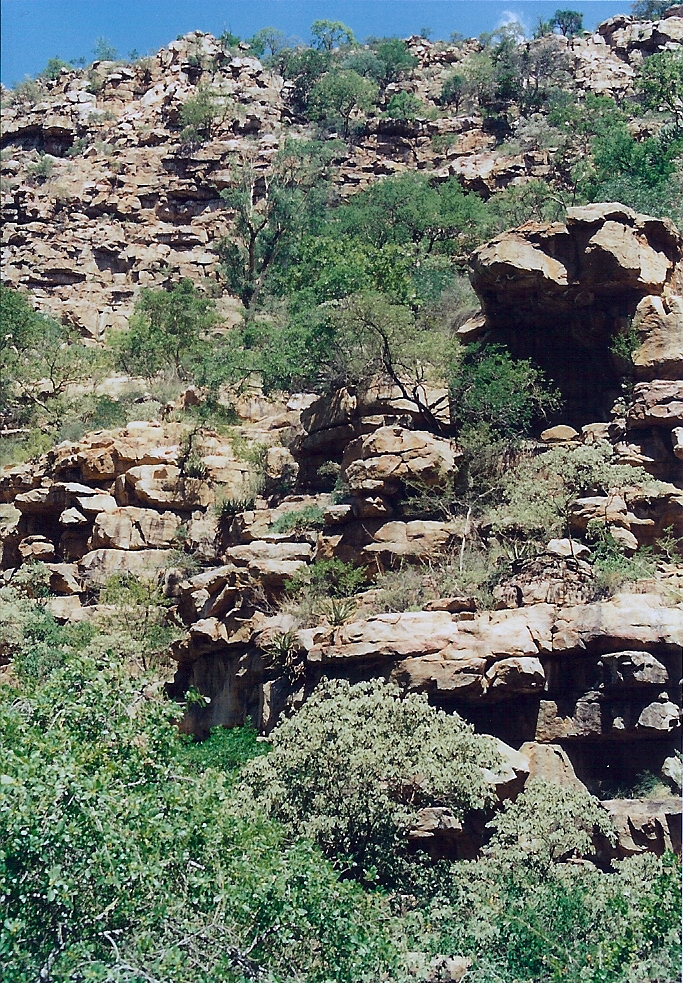
- The Moremi Gorge in the Tswapong range

Highest point
- Elevation: 1,390 m (4,560 ft)
- Listing: List of mountain ranges of South Africa
- Coordinates: 22°39′0″S 27°31′0″E

Dimensions
- Length: 63 km (39 mi) E/W
- Width: 13 km (8.1 mi) N/S

Geography
- Location within Botswana
- Location: Near Palapye
- Region(s): Central District, Botswana

Geology
- Orogeny: Waterberg Supergroup
- Rock age: Mesoproterozoic
- Rock type(s): Ironstone, quartzite, sandstone and conglomerate

The Tswapong Hills are a mountain range in the Central District, Botswana. They rise to an elevation of 300 to 400 m above the hardveld of the almost 900 m high surrounding plateau. Geologically, these flat-topped hills are similar to the Waterberg Massif, located about 100 km to the south.

The Tswapong Range receives relatively more moisture than the surrounding sandy plain of Mopane woodland. The rocky cliffs are made of porous rock that absorbs rainwater, which then seeps out forming permanent cascades and pools, such as the Phothophotho Gorge.

The Lotsane River flows at the feet of the Tswapong Hills on their northern side. One of the main attractions of the hills is the spectacular Moremi Gorge.

== Inhabited places ==
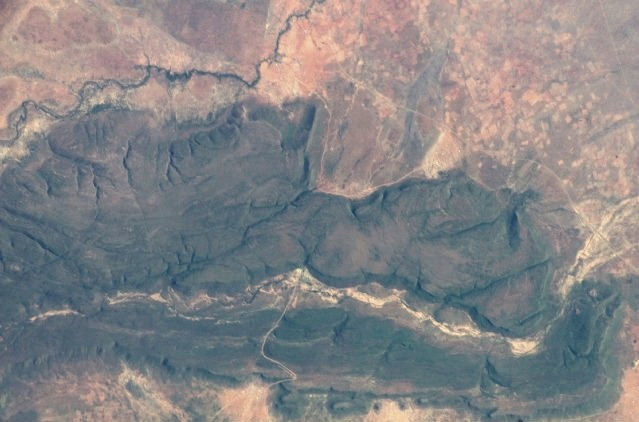
NASA picture of the Tswapong Hills with the Lotsane River flowing along the northern edge

The former capital of the Ngwato Kingdom was in Phalatswe, also called Old Palapye, at the western end of the Tswapong Range.

Moeng is a village located in the midst of the range at an altitude of 945 m. The village of Letsheng is located at the western end of the hills, while Matlakola and Maunatlala are on the northern side. At the base of the southern side there are the small villages of Tau, Gootau, Ratholo and Majwaneng. Lerala lies at the southeastern end of the range.

== Ecology ==
The Tswapong Range is not a protected area. The hills, however, provide one of the two breeding sites in Botswana for the cape vulture, a vulnerable species. Other birds found in the range are the black-collared barbet, the mocking chat and the red-winged starling.

This range is also one of the few areas where the Jameson's red rock hare can be found. Among the other wildlife found in the Tswapong Range, the leopard, brown hyena, kudu, rock hyrax, baboon and crested porcupine deserve mention. There are also two butterfly species endemic to the Tswapong Hills.

== See also ==
- Tswapong language
- Tuli Block
