= Bokaa =

- Location in Botswana
- Coordinates: 24°25′35″S 26°1′0″E
- Country: Botswana
- District: Kgatleng District

Government

Population (2011)
  - Total: 5,765

Bokaa is a village in Kgatleng District of Botswana. The village is located around 20 km south-west of Mochudi and the population was 5,765 in 2011 census. The village is just north of the Bokaa Dam.
