= Shashe River =

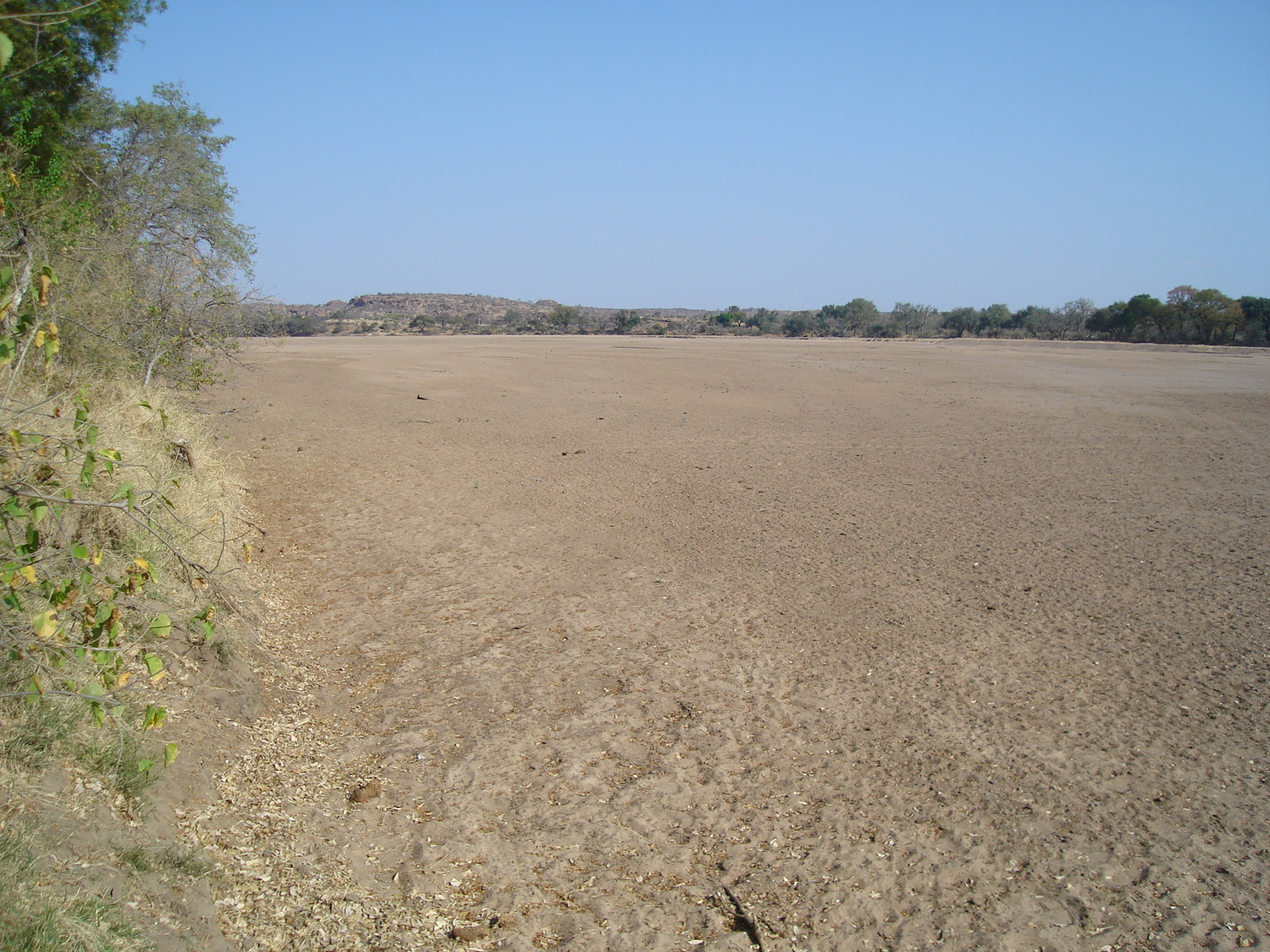
- Shashe River at Shashi Irrigation Scheme, Zimbabwe

Location
- Country: Botswana, Zimbabwe

Physical characteristics
- Source
  - location: northwest of Francistown, Botswana
- Mouth
  - location: Limpopo River
- Discharge
  - average: 462 million cubic metres per year (14.6 m^{3}/s; 517 cu ft/s)

Basin features
- Tributaries
  - left: Tati River, Ramokgwebana River, Thuli

Location of the mouth of the Shashe River on the Limpopo River 22.187961°S 29.354769°E

The Shashe River (or Shashi River) is a major left-bank tributary of the Limpopo River. It rises northwest of Francistown, Botswana and flows into the Limpopo River where Botswana, Zimbabwe and South Africa meet. The confluence is at the site of the Greater Mapungubwe Transfrontier Conservation Area.

== Hydrology ==
The Shashe is a highly ephemeral river, with flow generally restricted to a few days of the year. The river contributes 12.2% of the mean annual runoff of the Limpopo Basin.

Major tributaries of the Shashe River include the Simukwe, Shashani, Thuli, Tati and Ramokgwebana rivers. The lower Shashe is a sand filled channel, with extensive alluvial aquifers in the river channel and below the alluvial plains. These supply water for a number of irrigation schemes including Sibasa and Shashi.

More than two million years ago, the Upper Zambezi River used to flow south through what is now the Makgadikgadi Pan (presently a vast seasonal wetland) to the Shashe River and thence the Limpopo River.

== Settlements ==
There is a road bridge and a rail bridge south of Francistown. The lower Shashe River forms part of the border between Botswana and Zimbabwe and is unbridged in this section. However, at Tuli, both sides of the river are in Zimbabwe and there are two legal crossing points. The Shashi runs through the Shashi Irrigation Scheme and the Tuli Block.

== Dams ==
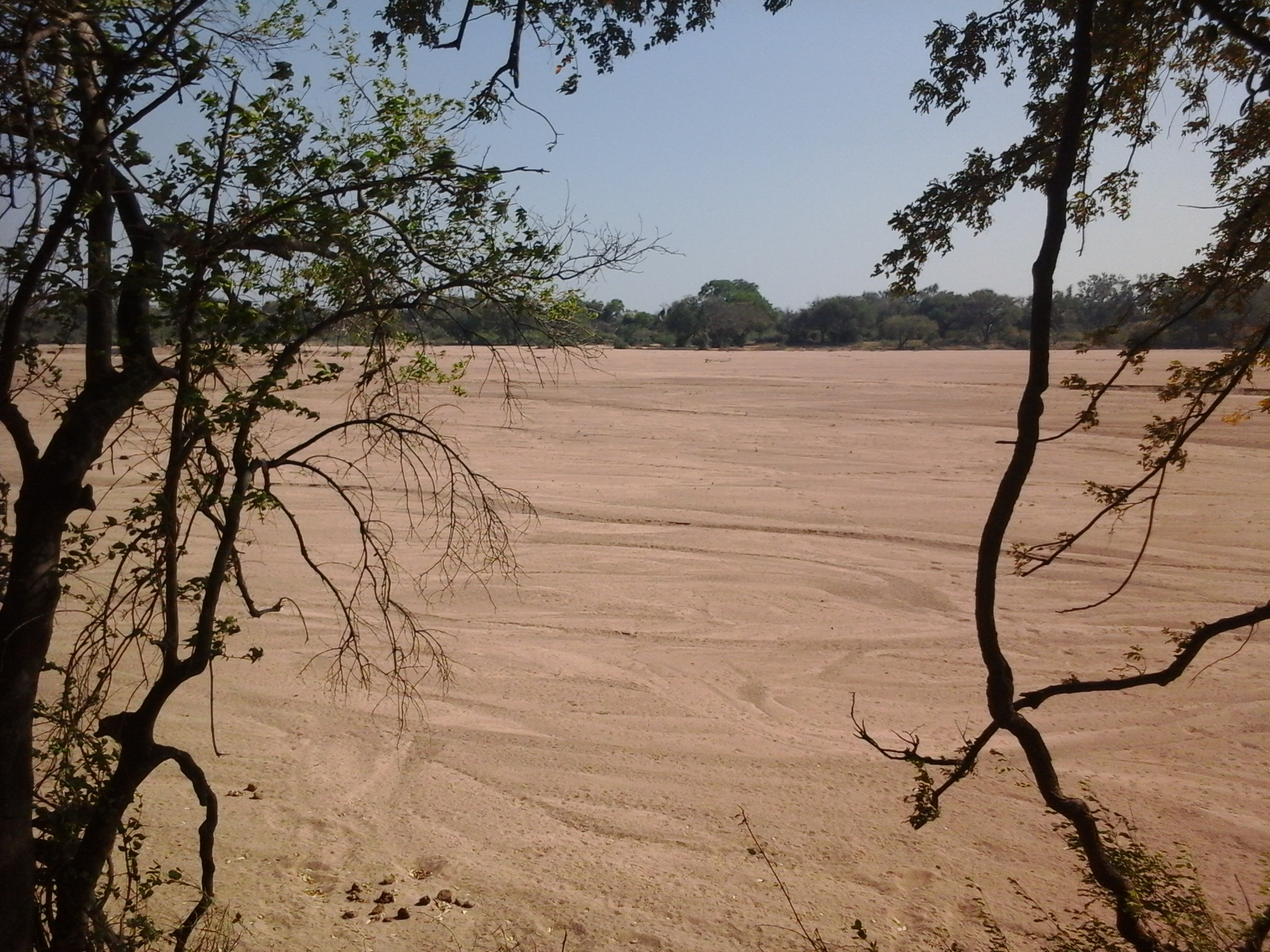
The Shashe River at the confluence with the Limpopo Rivers in Botswana

The Shashe River is dammed near Francistown at Shashe Dam. The original purpose was to supply water to the industrial city of Selebi-Phikwe. In 1982 it was found that groundwater from the local wells in Francistown had high levels of nitrate, and was also inadequate to meet public demand, so the public water supply for that city was changed over to using water from the Shashe Dam. The dam also supplies water to surrounding villages, Phoenix Mine (Tati Nickel Mining Company/Norilsk Nickel) and Mupane Gold Mine (IAMGOLD).

Further downstream, the Dikgatlhong Dam impounds the Shashe near the village of Robelela, completed in December 2011. When full it will hold 400,000,000 cubic metres (1.4×10^{10} cu ft). The next largest dam in Botswana, the Gaborone Dam, has capacity of 141,000,000 cubic metres (5.0×10^{9} cu ft). A pipeline from the Dikgatlhong Dam will connect to the North-South Carrier (NSC) pipeline at the BPT1 break pressure tank at Moralane. The NSC will take the water south to Gaborone.

== See also ==
- Geological changes to the course of the Zambezi River
- Mathangwane Village
- Thuli River
