= North-East District (Botswana) =

North-East
- District
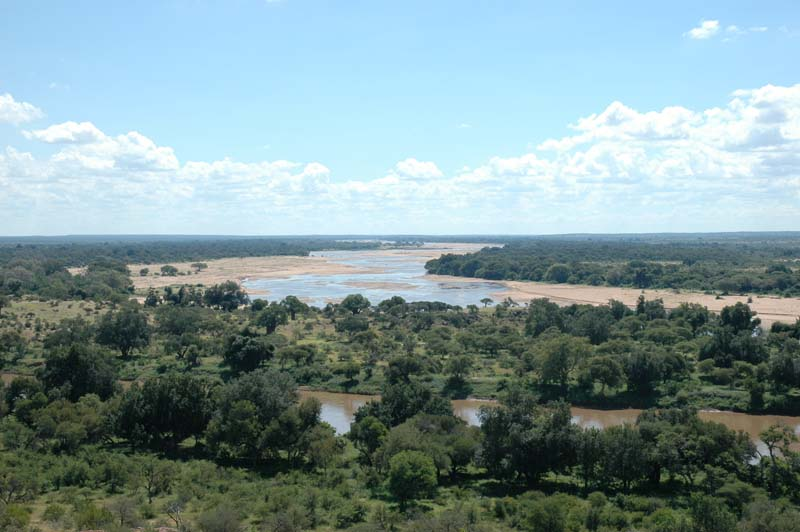
- Shashe River centre

- Location within Botswana
- Coordinates: 21°5′S 27°30′E
- Country: Botswana
- Capital: Francistown

Area
  - Total: 5,120 km^{2} (1,980 sq mi)

Population (2013 census)
  - Total: 167,500
  - Density: 32.7/km^{2} (84.7/sq mi)
- Time zone: UTC+2 (Central Africa Time)
- HDI (2017): 0.736 high · 2nd

The North-East District is one of the administrative districts of Botswana. Its capital is Francistown. In 2011, North-East had a population of 60,264 people. The district is predominantly occupied by Kalanga-speaking people, the BaKalanga. The district is administered by a district administration and district council, which are responsible for local administration.

In the north and east, the district borders the Matabeleland South Province of Zimbabwe, and the border in the east is predominantly along the Ramokgwebana River. In the south and west, the district borders the Central District along the Shashe River.

== Geography ==
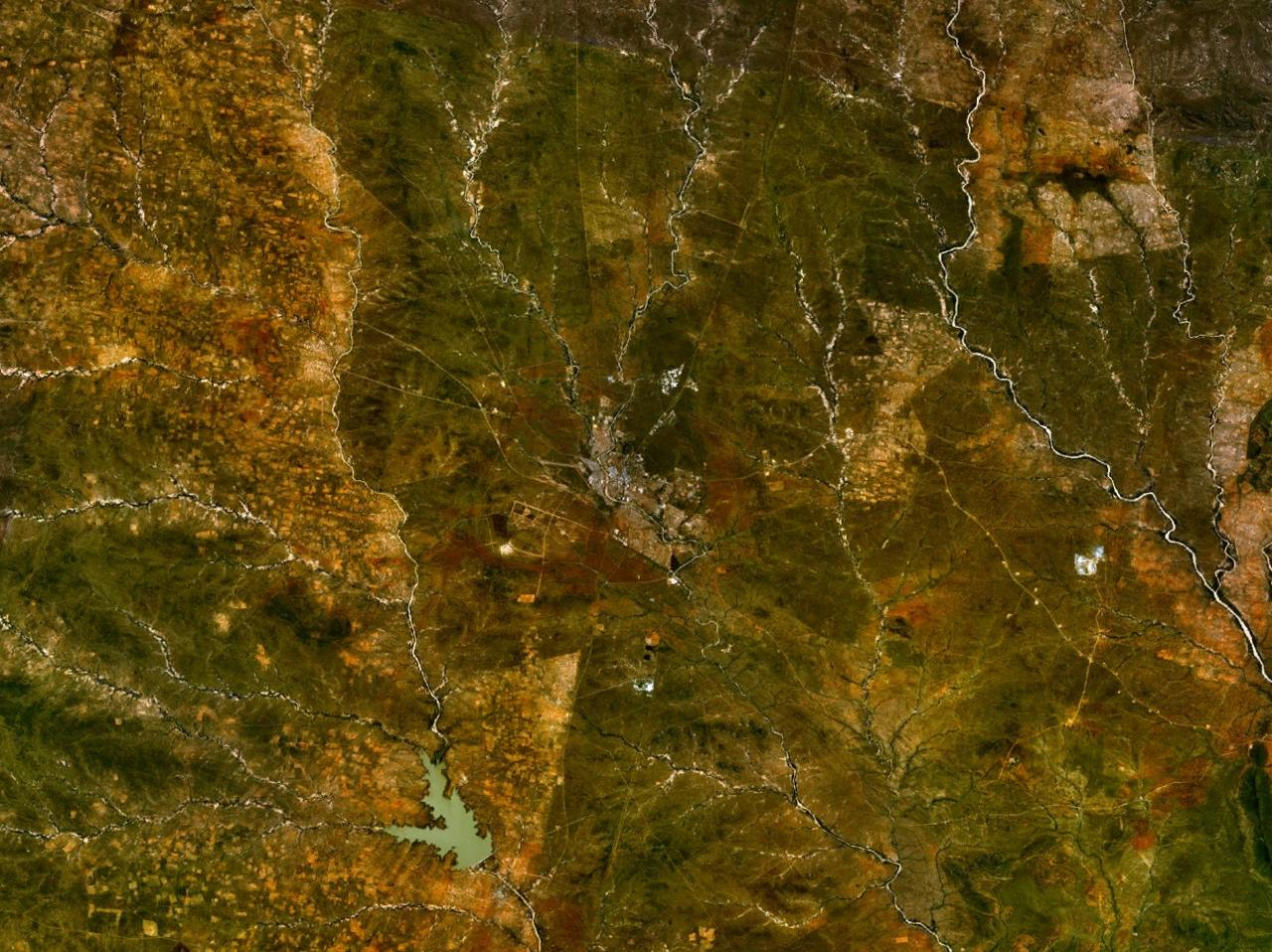
Aerial view of Francistown

Most parts of Botswana have tableland slopes sliding from east to west. It is predominantly savannah, with tall grasses, bushes, and trees. The region has an average elevation of around 915 m (3,002 ft) above sea level. The annual precipitation is around 65 cm (26 in), most of which is received during the summer season from November to May. There are conflicts between agricultural expansion and the protection of indigenous wildlife within the Central District.

The district has several seasonal rivers that flow in the rainy season and reach the Makgadikgadi Pan. Shashe River, which is prone to flash floods, is the most prominent. The Nata River, which is a significant gathering place for birds and other wildlife, flows through the district and discharges into the Makgadikgadi Pan.

== Demographics ==
Historical population
Year	Pop.	±%
1981	36,636	—
1991	43,354	+18.3%
2001	49,399	+13.9%
2011	60,264	+22.0%

According to the Census of Botswana, the district's total population was 60,264 in 2011, up from 49,399 in 2001 (an increase of 21.99%). The annual population growth rate during the decade was 2.01%. The population in the district was 2.98% of the total population in the country. The sex ratio was 90.30 females for every 100 males, compared to 88.29 in 2001. The average household size was 3.11 in 2011, compared to 4.55 in 2001. The total workforce was 10,243 workers, including 2426 craft and related workers; 593 clerks; 3485 elementary occupation workers; 273 legislators, administrators, and managers; 660 plant and machine operators and assemblers, 331 professionals; 1247 service, shop, and market sales workers; 444 skilled agricultural and related workers; and 730 technicians and associated professionals.

== Education and economy ==
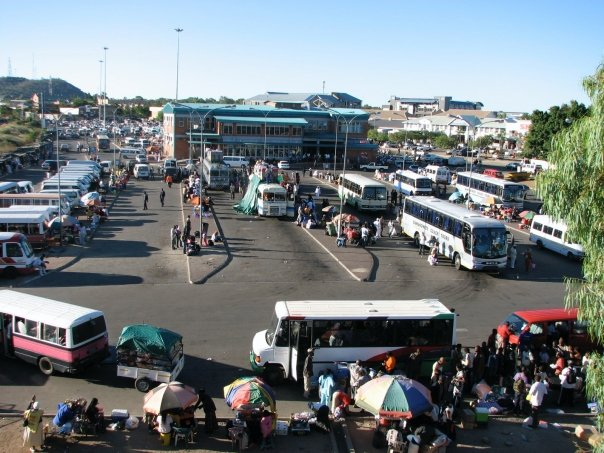
Francistown bus station

In 2011, there were a total of 66 schools in the district, with 6.70% private schools. There were 24,296 students in council schools and 1,277 in private schools. 25,572 total students were enrolled in the district: 12,564 girls and 13,008 boys. There were 1058 qualified teachers, 841 female and 217 male. There were around 53 temporary teachers, 34 female and 19 male. There were no untrained teachers in the district.

In 2006, 6881 workers were involved in agriculture, 1529 in construction, 1161 in education, 73 in electricity and water, 61 in finance, 288 in health, 187 in hotels and restaurants, 434 in manufacturing, 784 in mining and quarrying, 97 in other community services, 206 in private households, 1211 in public administration, 271 in real estate, 156 in transport and communications, and 1294 in wholesale and retail trade. There were 14,633 total workers, 7498 female and 7134 male.

== District administration ==
When Botswana gained independence from British colonization in 1966, the country adapted to the colonial administrative framework to form a district administration. Between 1970 and 1974, the policies were modified to address impediments to rural development.

The district is administered by a district administration and district council, which are responsible for local administration. The policies for the administration are framed by the Ministry of Local Government. The council's primary activities are Tribal Administration, Remote Area Development, and Local Governance. The executive powers of the council are vested on a commissioner appointed by the central government. The Department of Local Government Technical Services is responsible for developing and maintaining infrastructure, including roads, village water supplies, schools, and recreational facilities. All local administration staff members, except the District Administrator, are selected via Unified Local Government Services. The Ministry of Local Government is responsible for their training, deployment, and career development.

The North-East District has two sub-districts, the Francistown Subdistrict and the North-East Subdistrict. In the 2011 census, 43 villages were listed for the district: Botalaote, Butale, Ditladi, Gambule, Gulubane, Gungwe, Jackalas 1, Jackalas No 2, Kalakamati, Kgari, Letsholathebe, Mabudzane, Makaleng, Mambo, Mapoka, Masingwaneng, Masukwane, Masunga, Maitengwe, Matopi, Matshelagabedi, Matsiloje, Mbalambi, Moroka, Mosojane, Mowana, Mulambakwena, Nlakhwane, Patayamatebele, Pole, Ramokgwebana, Sechele, Sekakangwe, Senyawe, Shashe Bridge, Siviya, Tati Siding, Themashanga, Toteng, Tsamaya, Tshesebe, Vukwi, and Zwenshambe.

== See also ==
- Sub-districts of Botswana
- Mathangwane Village
