= Letsibogo Dam =

- Location within Botswana
- Country: Botswana
- Location: Urban water supply
- Coordinates: 21.844819°S 27.734608°E
- Opening date: 2000

Dam and spillways
- Height: 28 metres (92 ft)

Reservoir
- Total capacity: 100,000,000 cubic metres (3.5×10^{9} cu ft)
- Surface area: 18 square kilometres (6.9 sq mi)

The Letsibogo Dam is a dam on the Motloutse River in Botswana, built to initially provide water to the industrial town of Selebi-Phikwe and surrounding areas, with the potential for use in irrigation. The dam now supplies Gaborone, the capital of the country, via a 400 kilometres (250 mi) pipeline, as well as major villages along the pipeline route.

== Location and climate ==
The dam is located near the village of Mmadinare. The climate is tropical and semi-arid, with 90% of rainfall during the period from November to March. Mean annual precipitation is about 450 millimetres (18 in) in the catchment area above the dam. It is very variable, with rainfall less than 40% of the average expected in one year in seven. In August 2012 the dam was only one-third full, prompting concerns that there could soon be water shortages in the areas of Palapye, Mahalapye and Gaborone. Some blamed the problem in part to slow repair of leaking pipelines.

== Structure and operations ==
The dam was designed for the Ministry of Minerals, Energy and Water Resources by Arup, who also supervised construction of the water storage embankment and central clay-core dam. It has storage capacity of 100,000,000 cubic metres (3.5×10^{9} cu ft). It is operated by the Water Utilities Corporation. The dam is part of the North-South Carrier Water Project, which includes other dams, water transmission systems and water treatment works, bringing water from the northeast of Botswana to the southeast. It is linked to Gaborone by a 400 kilometres (250 mi) pipeline. The initial North South Carrier Scheme cost about US$350 million, and came into operation in 2000.

== Reservoir uses ==
Although primarily designed for water storage, the dam is being promoted for tourists as a place for water sports and fishing. In 2011 the government announced plans to upgrade the infrastructure round the dam, include roads, sewage and drinking water, and to create the first artificial beach in Botswana on the northern part of Letsibogo dam. The local government was planning to build a 5-star eco-lodge and a game reserve.
