= Mmadinare =

- Village
- Location within Botswana
- Coordinates: 21.8746°S 27.7496°E
- Country: Botswana
- District: Central District

Population (Census 2011)
  - Total: 12,086
- Time zone: UTC+2 (Central Africa Time)
  - Summer (DST): UTC+2 (not observed)

Mmadinare is a village in the Central District of Botswana, 15 kilometers from Selibe Phikwe. The village is slowly growing into a town, with a population estimate of about 13,000 (2004 census) people of different tribes including Bangwato, Batalaote, Babirwa, and others. Mmadinare is located in the center of hills; like other villages in Southern Africa it was started during wars and hills were used as a form of protection from enemies, as the villagers were able to see threats from a distance.

== Geography ==
Motloutse River, which flows on the northern side of the village, supplies the Letsibogo Dam with water, on its way to Shashe River down further east. The river is partly depleted as a result of sand mining by the copper mine in Selibe Phikwe, which gets sand from the river to wash their copper ores.

The area has a high potential for tourism and wildlife resources, as there are many animals in the surrounding areas especially elephants which destroy people's crops and properties. Sometimes lives are lost in the process.

== History ==
The village was founded around 1900 by the Batalaote when they gave up the settlement of Palapye. The Batalaote settled and lived near the Makome hill and occupied the Kelele and Seboo wards. Those from South Africa settled and stayed near Maretemagolo hill and formed Manga and Matabi wards. The royal families of Kelele and Seboo were banished from Mmadinare in 1908 by the colonial administration. They latter settled in Senyawe according to village elders and historians.

== Culture and sports ==
The people of Mmadinare prefer a very quiet life and low profile lifestyle and like their customs and traditions like eating traditional food (mabele) while at the same time trying to develop into a small town without losing its past as it gets a major influence from the neighbor town of Selibe Phikwe.

There is an annual 10 km race that takes place in the village held on Christmas Day and is one of the main attraction of visitors to the village especially in December. Mmadinare usually organise seasonal football tournaments sponsored by different organisations.

== Infrastructure ==
The village contains a police station, a senior secondary school and the Letsibogo Dam. The village has two junior secondary schools (Makome and Merementsi). Mmadinare has six primary schools which are St Peters, Mmadinare School, Phethu-mphoeng, Tapalakoma, Kelele and Letsibogo, and a few preschools. Mmadinare Primary Hospital is a government-run district hospital located in Mmadinare.
