= Motloutse River =

River in Botswana

Location
- Country: Botswana

Physical characteristics
- Mouth
  - coordinates: 22.225488°S 29.017614°E
- Basin size: 19,053 km^{2} (7,356 sq mi)

Location in Botswana

The Motloutse River is a river in Botswana, a tributary of the Limpopo River. The catchment area is 19,053 square kilometres (7,356 sq mi).

The Letsibogo Dam on the Motloutse has been built to serve the industrial town of Selebi-Phikwe and surrounding local areas, with potential for use in irrigation.

== Ecology ==
A field survey of the region in January 1989, before the dam was built, recorded 120 species of birds, mostly small insectivores. A relatively large number of water birds were found due to the presence of permanent pools on the Motloutse river downstream from its confluence with the Letlhakane river. The species of bird were generally typical for the region. Before the dam was built, five or more pioneer fish species would migrate upstream from the Limpopo River into the Motloutse River during floods. The Letsibogo dam was expected to support a permanent fish population similar to that of the Shashe Dam.

== Water resource ==
Mean annual precipitation is 430 millimetres (17 in), while mean annual potential evapotranspiration is 2,000 millimetres (79 in). Due to this difference, the river is an ephemeral sand river with surface flow only during the rainy season. Rainfall is also highly variable, with below 40% of the average annual rains expected one year in seven. Mean annual runoff is 111,000,000 cubic metres (3.9×10^{9} cu ft).

== Mineral resources ==
Gold mining along the Motloutse and Limpopo rivers started around 1200 CE, about the time that Great Zimbabwe rose to become a regional power. was found in 1860 in the old workings near Francistown, to the north of the river, causing the first small gold rush in Africa. The first authenticated diamonds to be found in Botswana were three small stones discovered in 1959 by the Central African Selection Trust in gravels in the Motloutse River near Foley Siding. The team that found the diamonds examined the river up to its headwaters, but found no likely source.
