= Robelela =

- Location of Robelela
- Coordinates: 21.5902°S 27.9850°E
- Country: Botswana
- District: Central District

Population (2001)
  - Total: 471

Robelela is a village in Central District of Botswana. It is located south-east of Francistown, close to the border with Zimbabwe. The population was 471 in 2001 census.

Robelela in the Bobirwa Sub-District, is the village closest to the Dikgatlhong Dam, completed in 2012. This will be the biggest dam in Botswana with a carrying capacity of 400 million cubic meters. A pipeline to Selebi-Phikwe is planned to carry the water to the North-South Carrier Pipeline, which will take the water south from Selebi-Phikwe to Gaborone.

The influx of construction workers for the three major components of the project, which includes a new tarred road, and the relocation of affected settlements has started to increase the population of Robelela, and there is concern that these previously isolated communities are a high risk for HIV/AIDS and STD infections. Recognizing the risk of mobile communities for HIV and STD transmission, the Department of Water Affairs has contracted Tebelopele (the largest NGO in Botswana, responsible for HIV/AIDS Counseling and Testing) to implement a program of intervention, education and testing in the region. Tebelopele has appointed Golekanye Monare as Project manager for the Dikgatong Dam.
