= Nata-Gweta =

Parliamentary constituency in the Central District, 2004 onwards

- Single-member constituency for the National Assembly
- District: Central
- Population: 33,598
- Major settlements: Nata
- Area: 28,936 km^{2}

Current constituency
- Created: 2004
- Party: BPF
- Created from: Sebina-Gweta
- MP: Lawrence Ookeditse
- Margin of victory: 3,916 (33.2 pp)

Nata-Gweta is a constituency in the Central District represented in the National Assembly of Botswana by Lawrence Ookeditse of the Botswana Patriotic Front since 2024.

== Constituency profile ==
The constituency was created in 2004 after moderate boundary changes following the 2002 delimitation exercise which saw Sebina-Gweta rename to Nata-Gweta. The seat, like its predecessor was a BDP stronghold and had voted for the BDP from 2004 until 2024 where it returned a non-BDP MP for the first time.

The rural constituency encompasses the following locations:

1. Nata
2. Gweta
3. Sowa Town
4. Dukwi
5. Sepako
6. Maposa
7. Mosetse
8. Zoroga
9. Mmanxotae
10. Tshokatshaa
11. Lepashe
12. Kutamogoree

== Members of Parliament ==
Key: BDP BPF

Election	Winner
2004 election	Olifant Mfa
2009 election	Rayner Makosha
2014 election	Polson Majaga
2019 election	Polson Majaga
2024 election	Lawrence Ookeditse

== Election results ==
=== 2024 election ===
General election 2024: Nata-Gweta
Party	Candidate	Votes	%	±%
BPF	Lawrence Ookeditse	6,205	52.54	+18.58
BDP	Polson Majaga	2,289	19.38	−31.29
BCP	Wamba Chingapani	1,934	16.37	N/A
UDC	Seitiso Mompati	844	7.15	−8.22
BRP	Thatayaone Kehitile	539	4.56	N/A
Margin of victory		3,916	33.18	N/A
Total valid votes		11,811	99.00	−0.10
Rejected ballots		119	1.00	+0.10
Turnout		11,930	81.24	+1.71
Registered electors		14,685		
BPF gain from BDP		Swing	+24.94	

=== 2019 election ===
General election 2019: Nata-Gweta
Party	Candidate	Votes	%	±%
BDP	Polson Majaga	4,754	50.67	+13.89
BPF	Joe Linga	3,186	33.96	N/A
UDC	Tirelo Ketlhoilwe	1,442	15.37	N/A
Margin of victory		1,568	16.71	+11.66
Total valid votes		9,382	99.10	+3.33
Rejected ballots		85	0.90	−3.33
Turnout		9,467	79.53	−8.97
Registered electors		11,903		
BDP hold		Swing	+23.93	

=== 2014 election ===
General election 2014: Nata-Gweta
Party	Candidate	Votes	%	±%
BDP	Polson Majaga	3,424	36.78	−26.72
BCP	Ditiro Majadibodu	2,954	31.73	−4.77
Independent	Joe Linga	2,931	31.49	N/A
Margin of victory		470	5.05	−21.95
Total valid votes		9,309	95.77	−1.21
Rejected ballots		411	4.23	+1.21
Turnout		9,720	88.50	+18.54
Registered electors		10,983		
BDP hold		Swing	−10.98	

=== 2009 election ===
General election 2009: Nata-Gweta
Party	Candidate	Votes	%	±%
BDP	Rayner Makosha	4,118	63.50	−1.02
BCP	Ditiro Majadibodu	2,367	36.50	+1.02
Margin of victory		1,751	27.00	−18.63
Total valid votes		6,485	96.98	−0.54
Rejected ballots		202	3.02	+0.54
Turnout		6,687	69.96	−1.09
Registered electors		9,558		
BDP hold		Swing	−1.02	

=== 2004 election ===
General election 2004: Nata-Gweta
Party	Candidate	Votes	%
BDP	Olifant Mfa	2,988	64.52
BAM	Tosa Budulala	875	18.89
BCP	Alphons Seisa	768	16.58
Margin of victory		2,113	45.63
Total valid votes		4,631	97.52
Rejected ballots		118	2.48
Turnout		4,749	71.05
Registered electors		6,684	
BDP notional hold			
