= Shashe West =

Parliamentary constituency in the Central District, 2004 onwards

- Single-member constituency for the National Assembly
- District: Central
- Population: 38,484
- Area: 4,135 km^{2}

Current constituency
- Created: 2004
- Party: BPF
- Created from: Sebina-Gweta; Tonota
- MP: Jeremiah Frenzel
- Margin of victory: 3,517 (30.0 pp)

Shashe West is a constituency in the Central District represented in the National Assembly of Botswana by Jeremiah Frenzel of the Botswana Patriotic Front (BPF) since 2024.

== Constituency profile ==
The constituency was originally established as Tonota North in 2004 following the division of the Sebina-Gweta and Tonota constituencies. It was represented by Finance Minister Baledzi Gaolathe of the Botswana Democratic Party (BDP) from its creation until his passing in 2010. Gaolathe was the father of the current vice-president of Botswana, Ndaba Gaolathe.

Following Gaolathe's death, the BDP retained the seat at the 2010 by-election, with Fidelis Molao serving as its MP. Ahead of the 2014 general election, the constituency was renamed Shashe West following minor boundary adjustments. Molao continued to hold the seat until his defeat at the 2024 general election, where Jeremiah Frenzel of the Botswana Patriotic Front (BPF) secured an unexpected victory. Frenzel's vote share surged by 50 percentage points from just three percent in the previous election. Shashe West recorded the third-largest swing nationwide, trailing only Lobatse and Chobe.

The rural constituency encompasses the following locations:

1. Borolong
2. Makobo
3. Natale
4. Chadibe
5. Jamataka
6. Mathangwane
7. Matsitama
8. Mabesekwa
9. Shashe-Mooke

== Members of Parliament ==
Key: BDP BPF

Election	Winner
2004 election	Baledzi Gaolathe
2009 election	Baledzi Gaolathe
2010 by-election	Fidelis Molao
2014 election	Fidelis Molao
2019 election	Fidelis Molao
2024 election	Jeremiah Frenzel

== Election results ==
=== 2024 election ===
General election 2024: Shashe West
Party	Candidate	Votes	%	±%
BPF	Jeremiah Frenzel	6,506	53.47	+50.07
BDP	Fidelis Molao	2,989	23.50	−27.13
BCP	Oganne Mazwigwila	1,649	12.96	N/A
UDC	Alfred Mashungwa	1,281	10.07	−31.61
Margin of victory		3,517	29.97	N/A
Total valid votes		12,425	98.60	−0.65
Rejected ballots		177	1.40	+0.65
Turnout		12,602	81.75	−1.95
Registered electors		15,415		
BPF gain from BDP		Swing	+38.60	

=== 2019 election ===
General election 2019: Shashe West
Party	Candidate	Votes	%	±%
BDP	Fidelis Molao	7,181	50.63	−6.65
UDC	Alfred Mashungwa	5,911	41.68	+14.32
AP	Gaorewe Keagile	608	4.29	N/A
BPF	Blackie Ndwapi	483	3.40	N/A
Margin of victory		1,270	8.95	−22.89
Total valid votes		14,183	99.25	+0.24
Rejected ballots		107	0.75	−0.24
Turnout		14,290	83.70	+0.20
Registered electors		17,074		
BDP gain from		Swing	−10.49	

=== 2014 election ===
General election 2014: Shashe West
Party	Candidate	Votes	%	±%
BDP	Fidelis Molao	6,839	57.28	−8.17
BCP	Motlhaleemang Moalosi	3,037	25.44	−9.11
Independent	Onkabetse Daniel	1,835	15.37	N/A
UDC	Gabatshele Bathuseng	229	1.92	N/A
Margin of victory		3,802	31.84	+0.94
Total valid votes		11,940	99.01	+0.88
Rejected ballots		119	0.99	−0.88
Turnout		12,059	83.50	+12.15
Registered electors		14,442		
BDP hold		Swing	+0.47	

=== 2010 by-election ===
By-election 2010: Tonota North
Party	Candidate	Votes	%	±%
BDP	Fidelis Molao	4,575	63.07	−2.38
BCP	Habaudi Hobona	2,617	36.08	+1.53
MELS	Mbayani Phalalo	62	0.85	N/A
Margin of victory		1,958	26.99	−3.91
Total valid votes		7,254	98.11	−0.02
Rejected ballots		140	1.89	+0.02
Turnout		7,394	58.31	−13.04
Registered electors		12,680		
BDP hold		Swing	−1.96	

=== 2009 election ===
General election 2009: Tonota North
Party	Candidate	Votes	%	±%
BDP	Baledzi Gaolathe	5,811	65.45	−2.57
BCP	Habaudi Hobona	3,067	34.55	+13.21
Margin of victory		2,744	30.90	−15.78
Total valid votes		8,878	98.13	+1.94
Rejected ballots		169	1.87	−1.94
Turnout		9,047	71.35	−2.15
Registered electors		12,680		
BDP hold		Swing	−7.89	

=== 2004 election ===
General election 2004: Tonota North
Party	Candidate	Votes	%
BDP	Baledzi Gaolathe	4,444	68.02
BCP	Habaudi Hobona	1,394	21.34
BPP	Boitshwarelo Chepete	695	10.64
Margin of victory		3,050	46.68
Total valid votes		6,533	96.19
Rejected ballots		259	3.81
Turnout		6,792	73.50
Registered electors		9,241	
BDP notional hold			
