= Palapye (Botswana constituency) =

Parliamentary constituency in the Central District, 1994 onwards

- Single-member constituency for the National Assembly
- District: Central
- Population: 61,875
- Major settlements: Palapye
- Area: 2,801 km^{2}

Current constituency
- Created: 1994
- Party: UDC
- Created from: Serowe South; Tswapong North
- MP: Onneetse Ramogapi
- Margin of victory: 4,022 (18.7 pp)

Palapye is a constituency in the Central District represented in the National Assembly of Botswana by Onneetse Ramogapi, an Umbrella for Democratic Change (UDC) MP and Minister of Water and Human Settlement since 2019.

== Constituency profile ==
The constituency was originally created in 1994, as part of an increase in constituencies following the 1992 periodic delimitation exercise. The Botswana Democratic Party (BDP) has held the seat since its inaugural election in 1994 and lost it 25 years later at the 2019 general election amongst a regional swing against the BDP in the Central District. The UDC held the seat with a larger majority at the 2024 general election, amidst large nationwide swings against the BDP, which saw it lose power for the first time. It was represented by then vice-president of Botswana, Festus Mogae until 1998, when he ascended to the presidency.

The semi-rural constituency, anchored around Palapye encompasses the following settlements:

1. Palapye
2. Topisi
3. Mokgware
4. Mogome
5. Radisele
6. Moreomabele

== Members of Parliament ==
Key: BDP UDC

Election	Winner
1994 election	Festus Mogae
1998 by-election	Boyce Sebetela
1999 election	Boyce Sebetela
2004 election	Boyce Sebetela
2009 election	Moiseraele Goya
2014 election	Moiseraele Goya
2019 election	Onneetse Ramogapi
2024 election	Onneetse Ramogapi

== Election results ==
=== 2024 election ===
General election 2024: Palapye
Party	Candidate	Votes	%	±%
UDC	Onneetse Ramogapi	9,516	44.34	+4.48
BCP	Gape Motswaledi	5,494	25.60	N/A
BDP	Kungo Mabogo	3,179	14.81	−22.70
BPF	Golosang Ramogala	1,802	8.40	−4.50
BRP	Moiseraele Goya	991	4.62	N/A
BMD	Timothy Monyatsi	252	1.17	N/A
Independent	Lucky Maforaga	208	0.97	N/A
Independent	Guy Molentze	20	0.09	N/A
Margin of victory		4,022	18.74	+16.39
Total valid votes		21,462	99.40	+0.12
Rejected ballots		129	0.60	−0.12
Turnout		21,591	80.72	−2.25
Registered electors		26,747		
UDC hold		Swing	N/A	

=== 2019 election ===
General election 2019: Palapye
Party	Candidate	Votes	%	±%
UDC	Onneetse Ramogapi	5,582	39.86	−2.64
BDP	Moiseraele Goya	5,252	37.51	−18.83
BPF	Kolaatamo Malefho	1,806	12.90	N/A
AP	Gape Motswaledi	1,306	9.33	N/A
Independent	Boniface Mankanku	57	0.41	N/A
Margin of victory		330	2.35	N/A
Total valid votes		14,003	99.28	+0.07
Rejected ballots		101	0.72	−0.07
Turnout		14,104	82.97	+2.84
Registered electors		16,999		
UDC gain from BDP		Swing	+8.10	

=== 2014 election ===
General election 2014: Palapye
Party	Candidate	Votes	%	±%
BDP	Moiseraele Goya	6,771	56.34	+0.74
BCP	James Olesitse	4,732	39.37	−1.36
UDC	Boniface Mankanku	376	3.13	N/A
Independent	Mortimer Nwako	139	1.16	N/A
Margin of victory		2,039	16.97	+2.10
Total valid votes		12,018	99.21	−0.51
Rejected ballots		96	0.79	+0.51
Turnout		12,114	80.13	+7.10
Registered electors		15,118		
BDP hold		Swing	+1.05	

=== 2009 election ===
General election 2009: Palapye
Party	Candidate	Votes	%	±%
BDP	Moiseraele Goya	5,161	55.60	−0.47
BCP	James Olesitse	3,781	40.73	+7.30
BNF	Conrad Mothobi	341	3.67	−6.84
Margin of victory		1,380	14.87	−7.77
Total valid votes		9,283	99.72	+1.57
Rejected ballots		26	0.28	−1.57
Turnout		9,309	73.03	−0.78
Registered electors		12,746		
BDP hold		Swing	−3.89	

=== 2004 election ===
General election 2004: Palapye
Party	Candidate	Votes	%	±%
BDP	Boyce Sebetela	3,863	56.07	−10.08
BCP	James Olesitse	2,303	33.43	+11.97
BNF	Lebitsa Lere	724	10.51	+0.31
Margin of victory		1,560	22.64	−22.05
Total valid votes		6,890	98.15	+0.82
Rejected ballots		130	1.85	−0.82
Turnout		7,020	73.81	−2.22
Registered electors		9,511		
BDP hold		Swing	−11.03	

=== 1999 election ===
General election 1999: Palapye
Party	Candidate	Votes	%	±%
BDP	Boyce Sebetela	5,164	66.15	−1.49
BCP	James Olesitse	1,675	21.46	N/A
BNF	S. Malatsi	796	10.20	−15.95
BAM	C. Molosiwa	171	2.19	N/A
Margin of victory		3,489	44.69	+3.20
Total valid votes		7,806	97.33	N/A
Rejected ballots		214	2.67	N/A
Turnout		8,020	76.03	+1.74
Registered electors		10,549		
BDP hold		Swing	N/A	

=== 1994 election ===
General election 1994: Palapye
Party	Candidate	Votes	%
BDP	Festus Mogae	3,944	67.64
BNF	K.K. Motshidisi	1,525	26.15
UDF	James Olesitse	261	4.48
BIP	Sebofeng Boima	101	1.73
Margin of victory		2,419	41.49
Turnout		5,831	74.29
Registered electors		7,849	
BDP win (new seat)			
