= Mahalapye East =

Parliamentary constituency in the Central District, 2004 onwards

- Single-member constituency for the National Assembly
- District: Central
- Population: 30,047
- Major settlements: Mahalapye
- Area: 5,031 km^{2}

Current constituency
- Created: 2004
- Party: UDC
- Created from: Mahalapye
- MP: Augustine Nyatanga
- Margin of victory: 4,140 (30.8 pp)

Mahalapye East is a constituency in the Central District represented in the National Assembly of Botswana by Augustine Nyatanga of the Umbrella for Democratic Change (UDC) since 2024.

== Constituency profile ==
The constituency was created in 2004 as part of an increase in the number of Mahalapye constituencies from one to two. The Botswana Democratic Party (BDP) won the seat in its inaugural election in 2004 and held on to it for the next two elections. The 2014 saw the BDP dip below 50% for the first time. In 2019, echoing a broader trend within the district, a significant political realignment occurred as Ian Khama, paramount chief of the Ngwato tribe fell out with the incumbent president, Mokgweetsi Masisi and leader of the BDP. This political discord impacted the constituency's voting patterns. The Umbrella for Democratic Change flipped the seat, largely benefitting from the BPF siphoning away votes from the BDP. The seat was held by the UDC at a larger majority in 2024.

The rural constituency encompasses the following locations:

1. Eastern Mahalapye
2. Taupye
3. Makwate
4. Shakwe
5. Dovedale
6. Mokoswane
7. Kudumatswe
8. Mmaphashalala
9. Mookane
10. Palla Road
11. Parr's Halt Border Post

== Members of Parliament ==
Key: BDP UDC

Election	Winner
2004 election	Botlogile Tshireletso
2009 election	Botlogile Tshireletso
2014 election	Botlogile Tshireletso
2019 election	Yandani Boko
2024 election	Augustine Nyatanga

== Election results ==
=== 2024 election ===
General election 2024: Mahalapye East
Party	Candidate	Votes	%	±%
UDC	Augustine Nyatanga	7,140	53.03	+10.87
BDP	Thebe Setlalekgosi	3,000	22.28	−14.64
BCP	Ethel Gaampone	2,100	15.60	N/A
BPF	Lazarus Lekgoanyane	1,224	9.09	−11.83
Margin of victory		4,140	30.75	+25.51
Total valid votes		13,464	99.00	+0.32
Rejected ballots		135	1.00	−0.32
Turnout		13,599	82.04	−2.67
Registered electors		16,577		
UDC hold		Swing	+12.76	

=== 2019 election ===
General election 2019: Mahalapye East
Party	Candidate	Votes	%	±%
UDC	Yandani Boko	4,323	42.16	+2.24
BDP	Ecco Maje	3,786	36.92	−11.58
BPF	Lazarus Lekgoanyana	2,145	20.92	N/A
Margin of victory		537	5.24	N/A
Total valid votes		10,254	98.68	+1.16
Rejected ballots		137	1.32	−1.16
Turnout		10,391	84.71	+0.38
Registered electors		12,267		
UDC gain from BDP		Swing	+6.91	

Note: UDC vote share is compared to the total vote share of the UDC and BCP in 2014.

=== 2014 election ===
General election 2014: Mahalapye East
Party	Candidate	Votes	%	±%
BDP	Botlogile Tshireletso	4,406	48.50	−18.51
UDC	Harry Mothei	2,479	27.29	−4.13
BCP	Enerst Nthobelang	1,147	12.63	−28.11
Independent	Neo Magowe	1,053	11.59	N/A
Margin of victory		1,927	21.21	−14.38
Total valid votes		9,085	97.52	−0.48
Rejected ballots		231	2.48	+0.48
Turnout		9,316	84.33	+9.24
Registered electors		11,047		
BDP hold		Swing	−7.19	

Note: UDC vote share is compared to the vote share of the BNF in 2009.

=== 2009 election ===
General election 2009: Mahalapye East
Party	Candidate	Votes	%	±%
BDP	Botlogile Tshireletso	5,178	67.01	+3.58
BNF	Basimane Mannaesi	2,428	31.42	−0.15
Independent	Roosevelt Kgosi	121	1.57	N/A
Margin of victory		2,750	35.59	+3.73
Total valid votes		7,727	98.00	+0.22
Rejected ballots		157	2.00	−0.22
Turnout		7,884	75.09	−1.18
Registered electors		10,499		
BDP hold		Swing	+1.87	

=== 2004 election ===
General election 2004: Mahalapye East
Party	Candidate	Votes	%
BDP	Botlogile Tshireletso	3,979	63.43
BNF	Wame Boitumelo	1,836	31.57
Margin of victory		2,143	31.86
Total valid votes		5,815	97.78
Rejected ballots		132	2.22
Turnout		5,947	76.27
Registered electors		7,797	
BDP win (new seat)			
