= Nata Bird Sanctuary =

Protected area in Botswana

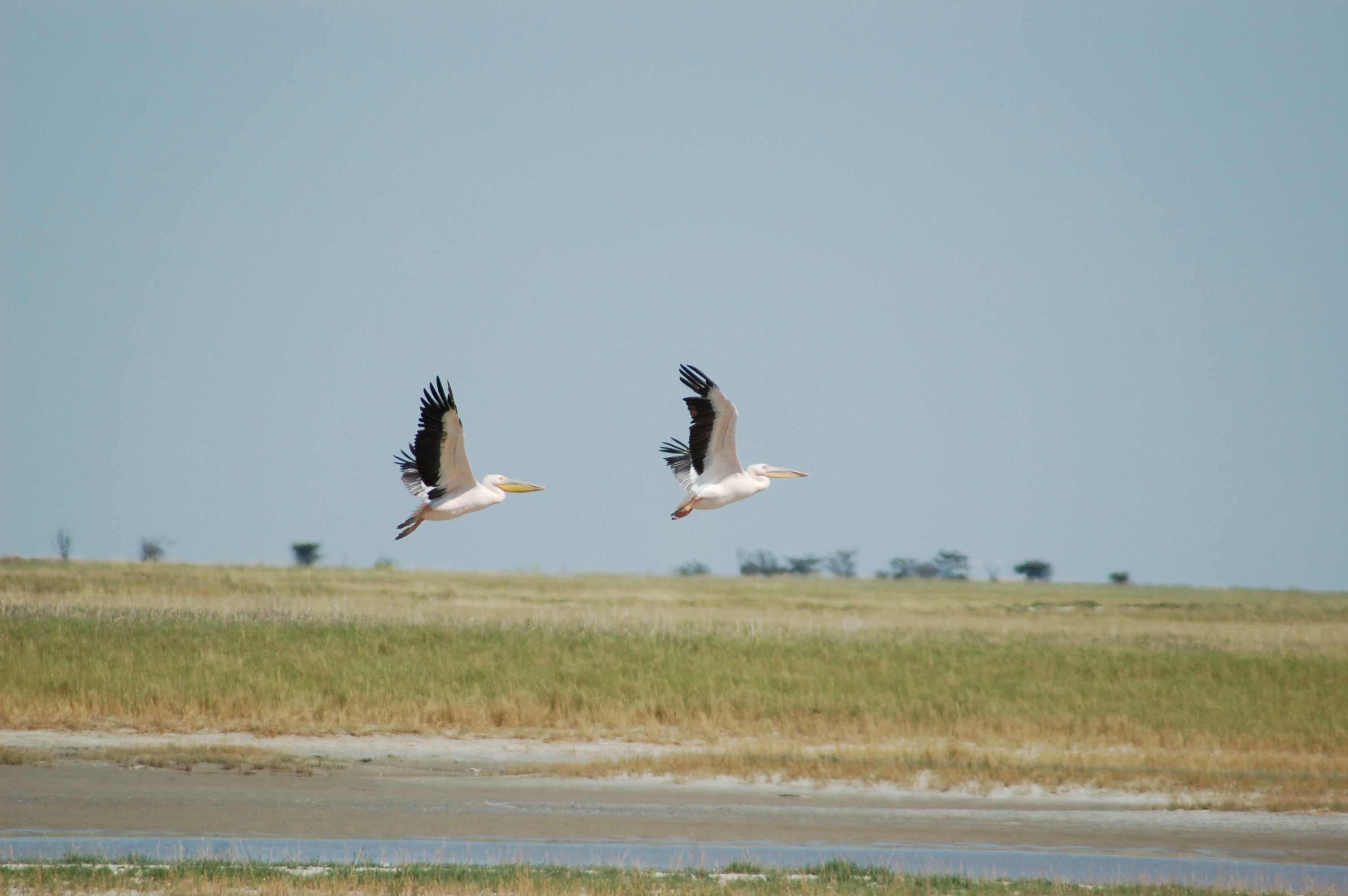
- Pelicans in the Nata Bird Sanctuary

- Location within Botswana
- Location: Botswana
- Nearest city: Nata
- Coordinates: 20°20′08.48″S 26°15′12.33″E
- Area: 230
- Established: 1993

The Nata Bird Sanctuary, the only protected reserve in the northeastern periphery of Sowa Pan in Botswana, is a community-managed project, with assistance from the Nata Conservation Committee and national and international organizations. Founded in 1988, it opened for operations in 1993; it encompasses an area of 230 square kilometres (89 sq mi), with the objective of conservation of wildlife. The community project is managed by a Trust titled the "Kalahari Conservation Society", which has members drawn from the four villages of Nata, Sepako, Maposa and Manxotae in the vicinity of the sanctuary.

The prominent wildlife species in the sanctuary are reported to number 165 bird species. The sanctuary is of international importance due to its population of 250,000 lesser flamingo (Phoenicopterus minor) and greater flamingos (Phoenicopterus roseus), which visit the sanctuary every year during the winter period to breed, after the rainy season, when the water sources are full.

The community-initiated sanctuary received the coveted "Tourism for Tomorrow" award for the Southern Hemisphere in the first year it opened, in 1993.

== Geography ==
The Nata sanctuary is situated at the mouth of the Nata River delta, about 15 kilometres (9.3 mi) from the Nata village at the northeastern border of the Sua Pan (salt pan) within the larger Makgadikgadi. The Makgadikgadi Pans Landscape, located in the Central Kalahari Game Reserve to the southeast of the Okavango Delta, is the most important of natural habitats. It covers wild life conservation parks such as the Makgadikgadi National Park and the Nxai Pan National Park, apart from the Nata Bird Sanctuary, which is "one of the largest breeding sites of Lesser and Greater flamingo in the world."

This region was inhabited by the Nata, Sepako, Maposa and Manxotae communities, who grazed their 3500 and odd cattle in the area. The villagers were persuaded to move their cattle so that a securely fenced sanctuary could be established covering an area of 230 square kilometres (89 sq mi); 45% of the sanctuary lies in the Sua Pan.

A raised wooden platform within the sanctuary provides vistas of the Sua salt pan and the rich bird life of the sanctuary. The roads within the sanctuary are now well maintained. Some areas of the park, where black "cotton" soils are found, can pose problems for road transport during the rainy season.

== History ==
The Nata Conservation Committee began planning in 1988 to establish a bird sanctuary in the delta of the Nata River, to conserve and preserve the wild life, particularly the bird species. These dominate the Sua Pan at the mouth of the Nata River; an ephemeral stream bordering the Sua Pan. The Kalahari Conservation Society, with funds contributed by national and international organisations, is credited with ensuring the voluntary participation of the local people. The local people not only relocated their cattle of about 3,500 heads to adjacent land but also built a network of dirt roads.

Nata Bird Sanctuary, now one of the three breeding grounds of flamingos in Africa, is the largest. It has been recognized by UNESCO as one of the “largest breeding sites of lesser and greater flamingo in the world” and a site of international importance.

== Fauna ==
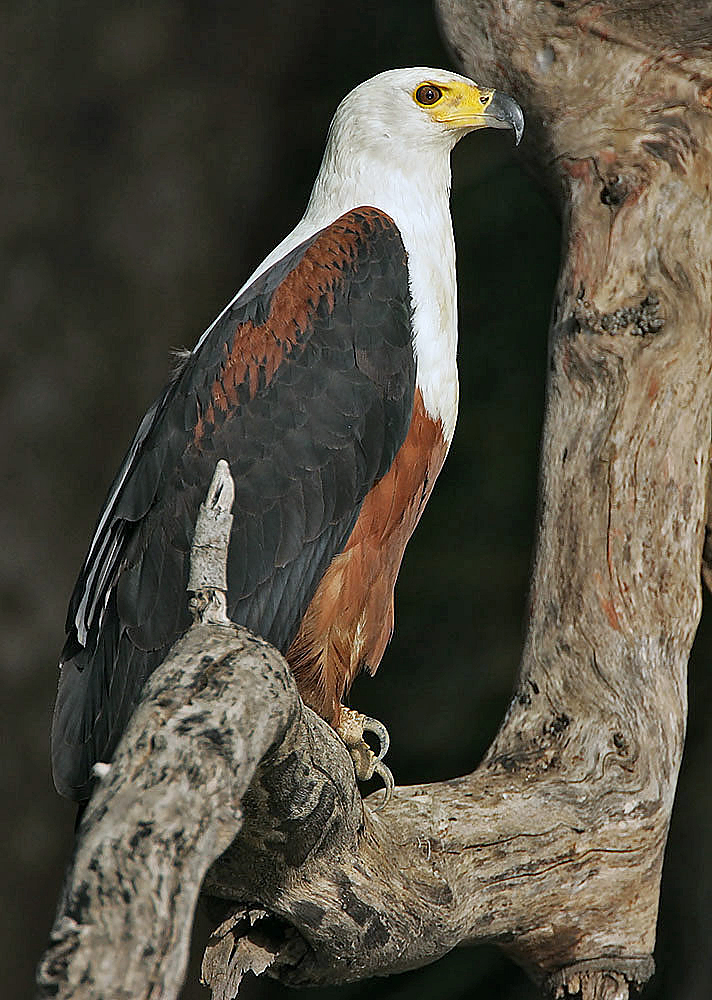
African fish eagle

Among the wild life species noted in the sanctuary are 165 bird species. Other species of wild life are also reported, though of limited numbers.

=== Avifauna ===
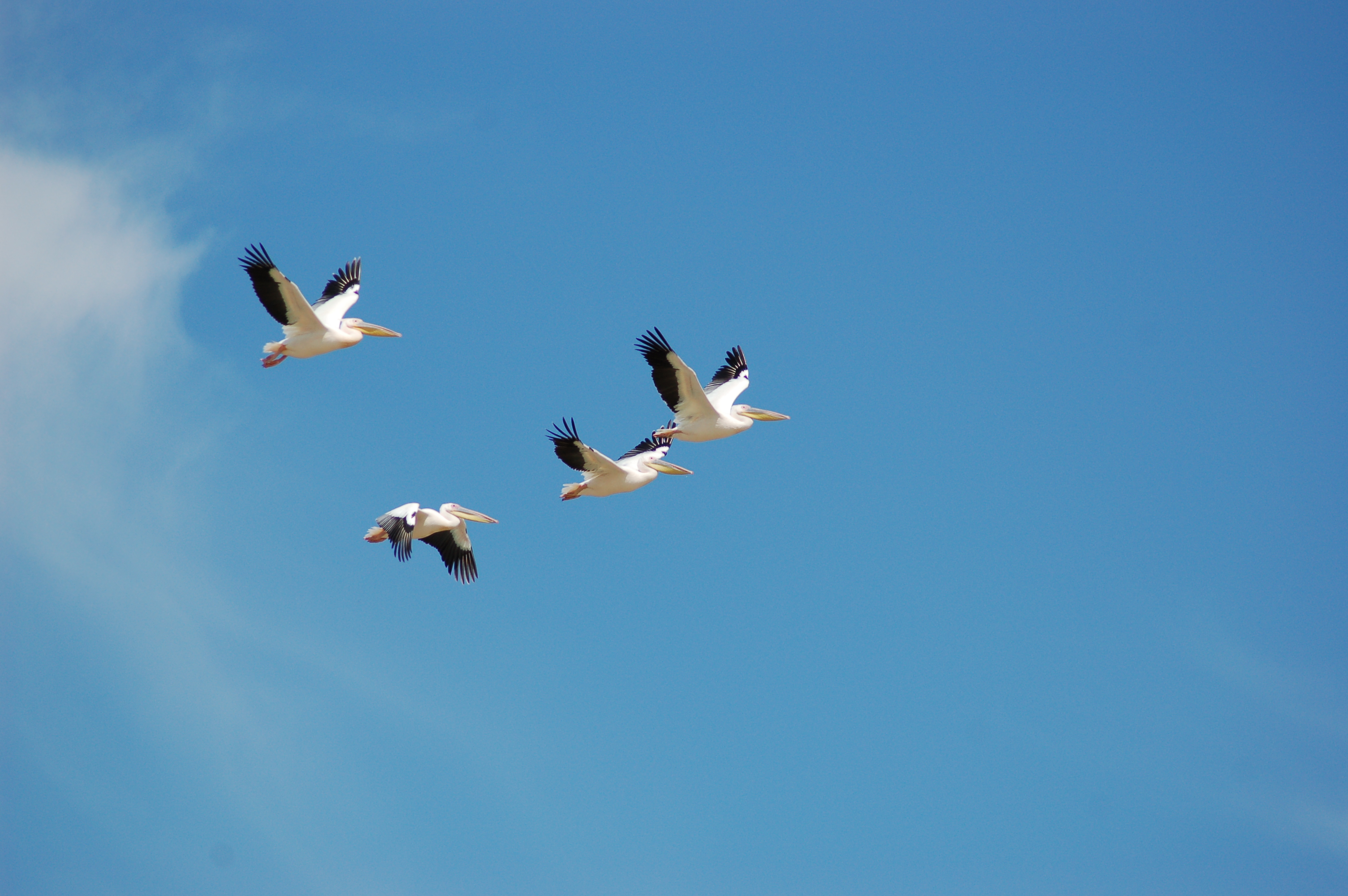
Great white pelican (Pelecanus onocrotalus)

The bird sanctuary has about 165 species of birds; the lesser and greater flamingos, great white pelican (Pelecanus onocrotalus) and pink-backed pelican (Pelecanus rufescens) are the most dominant species, they arrive annually in large numbers as part of their migration during the winter season. Some of the other notable bird species recorded are: avocet, blackwinged stilt (Himantopus himantopus), blacksmith lapwing (Vanellus armatus), black-necked grebe (Podiceps nigricollis), bustards, carmine, darters, African fish eagle (Haliaeetus vocifer), geese, korhaans, pied kingfisher (Ceryle rudis), black-chested snake-eagle (Circaetus pectoralis), blue-cheeked bee-eater (Merops persicus), Cape teal (Anas capensis), kori bustard (Ardeotis kori), blue-billed teal (Spatula hottentota), martial eagle (Polemaetus bellicosus), red-knobbed coot, (Fulica cristata), secretarybird (Sagittarius serpentarius), spoonbills, and white-faced whistling duck (Dendrocygna viduata).

The birds migrate from Etosha, in the border state of Namibia. Greater flamingos feed on brine shrimps (Artemia), worms and tiny crustaceans, while the lesser flamingos feed on algae; all are plentiful in the warm shallow waters of salt pans.

=== Other fauna ===
Other wildlife faunal species reported are: the antelope, hartebeest (Alcelaphus buselaphus), kudu (Tragelaphus imberbis), reedbuck (Redunca arundinum), springbok, steenbok (Raphicerus campestris), springhare (Pedetes capensis), jackals, foxes, monkeys, squirrels, eland (Taurotragus oryx), gemsbok (Oryx gazella) and zebra.
