= Chobe =

Chobe may refer to:

- Chobe District
- Chobe River
- Chobe National Park
- Chobe constituency
