= Dukwi =

Village in Botswana

Coordinates: 20°35′15″S 26°32′3″E

Location of Dukwi

Dukwi is a village in Central District of Botswana. It is located along the road connecting Francistown to Nata. The population was 3,438 in 2011 census.
