= Machana Shamukuni =

Motswana politician (1976-2026)

Minister of Justice
- In office 2022–2024
- President: Mokgweetsi Masisi
- Succeeded by: Nelson Ramaotwana

Minister of Employment, Labour Productivity and Skills Development
- In office 2022–2022
- President: Mokgweetsi Masisi
- Preceded by: Mpho Balopi
- Succeeded by: Office abolished

Member of Parliament for Chobe
- In office 2014–2024

Personal details
- Born: 23 September 1976
- Died: 3 April 2026 (aged 49)
- Citizenship: Botswana
- Party: Botswana Democratic Party
- Occupation: Politician

Machana Ronald Shamukuni (23 September 1976 – 3 April 2026) was a Motswana politician who served as the Minister of Justice from the department's creation in 2022 until 2024. He was a Member of the National Assembly for the constituency of Chobe from 2014–2024.

== Life and career ==
Shamukuni was elected to represent Chobe in the National Assembly in the 2014 general election when he defeated BCP candidate Gibson Nshimwe, receiving 4,114 votes over Nshimwe's 3,166. During his first term, Shamukuni was appointed Assistant Minister of Presidential Affairs. He won reelection in 2019 against UDC candidate Simasiku Mapulanga, receiving 4,575 votes over Mapulanga's 3,200. When his second term began, President Mokgweetsi Masisi did not retain him in the new cabinet. In January 2022, Masisi appointed Shamukuni as the Minister of Employment, Labour Productivity and Skills Development. Later that year, Masisi appointed Shamukuni as minister of the newly created Ministry of Justice. Shamukuni died in April 2026.
