= Mokoboxane =

Coordinates: 21°15′39″S 24°57′1″E

Mokobaxane
- Central District
- Interactive map of Mokobaxane

Population
  - Total: 1,290 in 2,001 census.

Location of Mokobaxane

Mokobaxane is a village in Central District of Botswana. The village is located a few kilometres from a larger village of Mopipi close to Makgadikgadi Pan, and it has a primary school and a clinic . The population was 1,290 in 2001 census.
