= Kedia =

Village in Central District, Botswana

Coordinates: 21°22′20″S 24°41′33″E

Location of Kedia

Kedia is a village in Central District of Botswana. It is located 15 km south-west of a larger village, Mopipi, and it has a primary school. The population was 793 in 2001 census. As of 2022, the Statistics Botswana recorded then population of Kedia village to be at 1,560 people.
