= Nata Airport =

Airport in Botswana

- IATA: none; ICAO: FBNT

Summary
- Serves: Nata, Botswana
- Elevation AMSL: 2,690 ft (820 m)
- Coordinates: 20°12′58″S 26°09′30″E

Map
- Location of airport in Botswana

Runways
Direction	Length		Surface
Direction	m	ft	Surface
09/27	1,100	3,609	Grass
- Source: GCM Google Maps

Nata Airport (ICAO: FBNT) is an airport serving the village of Nata in the Central District of Botswana. The runway is 2 kilometres (1.2 mi) west of the Nata.

== See also ==
- Transport in Botswana
- List of airports in Botswana
