= Mogapi =

Coordinates: 22°19′25″S 27°50′30″E

Location of Mogapi

Mogapi is a village in Central District of Botswana. The village is located 47 km south of Selebi-Phikwe and is less than 100 km from the border with South Africa. The population was 1,814 at the 2001 census.
