= Mmanxotae =

Village in Central District, Botswana

Coordinates: 20°7′1″S 26°23′21″E

Location of Mmanxotae

Mmanxotae is a village in Central District of Botswana. Village is located 25 km north-east of Nata, and it has a primary school. The population was 442 in 2001 census.
