= Natale, Botswana =

Natale
- Village
- Location within Botswana
- Coordinates: 21°6′9″S 27°13′37″E
- Country: Botswana
- District: Central District

Population (2001)
  - Total: 1,117
- Time zone: UTC+2 (CAT)

Natale is a village in Central District of Botswana. The village is located 30 km west of Francistown, and it has a primary school, a kgotla and a Health post.

The population counted 1,117 in the 2001 census.

== See also ==
- Mathangwane
