= Satau =

- Village
- Location of Satau in Botswana
- Coordinates: 18°0′45″S 24°24′22″E
- Country: Botswana
- District: Chobe
- Climate: BSh

Satau is a village in the Chobe District of Botswana, at 18°0′45″ south and 24°24′22″ east. The village is located in the eastern part of the district, which before 2001 formed part of the North-West District. Although a traditional village, Satau it has a primary school, a post office, a health post and a library. Electricity is also available in the village.

Nearby towns and villages include Muyako, Mahundu, Lukuto, Katima Mulilo, Ibbu or Parakarungu. There are 3 airports near Satau. The nearest airport we have records of is Katima Mulilo Airport (IATA: MPA) with a distance of 30 mi (or 48.4 km) North-West of the city centre of Satau.

== Population ==
The population was 730 in the 2001 census (male: 332: female: 398).

== Culture and heritage ==
Claims are that the name Satau was derived from Sekgwa sa Satau or Nandavwe in the native language Sesubia. The local inhabitants of the village are called Basubia, debates about origins of the name Basubia are not new.

The Seperu folk dance is performed by the Basubiya community on ceremonial and festive occasions. The male dancer leads a succession of skilled women dancers (in pairs), wearing layered dresses that take the shape of a peacock's tail. The dance involves clapping hands and swinging the convoluted skirts to disclose colourful layers of folds sown inside, possibly mimicking a peacock. A group of vocalists encircles the dancers, singing and clapping throughout the performance. The dance is transmitted orally and through observation.

Satau has white semi sand dunes and palm tree (mekolwane). With a little number of other tree species the vegetation is appealing to the eye especially during rainy seasons. the village influences the way of life for the local inhabitants. Traditional setswana huts seen in the village.

== Lifestyle ==
Abundance of water during flooding seasons the village which turns it into an island influences the fishing life style of the locals and so is the abundance of palm trees(mekolwane) which is no exception as it plays a role in the basketing weaving lifestyle of these inhabitants.
