= Tshokatshaa =

Coordinates: 20°6′8″S 25°26′19″E

- Central District
- Interactive map of Tshokatshaa

Population
  - Total: 458 in the 2,001 census

Location of Tshokatshaa

Tshokatshaa is a village in Central District of Botswana. It is located 90 km west of Nata, to the north of the road connecting Nata to Maun. The village had a population of 458 in the 2001 census, and has a primary school.
