= Mmeya =

Village in Botswana

Coordinates: 21°5′27″S 26°49′25″E

Location of Mmeya

Mmeya is a village in Central District of Botswana. It is located 60 km west of Francistown. The village has a primary school and the population was 556 in 2001 census.
