= Toromoja =

Coordinates: 21°4′1″S 24°34′14″E

- Central District
- Interactive map of Toromoja

Population
  - Total: 649 in 2,001 census.

Location of Toromoja

Toromoja is a village in Central District of Botswana. The village is located close to Makgadikgadi Pan, in the western part of the district, and it has a primary school. The population was 649 in 2001 census.
