= Ministry of Justice (Botswana) =

Government ministry of Botswana

The Ministry of Justice is the Botswana ministry responsible for overseeing law enforcement. It was created by President Mokgweetsi Masisi in 2022 during a reorganization of the Cabinet of Botswana. Prior to this, the Ministry of Defence, Justice and Security served as the government's justice ministry.

== Ministers of Justice ==
- Machana Ronald Shamukuni (2022–2024)

== Departments ==
- Administration of Justice
- Attorney Generals Chambers
- Industrial Court
- Office of the Ombudsman
- Office of the Receiver

== Parastatals ==
- See also: Botswana Competition Authority
