= Chadibe =

- Location in Botswana
- Coordinates: 21°3′0″S 27°21′0″E
- Country: Botswana
- District: Central District (Botswana)

Population (2011)
  - Total: 4,939

Chadibe (North) is situated west of Francistown, Botswana. The village's population is 5,371, according to Population and Housing Census of 2022.

== Location ==
The town is approximately 25 kilometers west of Francistown. It is accessible via the A30 road, and is located between the Shashe River and the Tlhalogang River.

== Culture ==
Chadibe has cultural celebrations on 29 December.

== Education ==
Chadibe has a primary school, Chadibe Primary School.

== See also ==
- Mathangwane Village
