= Lepashe =

Coordinates: 20°50′10″S 26°40′52″E

Location of Lepashe

Lepashe is a village in Central District of Botswana. It is located west of Francistown, on the banks of Lepashe River. The population was 347 in 2001 census.
