= Kodibeleng =

Coordinates: 23°7′22″S 26°11′43″E

Location of Kodibeleng

Kodibeleng is a village in Central District of Botswana. It is located 99 km away from Central's capital Serowe, and 70 km east of Mahalapye. It has a primary school. The population was 1,206 in a 2001 census.

In a geological survey conducted by Botswana's Geological Survey Department around 1976, it was found that the water table was near to the surface and replenished by seasonal recharge from nearby hills. The main method of drawing water in this village was via deep wells and boreholes, although the water was of variable quality, sometimes salty or fresh. The survey stated that there was cattle farming conducted around 1976, and that livestock and large herds of cattle were the main reason for water usage. Currently, Kodibeleng has the Moralane kraal.

The same geological survey commented that Kodibeleng was "badly overgrazed and unlikely to recover good vegetation unless the cattle are kraaled [enclosed] and the watering point extended over a large area." To add to the village's water woes, the survey found that the water supply was often polluted due surface runoff flowing back into the wells.

Despite the most common mining activity in the Mahalapye sub district being sand mining, Kodibeleng has the Kalahari Gas Project. It is led by the Kalahari Energy Botswana group (KEB), the only company in Botswana dedicated entirely to commercialising the coalbed methane resources in the region. KEB acquired the first coalbed exploration licenses from those relinquished by ISCOR. KEB conducted tests and their results indicated positive gas saturations, which lead the Botswana Government to undertake its own study. The subsequent study indicated "a substantial amount of gas-in-place in the coal ... of the Central Kalahari Karoo Basin." From 2008 to 2015, a drilling rig (RD20) commenced drilling, and a 5-Spot array of wells was completed, which demonstrated strong gas flows.
