= Matlhako =

Coordinates: 22°43′14″S 27°18′32″E

Location of Matlhako

Matlhako is a village in Central District of Botswana. The village is located 25 km south-east of Palapye, and it has a primary school. The population was 679 in 2001 census.
