= Maposa =

Coordinates: 20°5′55″S 26°13′10″E

Location of Maposa

Maposa is a village in Central District of Botswana. It is located 15 km north of Nata, and the village has a primary school. The population was 459 at the 2001 census. It consists mostly of the KhoeSan tribe and some Bakalaka. It has a clinic, primary school and the kgotla.

People mostly depend in farming and rearing of livestock. It has some of Africa's Big 5, such as elephant.
