= Mokgenene =

Village in Central District, Botswana

Coordinates: 23°32′16″S 26°1′34″E

Location of Mokgenene

Mokgenene is a village in Central District of Botswana. It is located 150 km north of the capital city Gaborone. The population was 513 in 2001 census.
