= Motshegaletau =

Coordinates: 22°33′46″S 26°24′40″E

Location of Motshegaletau

Motshegaletau is a village in Central District of Botswana. The village is located 80 km west of Palapye, and it has a primary school. The population was 1,194 in 2001 census.
