= Tutume McConnell Community College =

- Tutume; Botswana

Information
- Type: Government school
- Established: 1941
- Principal: Mr Basoli
- Grades: Form 4 (Grade 11), Form 5 (Grade 12)
- Gender: Co-educational

Tutume McConnell Community College is a government Institution located in Tutume, Botswana.

== See also ==
- Education in Botswana
- Mathangwane Village
