= Sepako =

Coordinates: 19°51′55″S 26°29′39″E

Location of Sepako

Sepako is a village in Central District of Botswana. The village is 50 kilometres (31 mi) north-east of Nata, close to the border with Zimbabwe, and it has a primary school. The population was 627 at the 2001 census.
