= Shashe-Mooke =

- Village
- Location within Botswana
- Coordinates: 21°11′17″S 27°22′43″E
- Country: Botswana
- District: Central District

Population (2022)
  - Total: 5,850
- Time zone: GMT +2
- Climate: BSh

Shashe-Mooke is a large village located in the Central District of Botswana.Shashe-Mooke is located at the south-western edge of Francistown, separated from the city only by the Shashe River, which forms the boundary of Francistown’s city limits. .It had 5,850 inhabitants at the 2022 census, an increase of 2,470 from the 2011 census. This village has 5 wards named Setambule, Muzila, Mophane, Tlholo and Pitsane.

== See also ==
- List of cities in Botswana
- Mathangwane Village
