= Borolong =

- Nickname: Bretz
- Location in Botswana
- Coordinates: 21°6′13″S 27°20′10″E
- Country: Botswana
- District: Central District (Botswana)

Population (2011)
  - Total: 5,184

Borolong is a village in the Central District of Botswana. According to the 2011 census, it had a population of 5,184.

== See also ==
- Mathangwane Village
