= Zoroga =

Botswanan village

Coordinates: 20°9′53″S 25°49′35″E

Location of Zoroga

Zoroga is a village in Central District of Botswana. It is located 40 km west of the Nata village, along the Nata–Maun road. Zoroga has a primary school. Its population was 948 at the time of the 2001 census.
