= Mokubilo =

Coordinates: 21°20′8″S 26°28′29″E

Location of Mokubilo

Mokubilo is a village in Central District of Botswana. It is located 110 km west of Francistown, the second-largest city of Botswana. The village has a primary school, and the population was 1,129 in 2001 census.
