= Taupye =

Coordinates: 23°7′38″S 26°57′47″E

Location of Taupye

Taupye is a village in Central District of Botswana. It is located 15 km east of Mahalapye and the population was 402 in 2001 census.
