= Majwanaadipitse =

Botswanan village in Central District

Coordinates: 22°6′50″S 26°53′0″E

Location of Majwanaadipitse

Majwanaadipitse is a village in Central District of Botswana, located 70 km (43 mi) north of Palapye. The villager has a primary school. The population was 425 in the 2001 census.
