= Mathangwane =

- Motto: We give ourselves to the service of Marcel
- Location of Mathangwane in Botswana
- Coordinates: 21°00′S 27°20′E
- Country: Botswana
- District: Central District
- Sub-District: Tutume
- Constituency: Shashe-West

Government
  - Chief: Itekeng Mathangwane

Population (2011)
  - Total: 5,075
  - Religions: Christianity
- Time zone: UTC+2 (Central Africa Time)
- Area code: 241xxxx

Mathangwane is a village in Botswana's Central District, administered under the Tutume Sub-district Council. Situated approximately 25 kilometres west of Francistown along the A3 highway, the village lies at the confluence of the Shashe and Vukwi rivers. It is predominantly located on the left bank of the Shashe River. According to the 2011 Population and Housing Census, Mathangwane had a population of 5,075.

The village is distinguished by its numerous river valleys, primarily formed by tributaries of the Shashe River. These valleys traditionally serve as natural boundaries for the village's community wards, locally referred to as dikgotlana.

== History ==
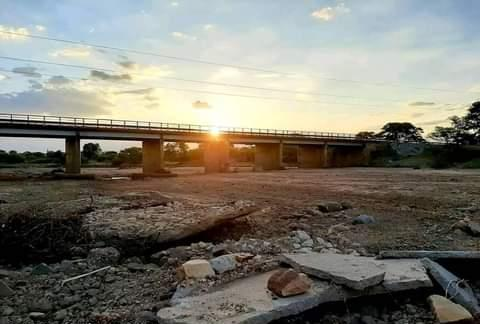
The dual-track A3 highway single carriageway Shashe River Crossing bridge in Mathangwane constructed in the mid-1990s ended vehicle accidents which used to be blamed on evil spirits

The village is historically an ethnic kalanga settlement and is traditionally governed by She Itekeng Mongwaketsi Mathangwane. In 2008, plans were announced to commemorate the village’s centenary, though details of the celebrations remain unclear.

=== Late 20th-century developments ===
During the 1980s, the original narrow bridge over the Shashe River—a critical link to Francistown—gained notoriety for recurrent accidents. Superstitions about a malevolent spirit haunting the bridge circulated widely until its replacement in the mid-1990s. The new dual-track bridge significantly improved safety, halting the historic pattern of accidents.

=== Population growth and land reforms ===
Following Francistown’s designation as a city in 1997 and Zimbabwe's economic and political crises, Mathangwane experienced rapid population growth. Migrants included Botswana citizens from other tribes seeking affordable housing near Francistown and Zimbabwean refugees fleeing persecution. This influx prompted the government to reallocate portions of indigenous residents’ farmland for residential use by newcomers, sparking local tensions.

=== Political reorganization ===
In 2003, Mathangwane became the headquarters of the newly created Tonota-North Constituency after Botswana’s parliamentary constituencies expanded from 40 to 57. However, after heated Kgotla (traditional public assembly) meetings, residents rejected the name "Tonota-North" as culturally incongruous. The constituency was later renamed Shahe-West to reflect local identity.

== Climate ==
=== Climate Chart ===
Climate data for Mathangwane
Month	Jan	Feb	Mar	Apr	May	Jun	Jul	Aug	Sep	Oct	Nov	Dec	Year
Record high °C (°F)	30.1 (86.2)	29.4 (84.9)	29.1 (84.4)	27.4 (81.3)	25.3 (77.5)	22.3 (72.1)	22.7 (72.9)	25.4 (77.7)	29 (84)	31.5 (88.7)	30.8 (87.4)	29.7 (85.5)	27.73 (81.91)
Mean daily maximum °C (°F)	24.1 (75.4)	23.5 (74.3)	22.7 (72.9)	20.5 (68.9)	16.9 (62.4)	13.9 (57.0)	14.2 (57.6)	16.8 (62.2)	20.7 (69.3)	24 (75)	24.3 (75.7)	23.9 (75.0)	20.46 (68.83)
Mean daily minimum °C (°F)	18.2 (64.8)	17.7 (63.9)	16.4 (61.5)	13.6 (56.5)	8.6 (47.5)	5.6 (42.1)	5.7 (42.3)	8.2 (46.8)	12.4 (54.3)	16.5 (61.7)	17.9 (64.2)	18.1 (64.6)	13.24 (55.83)
Average precipitation mm (inches)	102 (4.0)	91 (3.6)	49 (1.9)	27 (1.1)	5 (0.2)	2 (0.1)	0 (0)	1 (0.0)	8 (0.3)	26 (1.0)	66 (2.6)	90 (3.5)	467 (18.4)
Average precipitation days (≥ 0.1 mm)	10	7	5	2	0	0	0	0	1	3	7	9	44
Average relative humidity (%)	60	60	60	51	48	49	45	38	32	34	43	52	48
Source: Climate-Data.org, Mathangwane experienced a record high temperature in January 2016

=== Tropical Cyclone Dineo (2017) ===
In February 2017, Tropical Cyclone Dineo caused severe flooding in Mathangwane and surrounding areas. The storm extensively damaged the A3 highway between Francistown and Sebina Junction, as well as sections north of the village from Nata to Gweta. Temporary road closures were implemented due to safety concerns, disrupting regional traffic. Delays in repairs by the Ministry of Transport and Communications led to hazardous road conditions, contributing to a rise in fatal vehicle accidents near Mathangwane.

== Infrastructure ==
=== Schools ===
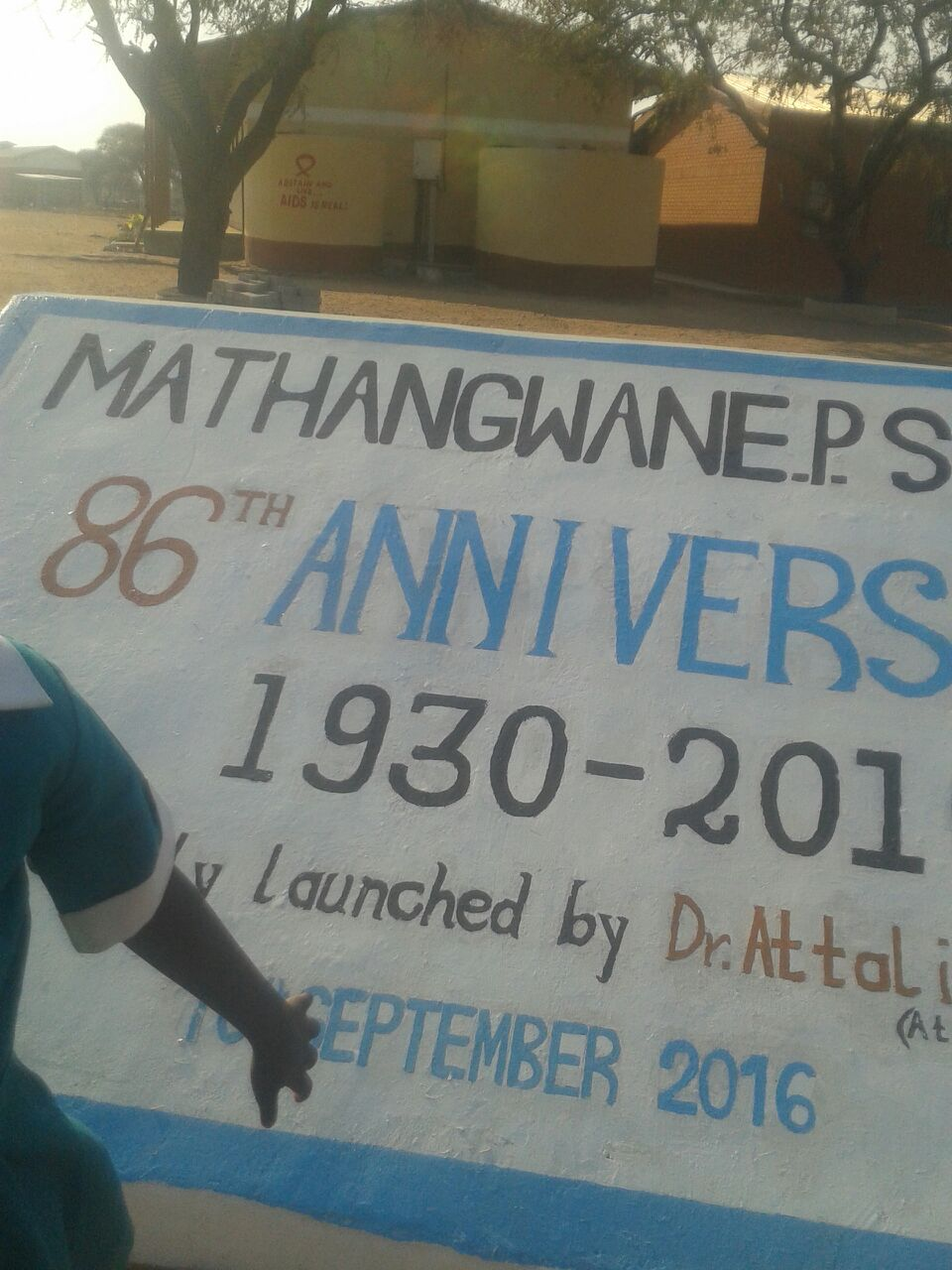
Mathangwane Primary School 86 years anniversary commemorative plaque - 10 September 2016

Mathangwane has two primary schools (Mathangwane Primary School and Mpatane Primary School), one junior secondary school (Chamabona Junior Secondary School) and two day-care centres. The junior secondary school, originally named Chamabona Community Junior Secondary School, was fully incorporated into the government education system in the early 2000s.

After completing junior certificate examinations, students typically enrol at senior secondary schools in neighbouring areas, including Shashe River School, Mater Spei College, Tutume McConnell Community College, or Masunga Senior Secondary School. Limited access to local senior secondary education has historically placed economic strain on low-income families, contributing to high dropout rates and poor performance in Form Five examinations.

=== Roads ===
The A3 highway passes through the village, but all internal roads are unpaved and frequently impassable during heavy rains. Unbridged river valleys exacerbate mobility challenges during rainy seasons due to flash flooding.

In 2007, plans were announced for the Mmandunyane-Shashe Mooke-Borolong-Chadibe-Mathangwane 70 km ), intended to improve local infrastructure. Arup Botswana was contracted for the project, but construction was halted indefinitely due to budget constraints during the 2008 financial crisis.

=== Healthcare facility ===
The village’s sole healthcare facility is Mathangwane Clinic, staffed by general nurses and a part-time medical doctor. Since 2000, upgrades have included a maternity ward and a mobile caravan serving as a Voluntary HIV Counselling and Testing (VCT) Centre. Botswana’s national HIV/AIDS programme, praised by the World Health Organization for its large-scale antiretroviral therapy rollout, supports this initiative. Critically ill patients are referred to Nyangabwe Referral Hospital (Francistown), while severe mental health cases are transferred to Jubilee Hospital.

=== Potable water ===
Mathangwane was connected to the Shashe Dam water supply in 2001, prompting upgrades to the dam’s treatment plant to meet demand. Prior to 2010, water services were administered through Tutume (75 km away). Since the Water Utilities Corporation (WUC), assumed control under the Water Sector Reforms Programme, a local WUC customer service centre has operated in the village.

=== Challenges ===
- Decentralised services: Residents access government programmes in distant towns (e.g., Francistown, Tonota, Tutume), limiting participation.
- Ineffective Village Development Committee (VDC): Unlike comparable villages, Mathangwane lacks community projects (e.g., rental stalls, a community hall) due to alleged politicisation of the VDC. Volunteers often prioritise personal political ambitions over development initiatives.

== Demographics ==
=== Community structure ===
Mathangwane is divided into community wards (dikgotlana), each governed by a sub-chief (Kgosana). The primary wards include:

- Mathangwane (main ward),
- Mpatane,
- Nkuelegwa,
- Mashungwa,
- Matshegong/Mathiwa (colloquially called Palamakuwe, a nickname originating from the ward’s reputation for lively social gatherings in the early 1980s).

Additional wards emerged as the village expanded. Until the early 2000s, Hobona—a settlement 10 km west of Mathangwane along the Francistown-Nata road—functioned as one of the oldest dikgotlana, historically led by Kgosana Seitshwenyeng Hobona.

=== Historical settlement patterns ===
Settlement in Mathangwane likely developed due to access to perennial water from the Shashe and Vukwi rivers. By the late 20th century, the village stretched along the northern and southern riverbanks, with seasonal farmland to the west. The eastern bank of the Shashe River falls within the North East District and is predominantly occupied by commercial farms and ranches administered from Masunga.

Population growth and government-led water reticulation projects in the 2000s prompted residential land allocation on western farmlands previously used by local subsistence farmers. This area became informally known as New Xadi, a reference to Botswana’s government resettlement schemes for San communities displaced from the Central Kalahari Game Reserve.

== Politics ==
=== Historical overview ===
The Botswana Democratic Party (BDP) has dominated Mathangwane’s local government elections since Botswana’s independence in 1965, establishing the village as a BDP stronghold. Mfi Chite, assumed office in October 1974 following a 1972 constitutional amendment that merged Borolong, Chadibe, Makobo, Mathangwane, Natale, and Shashe Mooke into a single local government ward, detached from Tonota. This grouping was partially dissolved in 1982, with Borolong, Natale, and Shashemoke removed to form separate wards. Mfi Chite retained the BDP seat in the 1979 and 1984 general elections before retiring in 1989. His successor, Mfi Rabeka Hulela, served until her death in 1998, after which the seat remained vacant until Mfi Tabona Munyadzwe (BDP) won the 1999 elections.

In 2000, Ookame Ntobedzi (BDP) secured the ward in a by-elections following Munyadzwe’s death. A 2003 constitutional amendment split Mathangwane into Mathangwane North and Mathangwane South wards. The BDP retained both seats in the 2004 general elections, with Ntobedzi representing the southern ward and Mfi Gilbert Nkhukhu the northern ward. After Nkhukhu’s death in 2007, Ipuseng Chikanda (BDP) won the Mathangwane North by-election, maintaining the party’s dominance.

=== Electoral shifts (2009–2010) ===
The 2009 general elections marked a historic shift when the Botswana Congress Party (BCP) secured both wards. In Mathangwane South, James Dlamini (BCP) defeated Ntobedzi, while Kenosi Mabalane (BCP) unseated Chikanda in Mathangwane North. This unprecedented BDP loss prompted opposition accusations of state resource misuse during the 2010 Tonota-North parliamentary by-election, which the BDP ultimately won.

=== BDP comeback (2014–2019) ===
In 2014, constituency boundaries were revised: Tonota North was renamed Shashe-West, and Mathangwane’s two wards merged into a single entity (Mathangwane Ward) after removing Chadibe and Hobona. The BDP regained control in the 2014 general elections, with Nehemiah Gerald Hulela defeating Mabalane. Hulela’s death on 25 November 2018 left the ward vacant until the 2019 elections, echoing a similar vacancy after Mfi Hulela’s death in 1998. like in 1998.

=== Lead-up to the 2019 elections ===
Ahead of the 2019 polls, BDP MP Hon. Fidelis MacDonald Molao announced the revival of the stalled Mmandunyane-Shashe Mooke-Borolong-Chadibe-Mathangwane Road, expanded to 82 km with links to Makobo and Natale. The government revised its rationale for delays, citing homestead relocations instead of the 2008 financial crisis. Two former Village Development Committee (VDC) volunteers contested the ward seat under the BDP and Umbrella for Democratic Change (UDC), reflecting the committee’s politicization.

=== 2019 election results ===
The BDP reclaimed the Mathangwane Ward, with Hon. Samora Gabaake securing 1,250 votes against UDC’s Thabani Modisaotsile (1,022 votes). The party also retained the Shashe-West parliamentary seat, as Molao won 7,181 votes, outpacing UDC’s Alfred Alfa Mashungwa (5,911 votes), Alliance for Progressives’ Gaorewe Keagile (608 votes), and Botswana Patriotic Front’s Blackie Master Ndwapi (483 votes).

== Industry ==
=== Agriculture and livestock ===
The economy of Mathangwane is primarily agrarian, with surrounding areas dominated by crop farming and cattle ranching. Smaller-scale poultry and vegetable farms supply produce to Francistown and local markets.

=== Commerce and services ===
Mathangwane lacks a major shopping centre but hosts a cluster of informal businesses along the Francistown–Nata road. These include shops selling clothing, fast food, alcohol, building materials, and vehicle parts. Seasonal hair salons, specialising in Afro-textured hairstyles, thrive during festive periods. A small but stable sector comprises brick-moulding enterprises producing concrete-pressed bricks for residential construction.

Trade services such as metalwork, plumbing, bricklaying, and electrical installations are provided by independent artisans operating within the informal sector.

=== Real estate and construction ===
Proximity to Francistown has spurred demand for housing, with an influx of city workers seeking rental properties or land purchases. This has driven rapid property value appreciation in the village. However, growth in formal job creation remains limited.

=== Challenges ===
High crime rates have discouraged permanent settlement and stifled micro business development, hindering broader economic diversification.

== Sports ==
=== Football ===
Football is the most popular sport in Mathangwane. The village hosts an annual Mathangwane Festive Football Tournament, commencing on 25 December with opening group matches. The tournament features two groups of five teams competing in a round-robin format, in which each team is scheduled to where each team plays four matches within their group. Teams earn three points for a win, one for a draw, and none for a loss. The top two teams from each group advance to the knockout stage, held on New Year's Day. The knockout phase includes semi-finals (group winners vs. runners-up), a third-place playoff (serving as a curtain-raiser, and the final to determine the champion.

=== Sponsorship and awards ===
Local businesses and individuals sponsor the tournament, contributing prize money for achievements such as "Top Scorer" and "Player of the Tournament." The top three teams receive medals (gold, silver, and bronze), while the champions retain a trophy until the next tournament.

=== Logistics and funding ===
Spectators pay an entrance fee, with higher charges for vendors. Funds cover referee payments, security for the final day, and logistics. During group stages, security is managed by team representatives. Matches are held on a single playing ground, averaging four games daily with brief breaks, and conclude by the year’s end.

== Botswana 50 years of Independence Celebrations ==
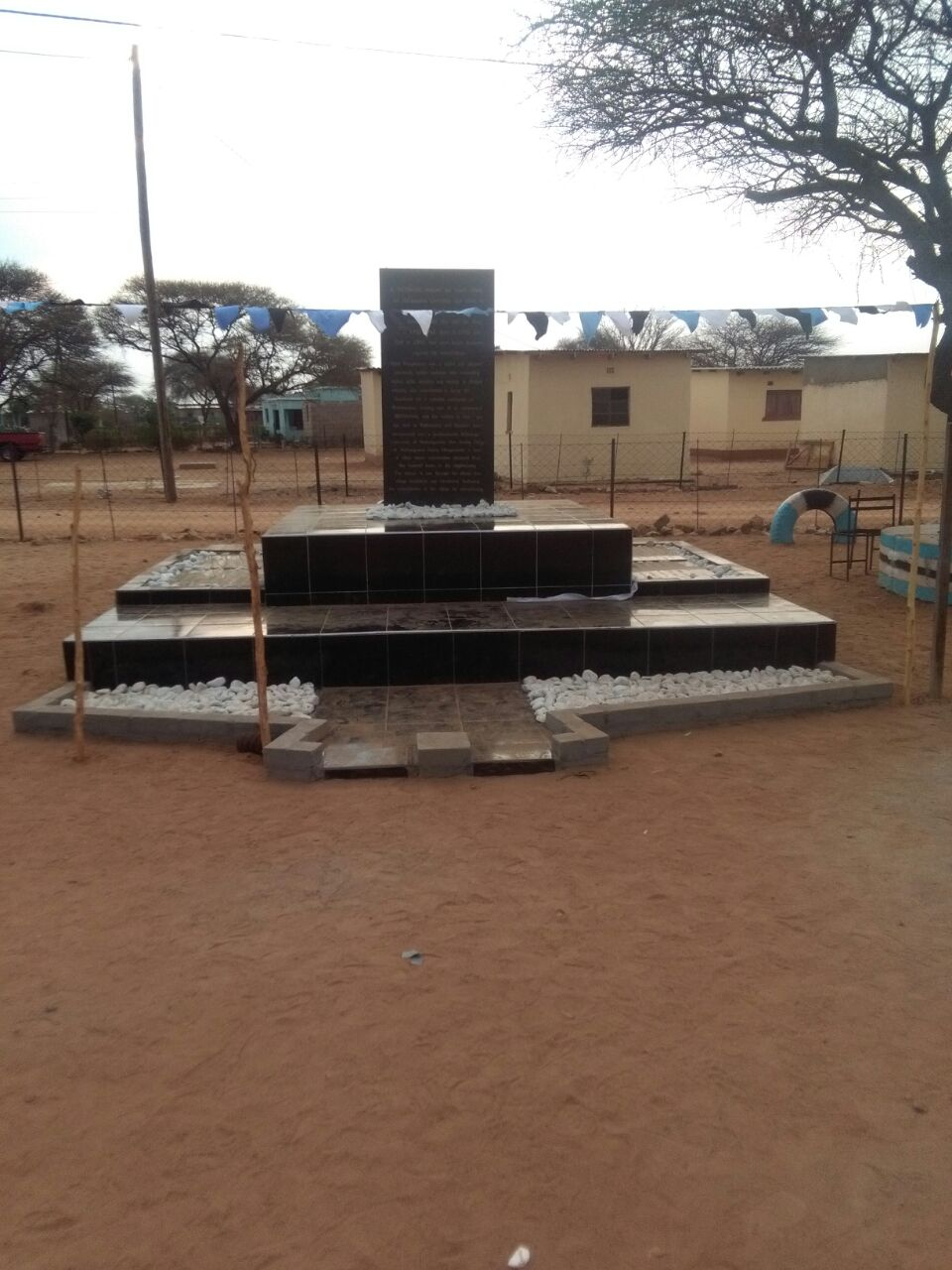
50 years of independence Commemorative plaque in Mathangwane

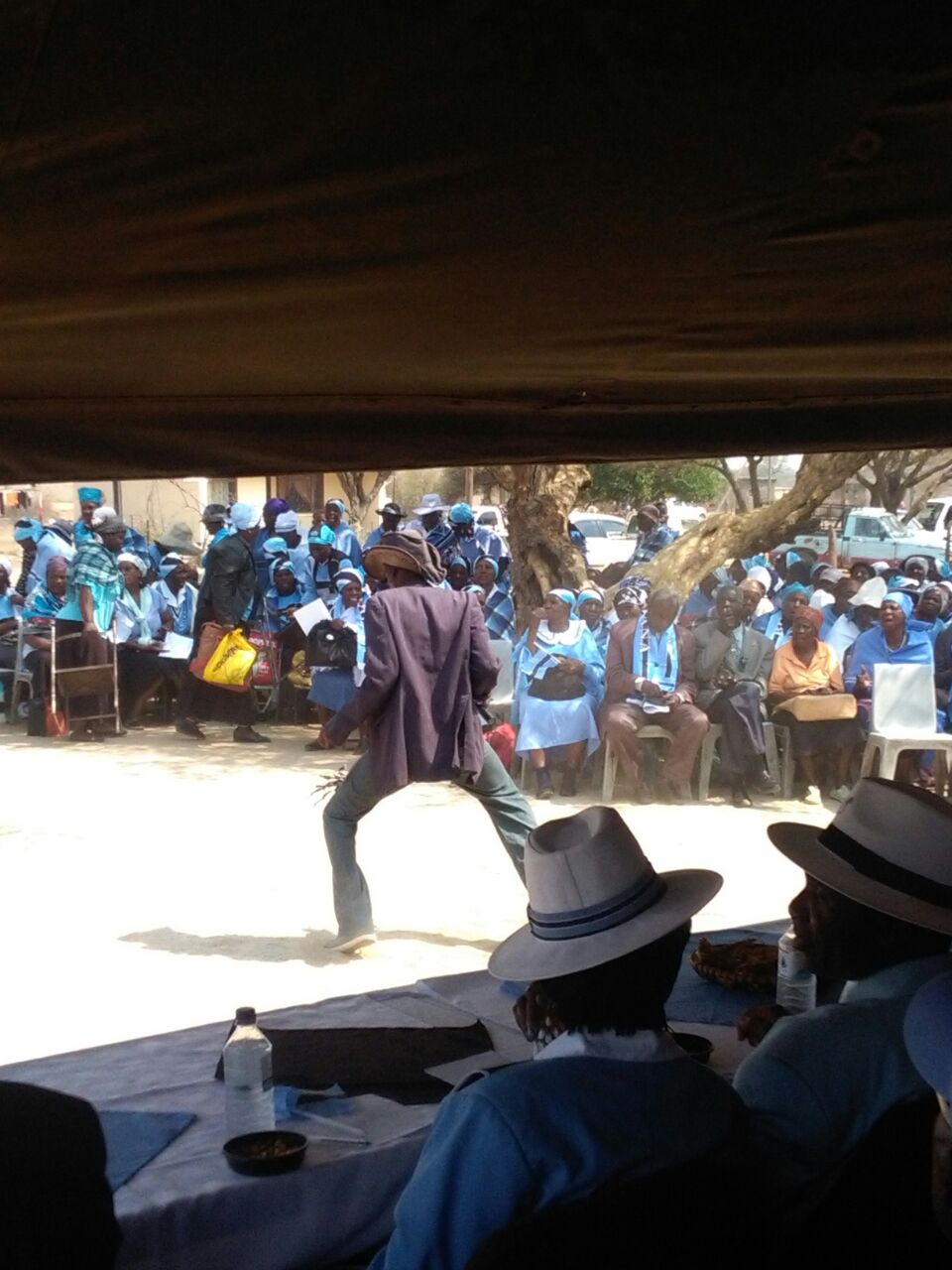
A performer in Mathangwane Main Kgotla during the 50 years of independence celebrations

Mathangwane commemorated Botswana’s 50th anniversary of independence on 30 September 2016, alongside villages nationwide. Celebrations were held at the Main Kgotla, where a commemorative plaque was unveiled near the site. The event featured performances by local churches, traditional dance groups, and village elders representing each ward, who entertained attendees with songs, dances, and poetry. The occasion marked the first time in recent history that the Main Kgotla reached full capacity, drawing unprecedented attendance from both youth and elders.

== See also ==
- Economy of Botswana
- Education in Botswana
- Health in Botswana
- Human rights in Botswana
