= Gamabuo =

Coordinates: 22°37′40″S 26°21′29″E

Location of Gamabuo

Gamabuo is a village in Central District of Botswana. The village is located 50 km south-west of Serowe, and the population was 605 in 2001 census.
