= Kudumatse =

Coordinates: 23°24′28″S 27°8′30″E

Location of Kudumatse

Kudumatse is a village in Central District of Botswana. The village is located close to the border with South Africa, and it has primary and secondary schools. The population was 1,339 as of 2001.
