= Khwee =

Coordinates: 21°56′42″S 25°26′47″E

Location of Khwee

Khwee is a village in Central District of Botswana. It is located 60 km south of the mining town Letlhakane, and it has a primary school. The population was 477 in 2001 census.
