= Malatswai =

Coordinates: 21°51′29″S 26°5′12″E

Location of Malatswai

Malatswai is a village in Central District of Botswana. The village is located 110 km north-west of Serowe, and it has a primary school. The population was 872 in 2001 census.
