= Mogapinyana =

Coordinates: 22°22′58″S 27°33′40″E

Location of Mogapinyana

Mogapinyana is a village in Central District of Botswana. The village is located 60 km north-east of Palapye and the population was 1,433 in 2001 census.
