= Makwate =

Village in Central District of Botswana

Coordinates: 23°17′46″S 27°16′43″E

Location of Makwate

Makwate is a village in Central District of Botswana. The village is located close to river Limpopo and the border with South Africa, and it has primary school. The population was 5,687 in 2011 census.
