= Mogome =

Village in Botswana

Coordinates: 22°48′28″S 26°59′56″E

Location of Mogome

Mogome is a village in Central District of Botswana. The village is located locate along the road connecting Palapye and Mahalapye, approximately at a distance of 50 km from either town. Mogome has a primary school, and the population was 371 in 2001 census.
