= Topisi =

Coordinates: 22°10′49″S 27°15′7″E

Location of Topisi

Topisi is a village in Central District of Botswana. The village is located 55 km north of Palapye, along the Palapye–Francistown road, and the population was 1,289 in 2001 census.
