= Botlogile Tshireletso =

Motswana politician

Minister of Local Government and Rural Development
- In office 2018
- Constituency: Mahalapye East

Botlogile Tshireletso is a Botswana politician, mother and legislator who has served as assistant Minister of Local Government and Rural Development in the Cabinet of Botswana, since 2004. She has served as the elected member of parliament, representing Mahalapye East constituency, in the Parliament of Botswana. Before being a member of parliament, Mmantshire, as she is affectionately known in Mahalapye her home village, served as a council member for Xhosa 1 ward. She was a councilor for 25 years and a member of parliament for 15 years.

== Early life and education ==
Tshireletso holds a Certificate in Political Education from Tashkent University, in Russia (today Uzbekistan).

== Political career ==
Botlogile Tshireletso made her political debut in 1978, after she was recruited by Resaapele Senai. At that time, all she was armed with was a six-year old ‘forced marriage certificate’ which she has said did not add any value to her life.

She was raised up in a family of staunch Botswana Democratic Party (BDP) supporters. Tshireletso has gone to tell BOPA (Botswana Printing Agency) in an interview that by age of 23, she felt indifferent towards politics as she dreamt of having a professional certificate. Tshireletso would later be lured by veteran politicians to the Mahalapye BDP office where she was hired to do a menial job. She was tasked with recruiting new members and worked hard keep them active, unknowingly, this began her lifetime a political career.

Prior to becoming an MP, the mother of three was a Councillor for Mahalapye East ward (before the delimitation exercise). She was also at one point the chairperson of the Central District Council (CDC). Tshireletso was at CDC for 25 years. She has been in Parliament since 2004.

== See also ==
- Cabinet of Botswana
- Parliament of Botswana
