= Chobe (Botswana constituency) =

Parliamentary constituency in the Chobe District of Botswana, 2004 onwards

- Single-member constituency for the National Assembly
- District: Chobe
- Population: 28,777
- Major settlements: Kasane
- Area: 21,037 km^{2}

Current constituency
- Created: 2002
- Party: BCP
- Created from: Maun/Chobe
- MP: Simasiku Mapulanga
- Margin of victory: 2,853 (34.5 pp)

Chobe is a parliamentary constituency in the Chobe District that was created in 2002. It has been represented in the National Assembly of Botswana since 2024 by Simasiku Mapulanga of the Botswana Congress Party.

== Constituency profile ==
The constituency was created in 2002 with the division of Maun/Chobe into three constituencies (Maun West, Maun East and Chobe). Since its creation Chobe has mainly voted for BDP candidates, except in 2009, when it voted for the BCP. It is contiguous with the Chobe District and contains the following villages:

1. Kasane
2. Lesoma
3. Mabele
4. Muchenje
5. Pandamatenga
6. Kachikau
7. Kavimba
8. Satau
9. Parakarungu
10. Kazungula

== Members of Parliament ==
Key: BDP BCP

Election	Winner
2004 election	Duncan Mlazie
2009 election	Gibson Nshimwe
2014 election	Machana Shamukuni
2019 election	Machana Shamukuni
2024 election	Simasiku Mapulanga

== Election results ==
=== 2024 election ===
General election 2024: Chobe
Party	Candidate	Votes	%	±%
BCP	Simasiku Mapulanga	5,238	63.31	N/A
BDP	Luckson Likokoto	2,385	28.83	−30.01
UDC	Victor Liwena	481	5.81	−35.35
BPF	Simwanza Rakaru	148	1.79	N/A
Independent	Sinka Kachana	21	0.25	N/A
Margin of victory		2,853	34.49	N/A
Total valid votes		8,273	98.68	−0.62
Rejected ballots		111	1.32	+0.62
Turnout		8,384	76.83	−6.49
Registered electors		10,912		
BCP gain from BDP		Swing	+46.66	

=== 2019 election ===
General election 2019: Chobe
Party	Candidate	Votes	%	±%
BDP	Machana Shamukuni	4,575	58.84	+1.92
UDC	Simasiku Mapulanga	3,200	41.16	−1.92
Margin of victory		1,375	17.68	+4.74
Total valid votes		7,775	99.30	+0.31
Rejected ballots		55	0.70	−0.31
Turnout		7,830	83.32	+1.08
Registered electors		9,398		
BDP hold		Swing	+1.92	

=== 2014 election ===
General election 2014: Chobe
Party	Candidate	Votes	%	±%
BDP	Machana Shamukuni	4,114	56.92	+9.96
BCP	Gibson Nshimwe	3,166	43.08	−7.95
Margin of victory		948	13.02	N/A
Total valid votes		7,280	98.99	+0.44
Rejected ballots		74	1.01	−0.44
Turnout		7,354	81.20	+5.34
Registered electors		8,965		
BDP gain from BCP		Swing	+8.96	

=== 2009 election ===
General election 2009: Chobe
Party	Candidate	Votes	%	±%
BCP	Gibson Nshimwe	3,717	51.03	+8.29
BDP	Duncan Mlazie	3,170	46.96	−3.94
BNF	Abidile Nkwane	131	2.01	−4.35
Margin of victory		547	4.07	N/A
Total valid votes		6,510	98.55	−0.31
Rejected ballots		96	1.45	+0.31
Turnout		6,606	75.86	−0.53
Registered electors		8,708		
BCP gain from BDP		Swing	+6.12	

=== 2004 election ===
General election 2004: Chobe
Party	Candidate	Votes	%
BDP	Duncan Mlazie	2,650	50.90
BCP	Gibson Nshimwe	2,225	42.74
BNF	Albert Chamba	331	6.36
Margin of victory		425	8.16
Total valid votes		5,206	98.86
Rejected ballots		60	1.14
Turnout		5,266	76.39
Registered electors		6,894	
BDP win (new seat)			
