= Matsitama =

Coordinates: 21°1′20″S 26°41′6″E

Location of Matsitama

Matsitama is a village in Central District of Botswana. The village is located 100 km west of Francistown, the second largest city in Botswana, and has a primary school. The population was 1,030 in 2001 census.
