= Mokoswane =

Coordinates: 23°18′0″S 26°58′12″E

Location of Mokoswane

Mokoswane is a village in Central District of Botswana. The village is located 30 km south-east of Mahalapye, and it has a primary school. In a 2001 census, the village's population was 362.
