= Mopipi =

- Central District
- Location within Botswana
- Coordinates: 21°12′7″S 24°52′6″E
- Country: Botswana
- District: Central District

Population (2001)
  - Total: 3,066

Mopipi is a village in Central District of Botswana. It is located close to Makgadikgadi Pan. The population was 3,066 in 2001 census. This village was named after a tree called Mopipi, which is commonly found in the region. This area has witnessed steady acidification and desertification since the Pleistocene, but perhaps most dramatically since the 19th century. In particular, the Boteti River used to flow year around in this area on its way to discharge to the Makgadikgadi Pans, but presently this flow is only in the rainy season.

The village has grown since 2001, nowadays there are more services and it is the investment hotspot of Boteti West. Companies like Super Power Complex and Saverite have take the village by storm as of 2021 and other bigger companies are taking interest there as the tourism industry and agricultural industry are booming with more people starting commercial farming.
