= Boyce Sebetela =

Motswana politician

- Born: Boyce Lephimotswe Sebetela
- Occupations: Politician, chief of staff
- Known for: Botswanan and Pan-African former parliament member, chief of staff to president Mokgweetsi Masisi

Boyce Lephimotswe Sebetela is a Motswana politician who formerly served as a member of the Pan-African Parliament and Parliament of Botswana representing Palapye, and has served as Botswana’s first Chief of Staff since 2021. Previously, he worked as Head of Strategy for Debswana.
