= Moreomabele =

Village in Botswana

Coordinates: 22°3′2″S 27°15′45″E

Location of Moreomabele

Moreomabele is a village in Central District of Botswana. It is located 75 km north of Palapye, along the road from Palapye to Francistown, and it has a primary school. The population was 478 in 2001 census.
