= Lepashe River =

River in Botswana

Coordinates: 20°52′S 26°16′E

The Lepashe River is a natural watercourse in Botswana. It shares its name with the village of Lepashe, through which the river flows. The Lepashe River discharges to the Sua Pan. There are significant gravel resources along some reaches of the Lepashe River.

== See also ==
- Makgadikgadi Pans
