= Mokgware =

Village in Central District, Botswana

Coordinates: 22°46′19″S 26°47′47″E

Location of Mokgware

Mokgware is a village in Central District of Botswana. The village is located 50 km north of Mahalapye, and it has a primary school. The population was 335 at the 2001 census.
