= Chobe District =

Coordinates: 18°30′S 25°00′E

- District
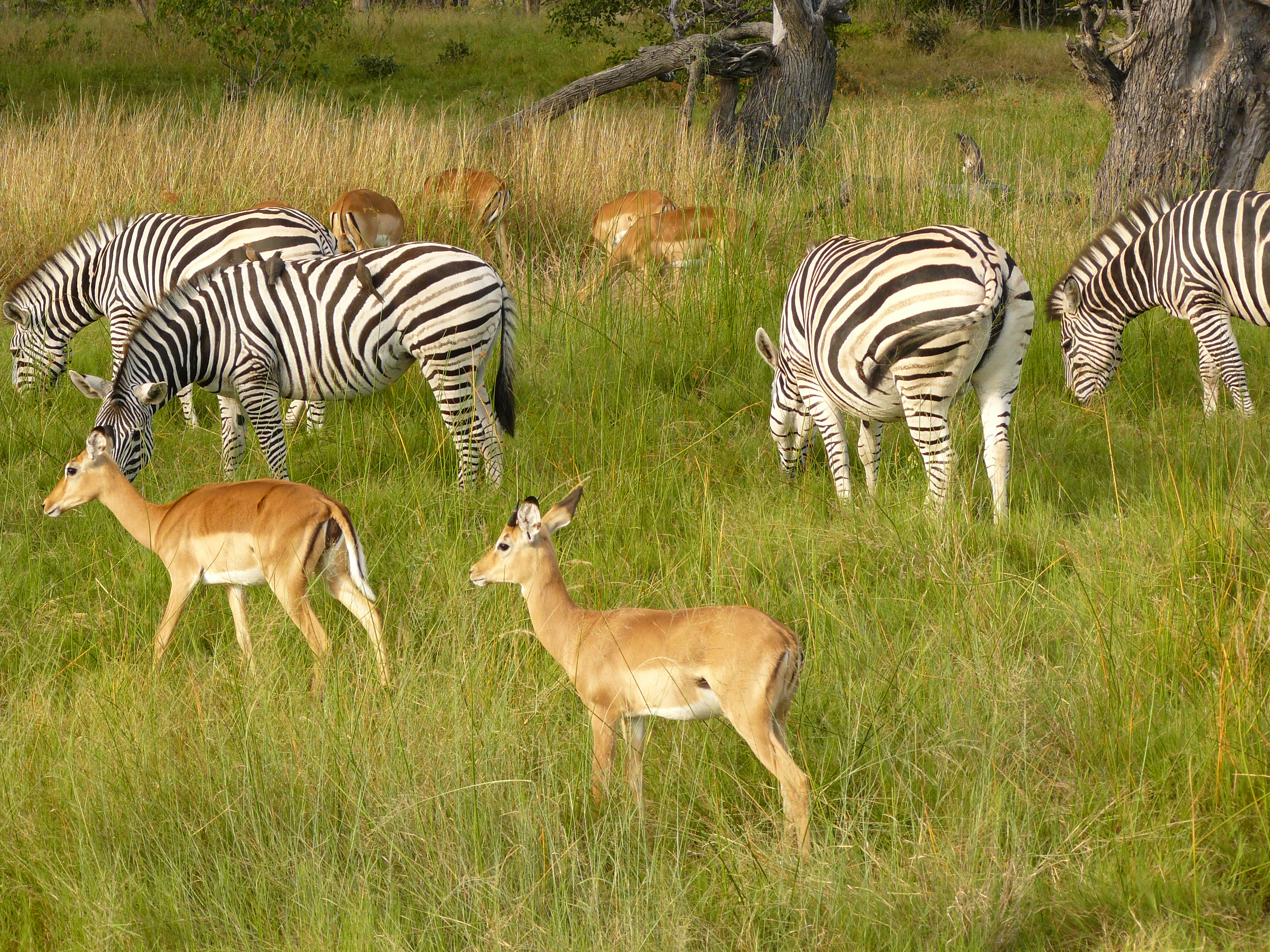
- Game area in Chobe National Park

- Country: Botswana
- Established: 10 february 2006
- Capital: Kasane

Area
  - Total: 20,800 km^{2} (8,000 sq mi)

Population (2022 census)
  - Total: 28,743
  - Density: 1.38/km^{2} (3.58/sq mi)
- Time zone: UTC+2 (Central Africa Time)
- HDI (2019): 0.708 high · 7th

Chobe District is an administrative district in the northern part of Botswana, with the headquarters in Kasane. In 2001 it was merged with Ngamiland, and until 2006 it shared with Ngamiland the North-West District Council as local government. Chobe National Park is in the Chobe District. As of 2011, the total population of the district was 23,347 compared to 18,258 in 2001. The growth rate of population during the decade was 2.49. The total number of workers constituted 12,059 with 6,113 males and 5,947 females, with majority of them working in public administration.

Kasane and Chobe National Park, the second largest national park in the country, are the major tourist attractions in the district. Chobe National Park also has the largest population of elephants in Africa. The district shares the international border of the country with Namibia and Zambia in the north, Zimbabwe in the east, and also the district borders along North-West district of the country.

The District is made up of nine villages, which are Kasane, Kachikau, Kazungula, Kavimba, Lesoma, Mabele/Muchinje, Parakarungu, Pandamatenga and Satau. Kasane is the urban center of the District.

== Geography ==
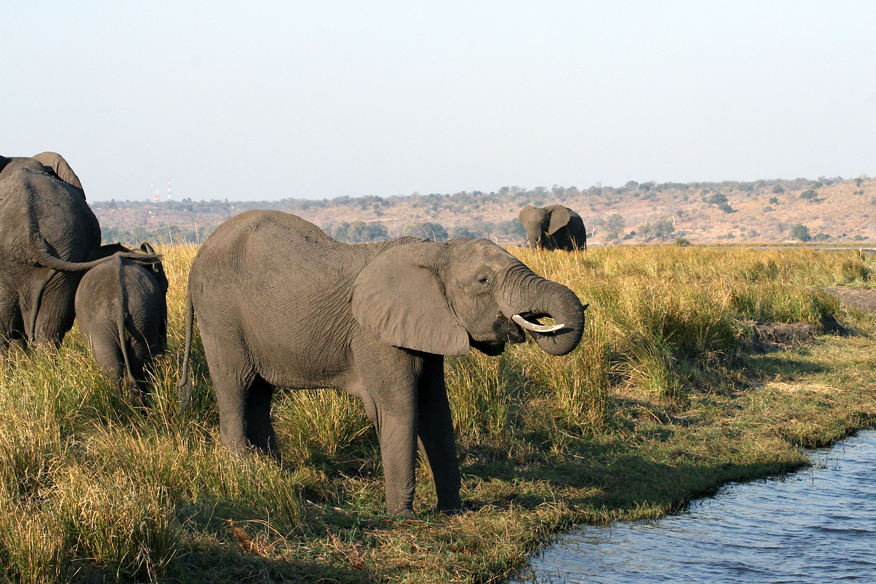
Game area in Chobe National Park

Kasane, Chobe National Park, Seboba Water Rapids, Pandamatenga Farms, Lesoma Memorial Monument, Kasane Hot Springs and Chobe River are the major tourist attractions in the district. Most part of Botswana has tableland slopes sliding from east to west. The region has an average elevation of around 915 m (3,002 ft) above the mean sea level. The vegetation type is Savannah, with tall grasses, bushes and trees. The annual precipitation is around 65 cm (26 in), most of which is received during the summer season from November to May. Most of the rivers in the region are seasonal, with Chobe River, which are prone to flash floods, being the most prominent. Chobe National Park is the second largest national park in the country and has the largest population of elephants in Africa. The district shares the international border of the country with Namibia and Zambia in the north, Zimbabwe in the east, and also the district borders along North-West district of the country.

== Culture ==
There are a number of ethnic groups which are found in the District. The Basubiya are found mainly at Parakarungu, Satau, Kavimba and Mabele. They are most dominant in Satau and Parakarungu. The Batawana are found in Kachikau and they are dry land farmers and pastoralists, they now practice molapo farming. In Pandamatenga the dominant tribe is Basarwa and they have moved from being hunters and gathers to ploughing. In Kasane there are a number of ethnic groups who came to the area looking for employment.

== Demographics ==
Historical population
Year	Pop.	±%
1981	7,934	—
1991	14,126	+78.0%
2001	18,258	+29.3%
2011	23,347	+27.9%
2022	28,743	+23.1%

As of 2011, the total population of the district was 23,347 compared to 18,258 in 2001. The growth rate of population during the decade was 2.49. The population in the district was 1.15 per cent of the total population in the country. The sex ratio stood at 106.17 for every 100 males, compared to 106.00 in 2001. The average house hold size was 2.45 in 2011 compared to 3.60 in 2001. There were 943 craft and related workers, 573 clerks, 2,053 people working in elementary occupation 186 legislators, administrators and managers, 1,083 plant and machine operators and assemblers, 128 professionals, 1,377 service workers, shop and market sales workers, 243 skilled agricultural and related workers, and 296 technicians and associated professionals, making the total work force 6,888.

== Education and economy ==
As of 2011, there were a total of 11 schools in the district, with 1.70 per cent private schools. The total number of students in the Council schools was 3,217 while it was 64 in private schools. The total number of students enrolled in the district was 3,281: 1,587 girls and 1,694 boys. The total number of qualified teachers was 154, 98 female and 56 male. There were around 16 temporary teachers, 6 male and 22 female. There was 1 untrained teacher in the district.

As of 2006, 1,260 were involved in Agriculture, 322 in Construction, 236 in Education, 76 in Electricity & Water, 095 in Finance, 070 in Foreign Mission, 236 in Health, 510 in Hotels & Restaurants, 314 in Manufacturing, 107 in Private Households, 1,743 in Public Administration, 194 in Real Estate, 185 in Transport & Communications, and 681 in Wholesale & Retail Trade. The total number of workers constituted 12,059 with 6,113 males and 5,947 females.

== Administration ==
Botswana gained independence from the British in 1966 and adapted the colonial administration framework to form its district administration. The policies were modified during 1970–74 to address some of the basic issues. The district is administered by a district administration and district council which are responsible for local administration. The policies for the administration are framed by the Ministry of Local Government. The major activities of the council are Tribal Administration, Remote Area Development and Local Governance. The executive powers of the council are vested on a commissioner appointed by the central government. Technical services wing of the Department of Local Government is responsible for developing roads, infrastructure in villages like water supply, schools and recreational facilities. All the staff of the local administration except District Administration are selected via Unified Local Government Services (ULGS) and the Ministry of Local Government is responsible for their training, deployment and career development. Chobe district was established during July 2008 and is not sub-divided.

== Village ==
- Satau
