= Nata, Botswana =

Coordinates: 20°12′38″S 26°10′50″E

Nata
- Central District
- Interactive map of Nata

Population
  - Total: 7,713 at the 2,022 census.

Location of Nata

Nata is a village in the Central District of Botswana. Located in the north of the district about 200 km (124 miles) from the city of Francistown, the village is served by Nata Airport. The population was 7,713 at the 2022 census, with a growth rate of 1.3% from 6,714 at the 2011 census. The village of Nata lies along the Nata River, which carries its rainy season flow to the Makgadikgadi Pans, a seasonal hypersaline lake, in one of the largest salt flats in the world. The village serves as a crossroads for routes to Maun and Kasane, providing essential services to travelers.

The village has 6 wards, namely: Sekao, Maaloso, Kachikao, Manakanagore, Makwenaejang and Basimane.

== See also ==
- Zoroga
- Mathangwane Village
