= Central District (Botswana) =

Central
- District
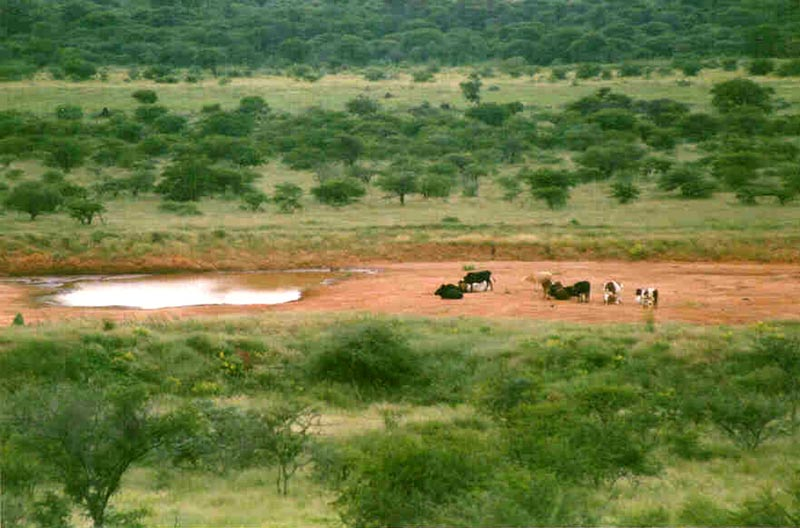
- Waterhole in Serowe

- Location within Botswana
- Coordinates: 22°00′S 26°00′E
- Country: Botswana
- Capital: Serowe

Area
  - Total: 147,730 km^{2} (57,040 sq mi)

Population (2022 census)
  - Total: 706,135
  - Density: 4.7799/km^{2} (12.380/sq mi)
- Time zone: UTC+2 (Central Africa Time)
- HDI (2019): 0.712 high · 6th

Central is the largest of Botswana's districts in terms of area and population. It encompasses the traditional homeland of the Bamangwato people. Some of the most politically connected Batswana have come from the Central District, including former President Sir Seretse Khama, former President Festus Mogae, and former President Lt. General Seretse Ian Khama. The district borders the Botswanan districts of Chobe in the north, North-West in the northwest, Ghanzi in the west, Kweneng in southwest, Kgatleng in the south and North-East in the northeast, as well as Zimbabwe also in the northeast (Matabeleland North and Matabeleland South Provinces) and South Africa in the southeast (Limpopo Province).

As of 2022, the total population of the district was 706,135 compared to 638,604 in 2011. The growth rate of population during the decade was 0.96. The population in the district was 29.9 per cent of the total population in the country. Main population centers in Central include Palapye and Serowe, two of Africa's largest traditional villages. The district also contains tributaries of the Limpopo River, which are prone to flash floods when sudden rainstorms drain eastward into the Limpopo. The district is administered by a district administration and district council which are responsible for local administration. The total number of workers constituted 186,943 with 95,717 males and 91,221 females, with a majority working in transport and communication sector.

== Geography ==
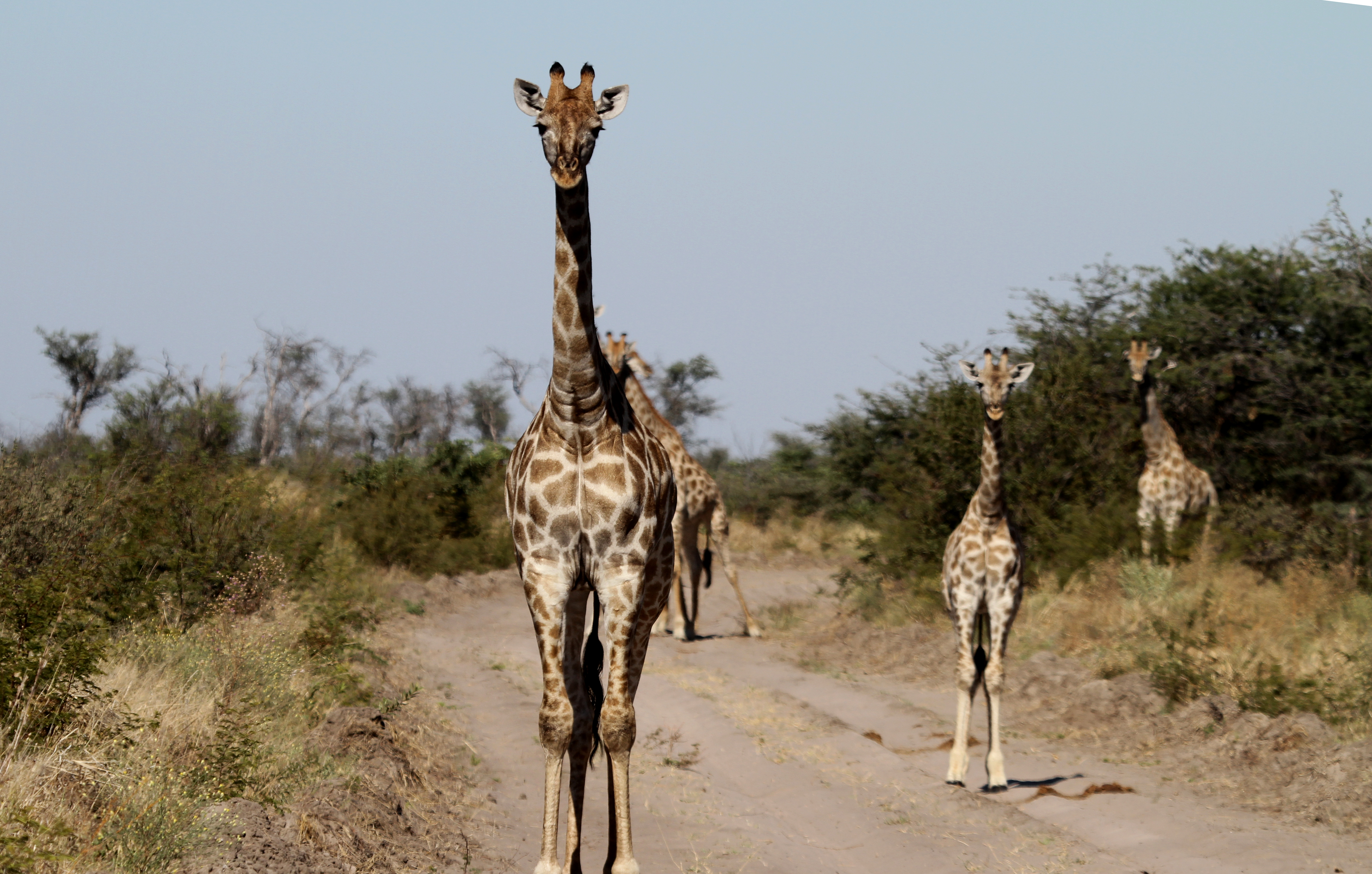
Wildlife around Boteti river

In the northeast, Central borders Zimbabwe's Matabeleland North and Matabeleland South Provinces, and in the southeast Central borders South Africa's Limpopo Province. It borders North-East in the northeast, Kgatleng in the south, Kweneng in southwest, Ghanzi in the North and North-West in the northwest direction. The major tourists attractions and game areas in the district along with the Eastern region are Francistown, Selebi-Phikwe, Solomon's Wall, Lepokole Hills, Tswapong Hills, Moremi Gorge, Motlhabaneng Rock Paintings, Letsibogo Dam, Khama Rhino Sanctuary, Shoshong Hills, Khama III Memorial Museum, Supa Ngwao Museum, Khama Royal Residence and Cemetery and Mashatu Game Reserve.

Most part of Botswana has tableland slopes sliding from east to west. The region has an average elevation of around 915 m (3,002 ft) above the mean sea level. The vegetation type is Savannah, with tall grasses, bushes and trees. The annual precipitation is around 65 cm (26 in), most of which is received during the summer season from November to May. Most of the rivers in the region are seasonal, with Limpopo River, which are prone to flash floods, being the most prominent. There are conflicts between agricultural expansion and protection of indigenous wildlife within the Central District. There are several seasonal rivers in the district including the Boteti River and the Lepashe River, whose flows in the rainy season reach the Makgadikgadi Pans.

== Demographics ==
Historical population
Year	Pop.	±%
1981	358,024	—
1991	463,797	+29.5%
2001	563,260	+21.4%
2011	638,604	+13.4%
2022	706,135	+10.6%

As of 2011, the total population of the district was 576,064 compared to 501,381 in 2001. The growth rate of population during the decade was 1.40. The population in the district was 28.45 per cent of the total population in the country. The sex ratio stood at 94.01 for every 100 males, compared to 91.82 in 2001. The average house hold size was 3.37 in 2011 compared to 4.51 in 2001. There were 18,838 craft and related workers; 5,678 clerks; 35,256 people working in elementary occupation; 2,359 legislators, administrators and managers; 5,921 plant and machine operators and assemblers; 3,022 professionals; 12,864 service workers, shop and market sales workers; 9,019 skilled agricultural and related workers; and 7,325 technicians and associated professionals, making the total work force of 101,149.

== Education and economy ==
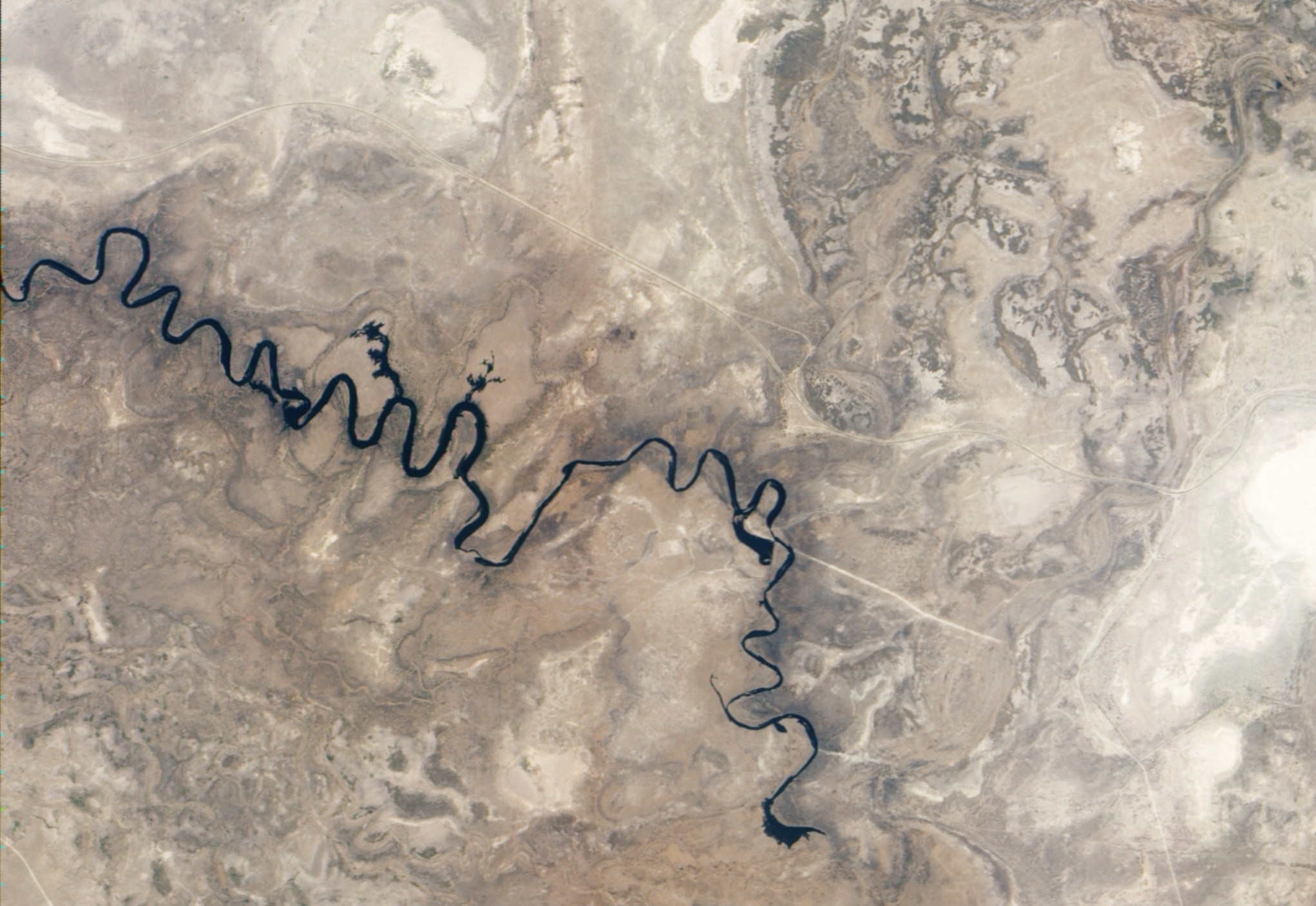
Aerial view of Boteti river

As of 2011, there were a total of 264 schools in the district, with 23.30 per cent private schools. The total number of students in the Council schools was 113,632, while it was 3,848 in private schools. The total number of students enrolled in the district was 117,480: 57,378 girls and 60,102 boys. The total number of qualified teachers was 4,585, 3,441 female and 1,144 male. There were around 132 temporary teachers, 69 male and 201 female. There were no untrained teachers in the district.

As of 2006, 80,594 were involved in agriculture, 8,423 in construction, 14,237 in education, 1,165 in electricity and water, 1,034 in finance, 49 in foreign mission, 4,396 in health, 4,218 in hotels and restaurants, 10,664 in manufacturing, 4,900 in mining and quarrying, 2,894 in other community services, 8,385 in private households, 16,022 in public administration, 4,489 in real estate, 3,927 in transport and communications, and 21,546 in wholesale and retail trade. The total number of workers was 186,943, 95,717 male and 91,221 female.

== Administration ==
Botswana gained independence from the British in 1966 and adapted the colonial administration framework to form its district administration. The policies were modified during 1970–74 to address some of the basic issues. The district is administered by a district administration and district council which are responsible for local administration. The policies for the administration are framed by the Ministry of Local Government. The major activities of the council are Tribal Administration, Remote Area Development and Local Governance. The executive powers of the council are vested on a commissioner appointed by the central government. Technical services wing of the Department of Local Government is responsible for developing roads, infrastructure in villages like water supply, schools and recreational facilities. All the staff of the local administration expect District Administration are selected via Unified Local Government Services (ULGS) and the Ministry of Local Government is responsible for their training, deployment and career development. The six sub-districts of Central District created as a part of National Development Park of the district are Bobonong, Boteti, Mahalapye, Orapa, Serowe Palapye and Tutume.

== Villages ==
- Gamabuo
- Kedia
- Khwee
- Kodibeleng
- Kudumatse
- Majwanaadipitse
- Makwate
- Malatswai
- Matlhako
- Matsitama
- Mmanxotae
- Mmeya
- Mogapi
- Mogapinyana
- Mogome
- Mokgenene
- Mokgware
- Mokoboxane
- Mokoswane
- Mokubilo
- Moreomabele
- Motshegaletau
- Mosolotshane
- Topisi
- Toromoja
- Tshokatshaa

== See also ==
- Sub-districts of Botswana
