= Phietswana =

Village in Southern District, Botswana

Coordinates: 25°02′26″S 25°14′11″E

Location of Phietswana

Phietswana is a small village in the Barolong sub-district of the Southern District, Botswana. The population was 682 per the 2011 census.
