= 1970s in Botswana =

The following lists events that happened during the 1970s in Botswana.

== Incumbents ==
- President: Seretse Khama (1966–1980)
- Vice President: Quett Masire (1966–1980)

== Events ==
=== 1970 ===
- The Botswana Development Corporation is established.
- Botswana establishes diplomatic relations with the Soviet Union.
- January – The power to allocate tribal land is transferred from the kgosis to independent land boards under the Tribal Land Act.
- 6 March – Botswana establishes diplomatic relations with Czechoslovakia.
- July – The Ministry of Finance and Development Planning is established.
- September – President Seretse goes to Lusaka to speak at the Non-Aligned Movement summit.

=== 1971 ===
- 1 July – The Orapa diamond mine is established.
- 1 September – Simon Hirshfeldt becomes the first Motswana police commissioner.

=== 1972 ===
- March – Botswana becomes financially independent from the United Kingdom.

=== 1973 ===
- 15 January – Botswana sends its first citizen to train in the diamond industry in the United Kingdom.
- 15 January – The Agricultural Resources (Conservation) Act is passed.

=== 1974 ===
- The Selebi-Phikwe mine opens.
- The Tribal Grazing Lands Policy is established.
- January – The Botswana Agricultural Market Board is established.
- March – Botswana ends its recognition of the Republic of China, instead recognizing the People's Republic of China.
- 26 October – The 1974 Botswana general election is held. The Botswana Democratic Party maintains its majority.

=== 1975 ===
- Botswana increases its governmental stake in Debswana to 50%.

=== 1976 ===
- Kimberlite diamonds are discovered in Jwaneng.
- July – Student protests in South Africa cause refugees to flee to Botswana.
- 26 July – President Khama visits China.
- 23 August – The Bank of Botswana is established. The Botswana pula replaces the South African rand as Botswana's official currency.

=== 1977 ===
- January – The United Nations passes a resolution demanding that Rhodesian forces end their hostilities along the Botswana–Rhodesia border.
- April – The pula is valued at 5% above the rand.
- 15 April – The Botswana Defence Force is established.
- 19 April – Mompati Merafhe and Ian Khama are appointed commander and deputy commander of the Botswana Defence Force, respectively.
- October – Four people are arrested as they travel through Botswana to serve in the military in Rhodesia.
- 4 October - A referendum on electoral reform was held.

=== 1978 ===
- Botswana Football Association is affiliated with FIFA (international governing body of association football).
- Medu Art Ensemble relocates to Gaborone, Botswana.
- 27 February – A skirmish at Leshoma sees fifteen soldiers of the Botswana Defence Force killed by Rhodesian soldiers.
- 29 March – Three suspected mercenaries from Rhodesia are killed in the Tuli Block.
- 11 September – The University of Botswana closes amid riots.

=== 1979 ===
- 13 April – The Gaborone–Francistown Highway is completed.
- 13 April – 14 members of the Zimbabwe African People's Union are kidnapped in Francistown by Rhodesian soldiers.
- July – Botswana co-founds the Southern African Development Coordination Conference.
- July – Queen Elizabeth II visits Gaborone and gives President Khama his second knighthood.
- 20 October – The 1979 Botswana general election is held. The Botswana Democratic Party maintains its majority.

== Births ==
- 1973
  - 2 March – Patrick Lebekwe, Botswana footballer
- 1976
  - 23 April – Phazha Butale, Botswana footballer
- 1977
  - 28 July – Anthony Matengu, Botswana footballer
- 1978
  - 23 August – Ditaola Ditaola, Botswana footballer
  - 19 September – Kabelo Kgosiang, Botswana footballer
  - 14 November – Odirile Gaolebale, retired Botswanan footballer
  - 29 December – Agisanyang Mosimanegape, Botswana former footballer

== Deaths ==
- 1970
  - 12 January – Russell England
- 1971
  - Leetile Disang Raditladi
- 1973
  - 20 August – Jules Ellenberger
- 1975
  - Benjamin Steinberg
- 1977
  - Motlatsi Segokgo
  - 16 May – Bakwana Kgosidintsi Kgari
- 1979
  - Ntebogang Ratshosa
  - 29 October – Philip Matante

== See also ==
- History of Botswana
- List of Botswana-related topics
- Outline of Botswana
- Timeline of Botswana
