= 1990s in Botswana =

The following lists events that happened during the 1990s in Botswana.

== Incumbents ==
- President:
  - Quett Masire (1980–1998)
  - Festus Mogae (1998–2008)
- Vice President
  - Peter Mmusi (1983–1992)
  - Festus Mogae (1992–1998)
  - Ian Khama (1998–2008)

== Events ==
=== 1990 ===
- Namibia is established as an independent country to the west of Botswana, giving the country another route to the ocean beside South Africa.

=== 1991 ===
- Sowa Soda Ash Works is established.
- 12,000 public sector employees are removed from their positions for engaging in strike action.
- Apartheid in neighbouring South Africa ends.

=== 1992 ===
- March – Peter Mmusi steps down as vice president amid scandal. He is replaced by Festus Mogae.
- 3 July – A ruling is made in favour of Unity Dow in Attorney General of Botswana v. Unity Dow.

=== 1993 ===
- The Pula Fund, a sovereign wealth fund, is established.
- The human rights group Ditshwanelo is founded.

=== 1994 ===
- 11 July – The Directorate on Corruption and Economic Crime is established following several corruption scandals.
- 15 October – The 1994 Botswana general election is held. The Botswana Democratic Party maintains its majority.
- 6 November – The murder of Segametsi Mogomotsi as part of a ritual killing prompts riots.

=== 1995 ===
- 16 February – The parliament building and downtown Gaborone are attacked by students.

=== 1996 ===
- Universal pensions are established.

=== 1997 ===
- The Vision 2016 economic plan is launched.
- Botho University is founded.
- April – Omang national identity cards are introduced.
- October – A referendum is held to create the Independent Electoral Commission, to lower the voting age to 18, to set term limits on the presidency, and to allow automatic succession of the vice president in the event of a presidential vacancy. All three motions pass.

=== 1998 ===
- 31 March – President Quett Masire retires. He is succeeded by Festus Mogae.
- 20 June – The Botswana Congress Party is founded by Michael Dingake.
- 13 July – Ian Khama becomes vice president.
- September – Botswana joins South Africa in an invasion of Lesotho to quell a military insurrection.
- The LGBT rights group LEGABIBO is founded.

=== 1999 ===
- 17 May – Yarona FM becomes the first private radio station in Botswana.
- September – A state of emergency is declared for six days following issues with voter registration.
- 16 October – The 1999 Botswana general election is held. The Botswana Democratic Party maintains its majority. The Botswana Congress Party had acquired seats from members that left the Botswana National Front, but it loses most of these seats.
- 13 December – The International Court of Justice rules that Botswana, not Namibia, has jurisdiction over Sedudu Island.

== Deaths ==
- 1990
  - James G. Haskins, Speaker of the National Assembly
  - 3 October – Bathoen Gaseitsiwe, kgosi of Bangwaketse and Leader of the Opposition
- 1991
  - Amos Dambe, politician and diplomat
- 1992
  - Englishman Kgabo, politician
  - Gaefalale Sebeso, Deputy Speaker of the National Assembly
- 1994
  - Elizabeth Pulane Moremi, regent of BaTawana
  - 1 October – Peter Mmusi, vice-president of Botswana
- 1996
  - John Hardbattle, activist
- 1999
  - 8 October – Alfred Merriweather, Speaker of the National Assembly

== See also ==
- History of Botswana
- List of Botswana-related topics
- Outline of Botswana
- Timeline of Botswana
