= 1980s in Botswana =

The following lists events that happened during the 1980s in Botswana.

== Incumbents ==
- President:
  - Seretse Khama (1966–1980)
  - Quett Masire (1980–1998)
- Vice President
  - Quett Masire (1966–1980)
  - Lenyeletse Seretse (1980–1983)
  - Peter Mmusi (1983–1992)

== Events ==
=== 1980 ===
- Botswana co-founds the Southern African Development Coordination Conference.
- 13 July – President Seretse Khama dies. He is succeeded by Quett Masire.

=== 1981 ===
- A drought in Southern Africa begins, destroying approximately 75% of crops in Botswana. It will continue until 1987.

=== 1982 ===
- The Financial Assistance Policy is implemented to provide grants for businesses.
- Botswana National Museum hosts Culture & Resistance Conference, 5–9 July 1982.
- February – The Jwaneng diamond mine is established.
- June – The Botswana Progressive Union is founded.
- September – The University of Botswana is founded.

=== 1983 ===
- 3 January – Vice President Lenyeletse Seretse dies. Peter Mmusi becomes vice president.
- A labour law is passed limiting the right to unionise.

=== 1984 ===
- The Sir Seretse Khama International Airport opens.
- May – The Public Service Act allows civil servants to operate in the private sector.
- 8 September – The 1984 Botswana general election is held. The Botswana Democratic Party maintains its majority.

=== 1985 ===
- 1985 – HIV is first identified in Botswana, beginning the nation's HIV epidemic.
- 14 June – South African soldiers invade Botswana and attack the headquarters of a South African anti-apartheid group in Gabarone. 12 people are killed, and the action is condemned in a resolution by the United Nations.

=== 1986 ===
- 17 April – Botswana's first women's rights group, Emang Basadi, is established.

=== 1987 ===
- A referendum is held to form a Supervisor of Elections. It passes with 78.1% of the vote.
- The university is closed for several months in response to student protests against police misconduct.
- May – Morupule Electric Power Station is established.
- 1 October – Botswana Railways is established.
- November – The constitution is amended so that only citizens of Botswana can serve as president.

=== 1989 ===
- Free secondary education is made available in Botswana.
- 7 October – The 1989 Botswana general election is held. The Botswana Democratic Party maintains its majority.

== Deaths ==
- 1980
  - 13 July – Seretse Khama, President of Botswana
- 1982
  - Benjamin Thema, Minister of Education
  - 16 September – Keoagetse Radipotsane, Batswana football player
- 1983
  - 3 January – Lenyeletse Seretse, vice-president of Botswana
- 1986
  - Archelaus Tsoebebe, Minister of Labour and Social Services
  - 17 April – Bessie Head, writer

== See also ==
- History of Botswana
- List of Botswana-related topics
- Outline of Botswana
- Timeline of Botswana
