= 1960s in Botswana =

The following lists events that happened during the 1960s in Botswana, beginning with its independence on 30 September 1966.

== Incumbents ==
- President: Seretse Khama (1966–1980)
- Vice President: Quett Masire (1966–1980)

== Events ==
=== 1966 ===
- The Botswana National Stadium opens.
- 30 September – The Bechuanaland Protectorate is granted independence as Botswana. Seretse Khama is chosen as the first president of Botswana by the National Assembly.
- 17 October – Botswana is admitted to the United Nations.
- November – The Zambia high commission opens in Gaborone.

=== 1967 ===
- 1 April – The United Kingdom offers Botswana 13 million pounds in foreign aid.
- July – Diamonds are discovered in Orapa.
- July – The Bushmen Protection Bill is passed.
- August – President Khama visits Zambia.
- 29 September – The Mineral Rights in Tribal Territories Act and the Mines and Minerals Act grant the government control over mining.
- 19 October – Botswana's High Commission for East Africa in Nairobi is opened by Richard N. Mannathoko.

=== 1968 ===
- 21 May – Zambian President Kenneth Kaunda visits Botswana.
- 27 June – The Botswana–South Africa border is defined by the border established in 1884.
- July – The Tribal Land Act is passed, moving power over land allocation from the kgosis to land boards.

=== 1969 ===
- 13 June – Bathoen II leaves the Botswana Democratic Party and resigns his status as kgosi of the Ngwaketse to join the Botswana National Front.
- 23 June – The Debswana mining company is established.
- 18 October – The first national election of Botswana is held. The Botswana Democratic Party is challenged by the Botswana National Front but maintains its majority.
- December – Selebi-Phikwe is founded.

== Deaths ==
- 1969 – Tsheko Tsheko

== See also ==
- History of Botswana
- List of Botswana-related topics
- Outline of Botswana
- Timeline of Botswana
