= Kabelo Moshaoa =

Motswana footballer

Personal information
- Full name: Kabelo Moshaoa
- Place of birth: Botswana
- Position: Midfielder

Team information
- Current team: Boteti Young Fighters

Senior career*
Years	Team	Apps	(Gls)
2000–2005	Mokgosi Young Fighters		
2005–	Boteti Young Fighters		

International career
2001	Botswana	1	(0)
- * Club domestic league appearances and goals

Kabelo Moshaoa is a Motswana footballer. He currently plays as a midfielder for the Boteti Young Fighters. He also won one cap for the Botswana national football team in 2001.

== See also ==
- Football in Botswana
