= Patrick Lebekwe =

Motswana footballer

Personal information
- Full name: Patrick Lebekwe
- Date of birth: 2 March 1973 (age 53)
- Place of birth: Botswana
- Position: Defender

Senior career*
Years	Team	Apps	(Gls)
2000–2007	Police XI		

International career
2001	Botswana	1	(0)
- * Club domestic league appearances and goals

Patrick Lebekwe (born 2 March 1973) is a Motswana former footballer who played as a defender. In 2001, he played one match for the Botswana national football team.

== See also ==
- Football in Botswana
