= Bibliography of Botswana =

The bibliography of Botswana is a list of major publications about the Republic of Botswana and the history of its territory prior to statehood.

== History ==
- Chirenje, J. Mutero (1977). A History of Northern Botswana, 1850-1910. Fairleigh Dickinson University Press. ISBN 978-0-8386-1537-9.
- Morton, Fred; Ramsay, Jeff (2018). Historical Dictionary of Botswana (Fifth ed.). Rowman and Littlefield. ISBN 978-1-5381-1133-8.
- Schapera, Isaac; Comaroff, John L. (1991) [1953]. The Tswana. Kegan Paul International. ISBN 978-0-7103-0421-6.
- Stevens, Richard P. (1975). Historical Dictionary of the Republic of Botswana. Scarecrow Press. ISBN 978-0-8108-0857-7.
- Tlou, Thomas; Campbell, Alec C. (1984). History of Botswana. Macmillan Botswana. ISBN 978-0-333-36531-1.

=== Economic history ===
- Hillbom, Ellen; Bolt, Jutta (2018). Botswana – A Modern Economic History. Palgrave Macmillan. doi:10.1007/978-3-319-73144-5. ISBN 978-3-319-73144-5.
- Leith, James Clark (2005). Why Botswana Prospered. McGill-Queen's University Press. ISBN 978-0-7735-2821-5.
- Schapera, Ian (1947). Migrant Labour and Tribal Life: A Study of Conditions in the Bechuanaland Protectorate. Oxford University Press. OCLC 1148929.

=== Military history ===
- Henk, Dan (2007). The Botswana Defense Force in the Struggle for an African Environment. Palgrave Macmillan. ISBN 978-0-230-61044-6.
- Jackson, Ashley (1999). Botswana, 1939-1945: An African Country at War. Clarendon Press. ISBN 978-0-19-820764-1.

=== Political history ===
- Crowder, Michael (1988). The Flogging of Phinehad McIntosh. Yale University Press. ISBN 978-0-300-04098-2.
- Dale, Richard (1995). Botswana's Search for Autonomy in Southern Africa. Bloomsbury Academic. ISBN 978-0-313-29571-3.
- Fawcus, Peter; Tilbury, Alan (2000). Botswana: The Road to Independence. Pula Press. ISBN 978-99912-61-68-3.
- Gulbrandsen, Ørnulf (2012). The State and the Social: State Formation in Botswana and its Precolonial and Colonial Genealogies. Berghahn Books. ISBN 978-0-85745-298-6.
- Lekorwe, Mogopodi H. (1998). Botswana, Politics and Society. J.L. van Schaik. ISBN 978-0-627-02231-9.
- Makgala, Christian John (2006). Elite Conflict in Botswana: A History. Africa Institute of South Africa. ISBN 978-0-7983-0192-3.
- Morton, Fred; Ramsay, Jeff, eds. (1987). The Birth of Botswana: A History of the Bechuanaland Protectorate from 1910 to 1966. Longman Botswana. ISBN 978-0-582-00584-6.
- Munger, Edwin S. (1965). Bechuanaland: Pan-African Outpost Or Bantu Homeland?. Oxford University Press.
- Parson, Jack (1990). Succession to High Office in Botswana: Three Case Studies. Ohio University Center for International Studies. ISBN 978-0-89680-157-8.
- Picard, Louis A. (1987). The Politics of Development in Botswana: A Model for Success?. Lynne Rienner Publishers. ISBN 978-0-931477-95-9.
- Throup, David W (2011). Botswana: Assessing Risks to Stability. Center for Strategic and International Studies. ISBN 978-0-89206-635-3.
- Samatar, Abdi Ismail (1999). An African Miracle: State and Class Leadership and Colonial Legacy in Botswana Development. Heinemann. ISBN 978-0-325-00068-8.
- Sillery, Anthony (2023) [1974]. Botswana: A Short Political History. Taylor & Francis. ISBN 978-1-003-80411-6.
- Stedman, Stephen John, ed. (2023) [1993]. Botswana: The Political Economy of Democratic Development. Lynne Rienner Publishers. ISBN 978-1-68585-638-0.
- Vaughan, Olufemi (2003). Chiefs, Power, and Social Change: Chiefship and Modern Politics in Botswana, 1880s–1990s. Africa World Press. ISBN 978-1-59221-094-7.
- Wylie, Diana (1990). A Little God: The Twilight of Patriarchy in a Southern African Chiefdom. Wesleyan University Press. ISBN 978-0-8195-5228-0.

=== Prehistory ===
- Campbell, Alec C. (2010). Tsodilo Hills: Copper Bracelet of the Kalahari. Michigan State University Press. ISBN 978-0-87013-858-4.
- Wilmsen, Edwin N. (1989). Land Filled with Flies: A Political Economy of the Kalahari. University of Chicago Press. ISBN 978-0-226-90015-5.

== Geography ==
- Eckardt, Frank D., ed. (2022). Landscapes and Landforms of Botswana. World Geomorphological Landscapes. Springer. ISBN 978-3-030-86102-5.

=== Wildlife ===
- Newman, Kenneth (1989). Newman's Birds of Botswana. Southern Book Publishers. ISBN 978-1-86812-194-6.

== Politics ==
- Good, Kenneth (2003). Bushmen and Diamonds: (un)civil Society in Botswana. Nordic Africa Institute. ISBN 978-91-7106-520-9.
- Good, Kenneth (2008). Diamonds, Dispossession & Democracy in Botswana. African Issues. James Currey. ISBN 978-1-84701-313-2. OCLC 181927845.
- Jalata, Asafa (2019). Cultural Capital and Prospects for Democracy in Botswana and Ethiopia. Routledge. ISBN 978-1-000-00856-2.
- Alexander, Karin; Kaboyakgosi, Gape (2012). A Fine Balance: Assessing the Quality of Governance in Botswana. African Books Collective. ISBN 978-1-920409-85-2.
- Maundeni, Zibani (2004). Civil Society, Politics and the State in Botswana. University of Michigan. ISBN 978-99912-1-412-2.
- Peters, Pauline E. (1994). Dividing the Commons: Politics, Policy, and Culture in Botswana. University of Virginia Press. ISBN 978-0-8139-1551-7.
- Hope (Sr.), Kempe Ronald; Somolekae, Gloria (1998). Public Administration and Policy in Botswana. Juta and Company. ISBN 978-0-7021-4789-0.

== Demographics ==
- Seth, Willie (2009). Botswana and Its People. New Africa Press. ISBN 978-0-9814258-7-0.

=== Education ===
- Burchfield, Shirley A., ed. (1994). Research for Educational Policy and Planning in Botswana. Macmillan Botswana. ISBN 978-99912-78-14-8.
- Mgadla, Part Themba (2003). A History of Education in the Bechuanaland Protectorate to 1965. University Press of America. ISBN 978-0-7618-2488-6.

=== Health ===
- Dow, Unity; Essex, Max (2010). Saturday Is for Funerals. Harvard University Press. ISBN 978-0-674-05077-8.
- Livingston, Julie (2005). Debility and the Moral Imagination in Botswana. Indiana University Press. ISBN 978-0-253-11149-4.

== Culture ==
- Denbow, James R.; Thebe, Phenyo C. (2006). Culture and Customs of Botswana. Greenwood Press. ISBN 978-0-313-33178-7. OCLC 62118271.
