= Phazha Butale =

Motswana footballer

Personal information
- Full name: Phazha Butale
- Date of birth: 23 April 1976 (age 50)
- Place of birth: Botswana
- Position: Midfielder

Senior career*
Years	Team	Apps	(Gls)
2002–	Notwane FC		

International career
2003–2004	Botswana	7	(0)
- * Club domestic league appearances and goals

Phazha Butale (born 23 April 1976) is a Motswana former footballer. He won seven caps for the Botswana national football team between 2003 and 2004.

== See also ==
- Football in Botswana
