= 2006 in Botswana =

- Decades: 1980s; 1990s; 2000s; 2010s; 2020s
- See also: Other events of 2006; Timeline of Botswana history

The following lists events that happened during 2006 in Botswana.

== Incumbents ==
- President: Festus Mogae
- Vice President: Ian Khama

== Events ==
=== December ===
- December 13 - The High Court of Botswana rules that thousands of Bushmen should not have been evicted from their ancestral home which is now the Central Botswana Game Reserve.
