= Kabelo Kgosiang =

Motswana footballer

Personal information
- Full name: Kabelo Kgosiang
- Date of birth: 10 September 1973 (age 53)
- Place of birth: Botswana
- Position: Midfielder

Senior career*
| Years | Team | Apps | (Gls) |
| 2000– | Prisons XI | | |

International career
| 1999–2004 | Botswana | 12 | (0) |
- * Club domestic league appearances and goals

Kabelo Kgosiang (born 19 September 1978) is a Motswana footballer who plays as a midfielder for Prisons XI. He played for the Botswana national football team between 1999 and 2004.

== See also ==
- Football in Botswana
