= Ngwapa =

Village in Botswana

Coordinates: 23°00′29″S 27°45′00″E

Location of Ngwapa

Ngwapa is a village in Central District of Botswana. The village is located approximately 13 km (8.1 mi) from the Limpopo River and the border with South Africa. In the 2022 census, Ngwapa's population was 579.
