= Anthony Matengu =

Motswana footballer

Personal information
- Date of birth: 28 July 1977 (age 49)
- Place of birth: Botswana
- Position: Goalkeeper

Senior career*
Years	Team	Apps	(Gls)
2000–2006	Police XI		
2006–	Botswana Meat Commission		

International career
2001	Botswana	1	(0)
- * Club domestic league appearances and goals

Anthony Matengu (born 28 July 1977) is a Motswana footballer who plays as a goalkeeper for Botswana Meat Commission FC. He won his only cap for the Botswana national football team in 2001.
