= History of Botswana =

The history of Botswana encompasses the region's ancient and tribal history, its colonisation as the Bechuanaland Protectorate, and the present-day Republic of Botswana. The first modern humans to inhabit Botswana were the San people, and agriculture first developed approximately 2,300 years ago. The first Bantu peoples arrived c. 200 AD, and the first Tswana people arrived about 200 years later. The Tswana people split into various tribes over the following thousand years as migrations within the region continued, culminating in the Difaqane in the late 18th century. European contact first occurred in 1816, which led to the Christianization of the region.

Facing threats from German South West Africa and the Afrikaners, the most influential Tswana chiefs negotiated the creation of a protectorate under the United Kingdom in 1885. The British divided the territory into tribal reserves for each of the major chiefs to rule, giving the chiefs more power than they had previously, but it otherwise exercised only limited direct control over the protectorate. The British government took a more active role beginning in the 1930s. Botswana supported British involvement in World War II and many fought as part of the African Auxiliary Pioneer Corps.

A power struggle took place in the 1950s between the Ngwato chief Seretse Khama and his regent Tshekedi Khama. Seretse's marriage to a white woman, Ruth Williams Khama, led the British to ban him from the protectorate. He returned in 1956 with popular support, and tribes moved toward elected government as an independence movement formed. A national legislature was created in 1961, and political parties were formed. Seretse became the leader of the Bechuanaland Democratic Party, which was endorsed by the British government to lead post-independence, and it saw overwhelming support in the first election in 1965. The Republic of Botswana was granted full independence in 1966.

With a strong mandate, Seretse and his party implemented liberal democracy and began developing infrastructure in what was one of the world's poorest nations. Extensive diamond deposits were discovered in 1969, causing a massive reorganisation of Botswana's economy. The Debswana mining company was created in 1978, and Botswana became the world's fastest growing economy. The HIV/AIDS pandemic became a crisis in Botswana in the 1980s, and the 1990s came with the introduction of political factionalism after the political scandal of the Kgabo Commission. The Botswana Democratic Party remained the dominant party from independence until the Umbrella for Democratic Change won the 2024 general election.

== Pre-colonial history ==
=== Prehistory and early history ===
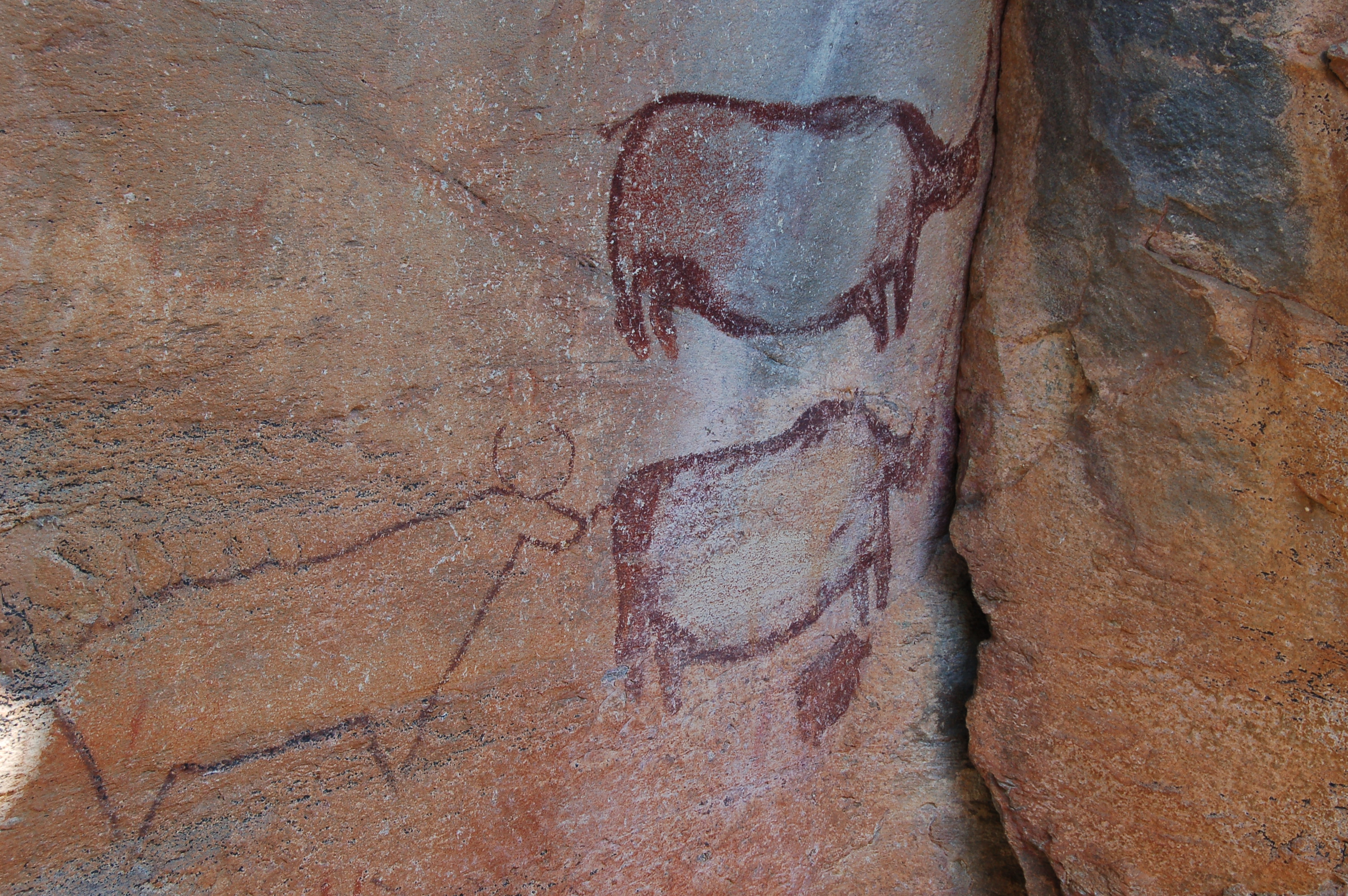
Prehistoric cave paintings at Tsodilo

Present-day Botswana was primarily forest ten million years ago, and the rivers were much larger than they are in the present, flowing into a massive paleolake, Lake Makgadikgadi. Homo erectus lived in the region during the Early Stone Age. Stone tools in present-day Botswana, such as Acheulean axes, date back to two million years ago. Hominin migration to the Kalahari Desert is estimated to have happened prior to Marine Isotope Stage 6, 186,000 years ago. Lake Makgadikgadi began to shrink approximately 50,000 years ago.

The ancestors of the Khoe and San peoples—unrelated peoples who are referred to collectively as the Khoisan or Sarwa peoples—lived in present-day Botswana by approximately 40,000 to 30,000 years ago. They may have been the first humans to enter the Late Stone Age. They established themselves around rivers during drier periods of history but spread throughout the region during wetter periods. They are known to have inhabited the areas around Lake Makgadikgadi, as well as Tsodilo and ≠Gi. Other peoples such as the Nata, Shua, and Xani are believed to have arrived after the Khoe and San. Rock art dates back to approximately 30,000 years ago, Mining of specularite and hematite began around this time to create paints. Virtually all permanent bodies of water were associated with early human populations by 20,000 years ago. More detailed study of southern Africa in the Stone Age has been limited.

The various peoples of the region were hunter-gatherers who remained in small groups and engaged in trade with one another. It is believed that each group was a collection of related families holding a specific territory, led by the eldest man of the group's head family. Men hunted large animals, while women gathered plants and caught small animals. The groups intermarried and practiced a dowry system, xaro.

Approximately 2,000 years ago, the peoples of the region brought cattle and sheep to present-day Botswana and began making pottery. Agriculture developed during this time and the peoples began settling in villages, which rose and fell as the climate and cattle raids caused livestock access to fluctuate. Among the earliest crops were pearl millet, finger millet, sorghum, Bambara groundnuts, cowpeas, and cucurbits.

The first Bantu people migrated to the region between 2,000 and 1,500 years ago, and it was once believed that they were the ones who had first introduced livestock to the area. The Kalanga people were the first of the Bantu peoples to settle in present-day Botswana, arriving c. 200 CE. The ancestors of the first Tswana people (singular Motswana, plural Batswana) are estimated to have arrived c. 400 CE. These Bantu peoples brought iron and copper tools to the region and settled along permanent waterways. They built permanent settlements of about 10–15 pole-and-daga houses each, rather than the temporary structures of the more nomadic Khoisan. The Khoisan and the Bantu likely traded and intermarried during this period.

=== 7th century through 14th century ===
A group of Zhizo people, the Taukome people, arrived in present-day Botswana by the 7th century and settled between the Shashe River and the Serorome River. Their possession of glass beads indicates early connection to Indian Ocean trade. The number of livestock kept in present-day Botswana increased significantly between the 8th century and the 10th century. The Tswana people organised themselves into a type of tribal government, called a morafe (plural merafe), each led by a chief called a kgosi (plural dikgosi). This system produced a more hierarchical government relative to others in the region. Cattle became a central part of society in the region, and ownership of cattle denoted one's status. The early history of the Tswana people remains largely unknown because little archaeological evidence has been left.

Trade routes connected tribes throughout the Kalahari Desert by 900 CE, and a series of routes were created across the entire region over the following century, culminating at the Indian Ocean. Some of the Eiland people migrated from present-day South Africa into present-day Botswana in the mid-10th century. The Toutswe people, another of the Zhizo people, migrated to present-day Botswana during the 11th century and became the strongest group in the region, deriving their wealth from ownership of cattle. Three Toutswe villages were constructed at Bosutswe, Sung, and Toutswemogala, each ruling over smaller villages surrounding them. By the 12th century, the Toutswe had spread to the Kalahari Desert.

The value of products fluctuated as expanding trade with foreign nations and the discovery of gold occurred, reducing interest in specularite and animal products like ivory. One tribe in Tsodilo was particularly influential in the trade of specularite until it fell at the end of the 12th century. The tribes in southeastern Botswana were far removed from these developments and remained largely unaffected.

Neighbouring present-day Botswana during the 11th and 12th centuries were the people of Leopard's Kopje to the east. First established in Bambandyanalo, they became major figures in regional trade and moved to Mapungubwe by the late-11th century where they formed the Kingdom of Mapungubwe. They projected influence across the region through the 12th century. The peoples of the Okavango Delta and later the peoples of the Tsodilo Hills were forced to abandon their settlements during this time, which may have been because they were cut off from major trade routes. Only the Khoe people stayed in the area. Mapungubwe fell by the 13th century, and the Toutswe villages, cut off from trade, fell around the same time. The Mambo people lived around present-day Francistown and became influential around this time. The modern Tswana, Khalagari, and Sotho peoples began to form in Transvaal around the 12th century. The Khalagari migrated west to what is now southeastern Botswana. The Fokeng people also appeared to the west in the 12th century, and the Moloko people appeared by the 13th century. The original Tswana tribe, the Phofu dynasty, was created in Transvaal in the 13th century by Mogale. Over the following centuries, it split into several Tswana peoples, including the Hurutshe, Kwena, Ngwaketse, Ngwato, Tlharo, and Kgatla peoples.

The Kingdom of Zimbabwe emerged and replaced Mapungubwe as the regional power in the 13th century when the Gumanye people gained influence in the city of Great Zimbabwe, which was able to control trade more closely with its valuable land and resources and its closer proximity to the coast. Zimbabwe controlled many of the tribes that existed in what is now northeastern Botswana, and the gold trade became a driving factor in the region's economy. Zimbabwe was losing influence by the end of the 14th century, and it fell in the mid-15th century. Several other states developed after its fall. The Kingdom of Butua, formed by the Kalanga peoples, took Zimbabwe's place on the present-day Botswana–Zimbabwe border.

The Tswana and Pedi peoples followed the Khalagari people west around the late 14th century, and the Rolong people separated under the rule of Morolong. The chief Masilo is said to have ruled all of the western Tswana peoples at this time, until the Tlharo people separated from his domain. The area is then said to have been ruled by Malope at the end of the 15th century.

=== 15th century through 18th century ===
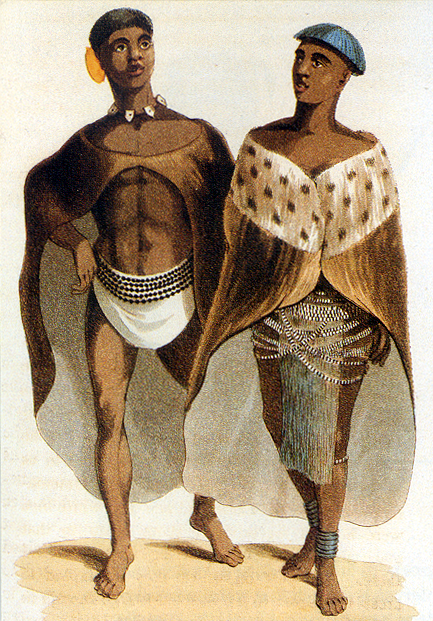
An illustration of a Tswana man and his wife in the early 1800s

Tswana peoples migrated internally through present-day Botswana as they were displaced by native and colonial populations from the south, and they had a presence throughout present-day Botswana by 1600. The original Tswana tribe, the Phofu dynasty, declined in the late-15th century. Large migrations of Kalanga and Sotho–Tswana peoples took place in the 15th and 16th centuries. The Kalanga peoples controlled the land between the Motloutse River and the Makgadikgadi Pan until the 18th century. The Hurutshe, Kgatla, and Kwena peoples split from the Phofu dynasty in the Transvaal region amid drought and hereditary conflicts, eventually migrating north to present-day Botswana. The Ngwaketse and Ngwato peoples in turn split from the Kwena around 1530. Some peoples of the region remained in the Late Stone Age until around the 16th century.

The peoples of present-day Botswana had established long travel routes by the end of the 17th century, travelling hundreds of kilometres for trade, hunting, and social purposes. Tribes were able to easily separate and form independently from one another because the region's primary asset, cattle, is easily transported. The western tribes were especially prone to separation because of the large distances between towns and farmlands. Splits between the Tswana groups took place through the 17th century, defining the modern tribes. The western Tswana tribes were often the targets of raids by the Griqua people. As Tswana peoples moved north to present-day southeastern Botswana in the 17th century, they settled lands occupied by Khalagari peoples, assimilating or displacing them. The Kwena people and their offshoot tribes migrated to present-day Botswana under the rule of Kgabo II and settled near Molepolole. According to oral tradition, the pastoralist Herero and Mbanderu peoples split from the Mbunda people in the 17th century as Tswana cattle raids scattered the groups, and the Yeyi people migrated from the upper Chobe River into the Okavango Delta in the 18th century. In other places, the Kaa people split from the Rolong people and the Khurutshe people split from the Bahurutshe people, with both groups migrating northward. The Bashaga people integrated into the Khalagari peoples in the late-18th century.

The first Tswana state was formed by the Ngwaketse people in the mid-18th century. Subsequent Tswana states were formed by the Kwena people, the Ngwato people, and the Tawana people over the following decades. With these came the development of the mophato (plural mephato), a militia regiment organised by age group, among the eastern Tswana peoples in the 1750s. Two Kgatla peoples, the Kgafela people and the Tlokwa people, joined at this time and seized control over the area surrounding Pilanesberg in present-day South Africa. They subjugated several peoples in the region and twice won conflicts against the Fokeng people. The use of mephato spread to the western Tswana peoples by the end of the century. It was never widely adopted in the south.

=== The Difaqane ===
The Difaqane, a period of conflict and displacement in southern Africa, took place during the late 18th and early 19th centuries. During this time, the Tswana people were subject to raids by many groups, including the Ndebele, the Kololo, the Ngoni, the Pedi, and the Voortrekkers. Most Tswana groups opted to retreat instead of fight. This triggered extensive migration across the region, causing the Tswana tribes to more thoroughly spread and establish a stronger presence throughout the territory of present-day Botswana. They settled primarily in the hardveld that makes up the eastern region of present-day Botswana. The Kwena and Ngwaketse peoples migrated from Transvaal to the sandveld. The first of the Kgatla peoples to settle in present-day Botswana, the Mmanaana people, migrated from South Africa in the early 19th century before settling in Moshupa and Thamaga. Only some of the northwestern Tswana peoples were spared displacement or interruption.

The Kololo people attacked the northwestern Tswana peoples in 1826, forcing the Kwena and Ngwaketse from their respective territories. Sebogo, the regent of the Ngwaketse tribe, raised 4,000 men in their mephato and surrounded Dithubaruba where the Kololo were residing. Killing the warriors and the civilians, they permanently expelled the Kololo from the region.

The tribes reestablished their states in the 1840s, founding several towns and villages of varying sizes. Governance was based around the kgotla, a deliberative forum in which the chief or a regional leader heard the concerns of most male citizens before making decisions. By 1880, the Tswana and Khalagari peoples had colonised all of present-day Botswana.

=== European missionaries ===
European missionaries first arrived in present-day Botswana in 1816 through the London Missionary Society. This and other missionary groups worked to convert the chiefs to Christianity and to build missionary schools. The missionary Robert Moffat set his mission station on the border of present-day Botswana as a barrier against the Boers so they could not move further inward. Moffat published the first Setswana language text with a uniform orthography when he began translating Christian texts and wrote a Setswana dictionary. Both the Old and New Testaments could be read in Setswana by 1857.

The 19th century Tswana people used several economic ideas that were rare in southern Africa, including credit, service contracts, and the mafisa system of the rich loaning cattle to the poor in exchange for labour. They also had a conception of private property by the mid-19th century, and both married men and married women were entitled to land rights. The men typically herded cattle while the women grew crops. Sorghum was the region's most commonly grown crop in the 19th century. Land was widely available, but droughts meant that farming was inconsistent.

British traders arrived in the 1830s and engaged in transactions with the chiefs. The influx of European settlers nearby allowed the Tswana tribes to incorporate themselves into the global economy. Chief Sechele I of the Kwena people took advantage of the new trading routes, securing control of British trade for his tribe. The Scottish missionary David Livingstone arrived in Botswana in 1845, where he established the Kolobeng Mission. This was the beginning of heavier European involvement in the Tswana tribes as they established intercontinental trade routes. Westernised fashion was adopted in urban areas through the rest of the century and combined with traditional clothing. In another effort to thwart the Boers, Livingstone provided firearms to the Kwena people. Sechele was the first person who Livingstone converted to Christianity, and the chief subsequently offered to convert his head men using rhinoceros-hide whips.

The Butua kingdom of the Kalanga peoples fell in 1840.

The Tswana peoples faced conflict from other groups in the region, peaking in the 1850s. Many Batswana, particularly the Kwena and Ngwato tribes, fought against Afrikaners and Zulu tribes in the eastern Kalahari Desert. The Kwena and the Mmanaana fought against Boers from Transvaal in 1852, defending their territory and ending the nation's westward expansion. The Batswana saw missionary groups as a means of refuge from invaders, incentivising conversion to Christianity. Sechele requested a British protectorate in 1853 to end regional conflicts, but he was denied.

European visitors became more common in the mid-19th century as hunters, explorers, and traders sought profit and adventure in the region. Many wrote travel books about the area, which were some of the only non-academic publications about present-day Botswana at the time. By the 1860s, migration out of the region increased as Batswana men travelled to work in South African mines. The discovery of the Tati Goldfields triggered the first European gold rush of Southern Africa in 1868. An early mining camp established in the 1870s expanded greatly as it became a major railway hub between Cape Province and Bulawayo, becoming Botswana's first major city, Francistown. At this point in Botswana's history, the major chiefs were all Christian. A war broke out between the Kwena and the Kgafela in 1875. By the end of the decade, chief Khama III of the Ngwato people seized control of British trade from the Kwena people.

== Bechuanaland Protectorate ==
=== Formation of the protectorate ===
The United Kingdom feared increasing German influence in the region, and it agreed to form the Bechuanaland Protectorate. The British wished to preserve its influence over the Tswana tribes, as they provided a connection between southern and central Africa. Tswana chiefs feared encroachment by German South West Africa and the Afrikaners, and they believed that the alternative to British control was settler colonialism by Germany. They also wished to avoid falling under the control of South Africa or mining magnate Cecil Rhodes, though the protectorate still found itself dependent on South Africa economically.

The region was divided into tribal land ruled by the chiefs and crown land controlled by the United Kingdom. Eight tribes were recognised by the British upon the creation of the protectorate. The largest four were given tribal reserves: the Kwena, the Ngwaketse, the Ngwato, and the Tawana. Three smaller ones were also recognised: the Kgatla, the Tlokwa, and the Malete. The eighth, the Tshidi, were given a reserve crossing the border between the protectorate and South Africa. While members of non-Tswana minorities were allowed to participate in Tswana society and governance, they were given no tribal reserves of their own. The introduction of tribal reserves altered the nature of Tswana governance, as tribes had previously been less defined and subject to expansion or shifting. With territories divided into tribal jurisdictions, residents were no longer able to easily leave a tribe. The protectorate initially extended to the Ngwato, reaching from 22 degrees south to the Molopo River, but it was extended to 18 degrees south to reach the Chobe River in 1890. This provided the British more labourers under its jurisdiction and created a larger barrier to limit German colonisation. Other Tswana peoples lived to the south of the protectorate and were later absorbed into South Africa.

The Kgafela people settled in Mochudi in 1887. This Kgatla group quickly became influential in the region and its name became synonymous with Kgatla. British soldiers led by Charles Warren arrived in 1891 to formally establish the protectorate. Its government was defined, and a commissioner was appointed as its head. The commissioner was given broad powers over the protectorate, so long as he respected previously established tribal law. Its capital was the South African city of Vryburg, meaning that the colonial rulers did not reside in the protectorate and had little direct involvement in its affairs. Instead, the high commissioner operated through two assistant commissioners, and a district commissioner facilitated contact with the various tribes. The centralisation of British rule in South Africa meant that the Bechuanaland Protectorate was economically dependent on it.

The British government believed the Bechuanaland Protectorate to be only a temporary entity and expected that it would soon be absorbed by a British colony. In the meantime, it believed that a self-sufficient protectorate would cost less to maintain. For these reasons, the colonial administration imposed very little direct control of the Bechuanaland Protectorate. The chiefs benefited from these affairs and were able to empower and enrich themselves; they retained broad autonomy, but colonial backing meant that they no longer needed the consent of the tribes to maintain rule. Tribal rule became autocratic, which led to human rights abuses and discrimination against women and ethnic minorities.

=== Early years of the protectorate ===
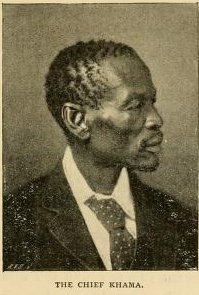
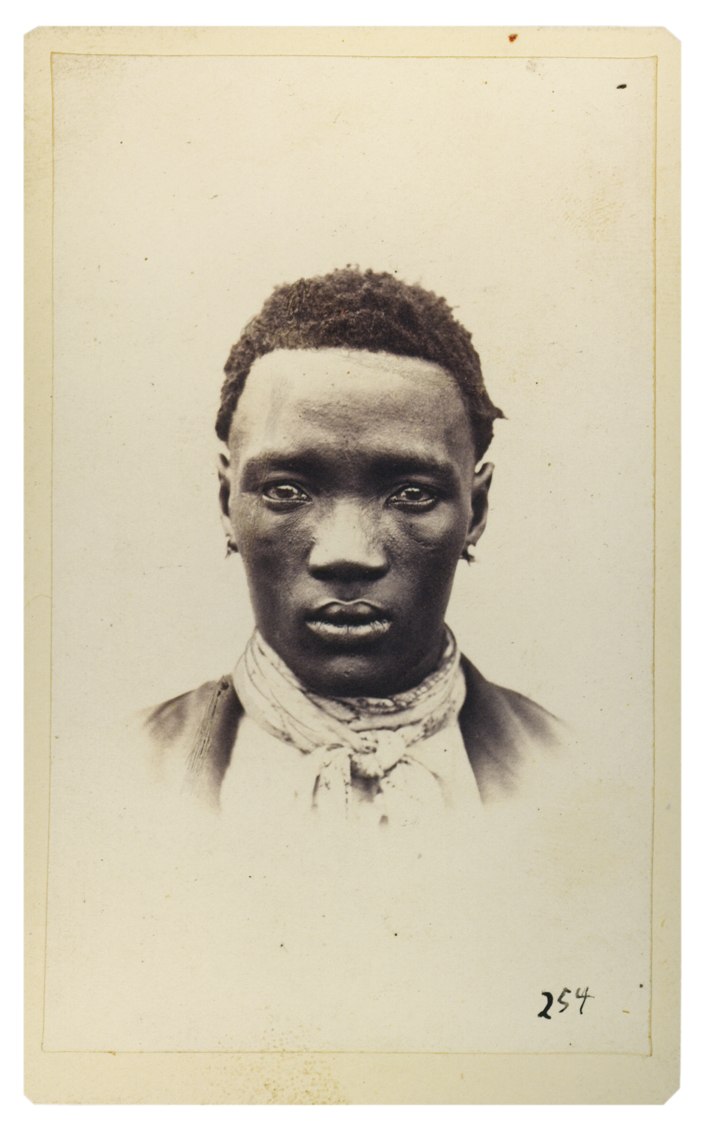
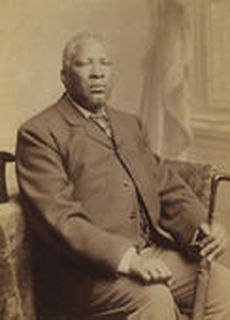
Khama III, Sebele I, and Bathoen I, who convinced the British government to not absorb the Bechuanaland Protectorate into the British South Africa Company

The British planned to eventually incorporate the Bechuanaland Protectorate into the Union of South Africa. In the years after the protectorate's creation, the United Kingdom entered talks with Cecil Rhodes to absorb it into the British South Africa Company. In response, three of the most influential chiefs—Khama III of the Ngwato, Sebele I of the Kwena, and Bathoen I of the Ngwaketse—made a diplomatic trip to the United Kingdom in 1895 and convinced the government not to complete the deal. This set a precedent of chiefs interacting with the British as a unified group and enshrined these three figures as early figures in Botswana's history as a single nation. Rhodes's handling of the failed Jameson Raid discouraged the British and negotiations were postponed indefinitely. The celebration of these chiefs resulted in the publication of Three Great African Chiefs: Khamé, Sebéle and Bathoeng by the London Missionary Society the same year. This text introduced a founding myth that their three respective tribes were created by three brothers.

Also in 1895, the capital was moved from Vryburg to another South African city, Mafeking, and the Ancient Ruins Company was registered to dig up prehistoric ruins in Bechuanaland and Rhodesia in search for gold. The protectorate was heavily affected by the 1890s African rinderpest epizootic, losing large portions of its livestock and wild game. The protectorate's railroad was built in 1897 as the main north–south transit line.

When the United Kingdom raised the Pioneer Column to go to war with the Ndebele people, Khama III of the Ngwato assisted by sending soldiers. Botswana became a staging ground for the Jameson Raid in 1896. The Kgatla tribe was later part of the Boer War, fighting alongside the British Army.

The early colonial economy of the Bechuanaland Protectorate remained much the same as the pre-colonial economy. The United Kingdom primarily used the protectorate as a supply of labour, offering high wages to Batswana who migrated south to work in mines. Taxes were also imposed, beginning with a hut tax in 1899, which was then replaced by a poll tax in 1909. A native tax was later imposed in 1919. Colonial taxes in the Bechuanaland Protectorate were higher than those in neighbouring colonies, causing mass exodus to the south, and the chiefs allowed more generous power sharing with citizens to incentivise them to stay. The United Kingdom considered integrating the protectorate into South Africa as it unified its southern African colonies, but it ultimately grouped them economically by creating the South African Customs Union, joining in 1910. Membership entitled the protectorate to only 2% of the union's revenue.

By 1910, all Tswana tribes had adopted Christianity. Bechuanaland sent several hundred soldiers to assist the British Army during World War I. The London Missionary Society found itself in decline at this time, and it gradually lost influence over the protectorate.

Sebele II became chief of the Kwena in 1918, succeeding his father, Sechele II. Sechele II had conflicted with the dominant London Missionary Society, permitting an Anglican presence and reinstating many traditional practices such as polygyny, rainmaking, and bogwera. Sebele II continued his father's challenge to the London Missionary Society, to the grievance of the British government.

The dual government of the chiefs and the colonial administration made administration difficult, so the administration created two advisory councils to standardise these authorities. The Native Advisory Council (later the African Advisory Council) was established in 1919. This annual meeting of the chiefs and other influential people in the protectorate allowed the British government to hear from and manage the tribes collectively instead of individually. Khama III of the Ngwato refused to participate, citing weak enforcement of alcohol prohibition in southern tribe. Khama III died in 1923 and was succeeded by Sekgoma II, who served until his own death in 1926. Sekgoma's son Seretse Khama was still an infant, so Tshekedi Khama became regent. Tshekedi came to be recognised as a representative for all of the Tswana tribes. As Seretse grew, Tshekedi insisted that he be given a liberal education rather than be sent to a Rhodesian industrial school.

=== Development and increased British influence ===
In the 1920s, chief Isang Pilane of the Kgatla people oversaw the Bechuanaland Protectorate's first major water development scheme, having sixteen boreholes drilled, seven of which became successful water supplies. These became more common over the following decades as the British government took interest in expanding the protectorate's economy. By the 1930s, Isang Pilane and the Native Advisory Council privatised the boreholes, as they were not maintained under collective ownership. A severe drought occurred in the early 1930s, killing over 60% of the protectorate's cattle.

The British government took a more active role in the protectorate's governance beginning in 1930. That year, it began providing direct funding to the protectorate. Charles Rey was appointed Resident Commissioner of the Bechuanaland Protectorate, and he was responsible for reorganising the economy around cattle exports. An initiative to reform the protectorate toward mining and commercial agricultural development was attempted but saw push back from the chiefs.

Resident Commissioner Rey came into conflict with chief Sebele II, having him exiled in 1931. Sebele II was replaced by his younger brother, Kgari. Further initiatives were attempted by the British government in 1934 to constrain the unchecked power of the chiefs following the overthrow of Sebele II. These initiatives mandated advisory councils that chiefs had to consult and required that the British government be given access to court records. Chief Bathoen II of Ngwaketse and regent Tshekedi Khama of Ngwato issued a legal challenge to these initiatives. Although the British court ruled against the challenge, the new policies were never fully implemented. Other restrictions were adopted through colonial proclamation to limit the ability of the chiefs to levy taxes and seize stray cattle. A new resident commissioner, Charles Arden-Clarke, was appointed in 1936 and worked more closely with the chiefs.

=== Early years of World War II ===
Fears of German attack in Bechuanaland grew in the lead up to World War II due to its strategic position between Britain's central and southern colonies in Africa. 11 days before war was declared, the British government warned the protectorate to be on standby, and military forces were organised. Four days after Britain declared war on Germany, Resident Commissioner Arden-Clarke held a meeting with the chiefs where they pledged full support for the war effort. The next day, the high commission issued a proclamation of emergency powers that gave it total control over public activity in the protectorate, but the chiefs were informed that they would be responsible for most enforcement and peacekeeping.

The earliest years of World War II had almost no effect on the people of Bechuanaland, and many only had a vague idea that the war existed. The colonial administration shrank as large numbers of white residents enlisted in the British Army. Those who remained were focused on security planning in case southern Africa became another front in the war. Against the wishes of the chiefs, the colonial administration encouraged Batswana who wished to serve with the British Army to enlist with the South African Native Military Corps. About 700 Batswana men enlisted with the group.

Maintaining the Bechuanaland Protectorate became a low priority for the United Kingdom during the Great Depression and World War II, and the protectorate received no funding from the United Kingdom during the war. The British Empire had relatively little control over Bechuanaland compared to its other territories, and British efforts to control wartime production in the protectorate were unsuccessful. The war drastically altered the protectorate's economy as it went on, introducing shortages, rationing, and higher prices. Profiteering and price gouging were common, and the colonial administration, unable to enforce price controls, resorted to gentlemen's agreements with traders. Taxes were raised and Colonial Development Fund projects were curtailed at the onset of World War II to establish financial independence from the empire. The Control of Livestock Industry Proclamation No. 1 of 1940 was passed to tax cattle, the protectorate's main industry, but it met overwhelming resistance from Batswana and the European Advisory Council. A war fund operated in Bechuanaland, and although the United Kingdom expected that donations be voluntary, chiefs invoked their authority over their tribes to enforce donations. It was replaced by a levy in 1941, but this was less popular and proved difficult to enforce.

=== Batswana participation in World War II ===
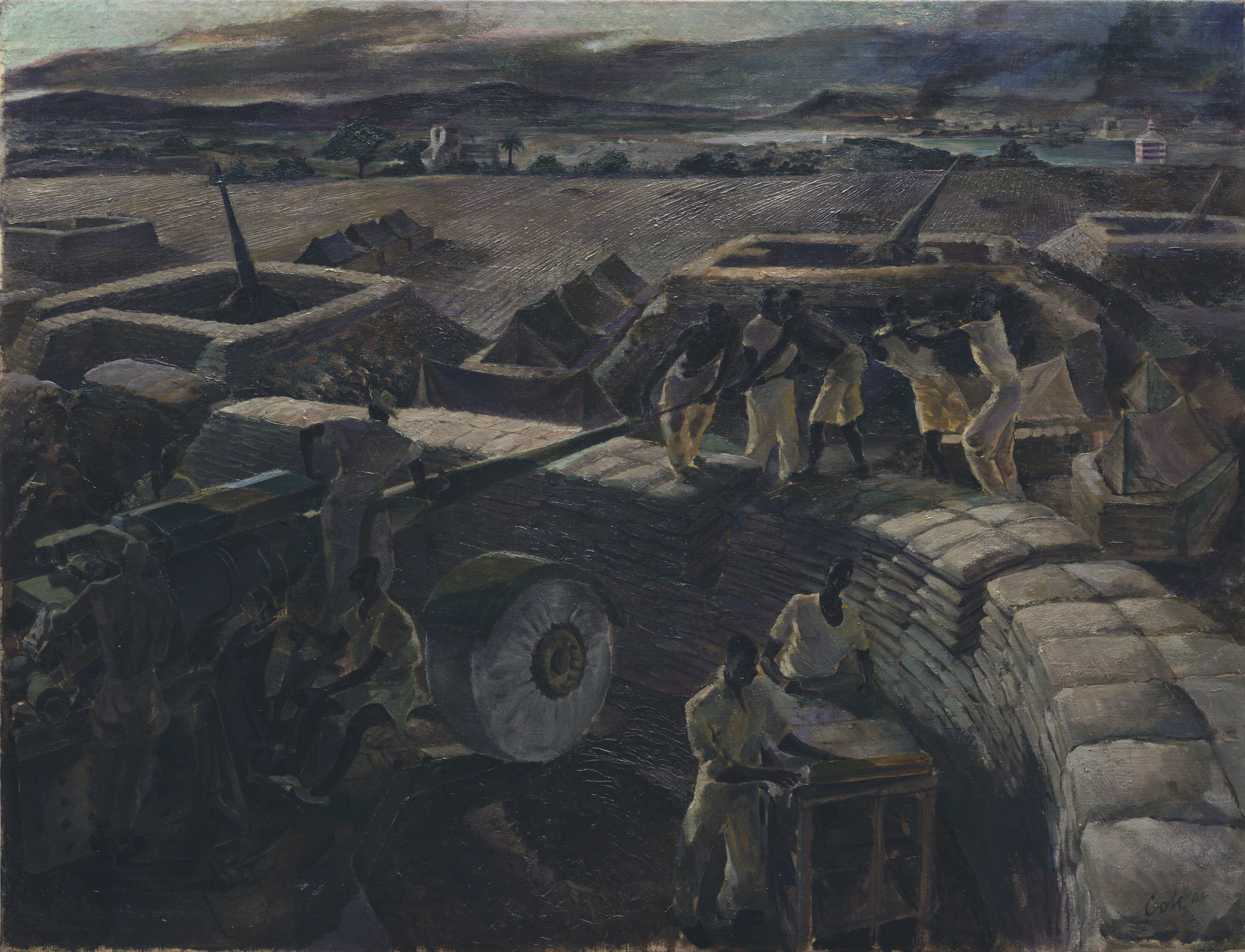
Bechuanaland Boys cleaning Aa Guns in the Twilight after Action, Syracuse, Sicily, 1944 art piece by Leslie Cole

Military recruitment began in Bechuanaland in 1941. About 5,500 men were trained and sent to war within the first six months. Another 5,000 Batswana men joined the war in 1942. In total, approximately 11,000 soldiers from Bechuanaland fought alongside the British Army during the war. Over 10,000 of these served in the British Army's African Auxiliary Pioneer Corps. The chiefs traditionally had the right to conscript soldiers, and they ignored the colonial government's wishes that military service should be entirely voluntary. Regent Tshekedi Khama of Ngwato made himself unpopular by using military conscription as a tool for control, weaponising it to silence critics and political opponents. Men who wished to avoid conscription sometimes fled to South Africa or to remote areas like the Okavango Delta swamps and the Kgalagadi bush. Others used more immediate precautions, such as digging holes when recruiters visited.

The chiefs wished to leverage their participation in the war for additional rights within the British Empire, and they feared that British defeat would make them subjects of Germany or South Africa, a fate they wished to avoid. The war effort was also an opportunity to reclaim Tswana men who had migrated to South Africa for mining jobs; the chiefs wished to end this practice and felt they could do so by offering military jobs. Some military pay was deferred to the families of soldiers, and limitations on exports were lifted during the war, causing an influx of money into Bechuanaland.

Relative to other nations in the British Empire, the people of Bechuanaland approved of the war. Many Batswana held a sense of loyalty to the empire or felt that their interests were aligned. Some chiefs, such as Kgari Sechele II of the Kwena and Molefi Pilane of the Kgatla, personally enlisted. They served as regimental sergeant majors, the highest rank available to Batswana.

Toward the end of World War II, the colonial government allowed Batswana to have business licenses and operate within the protectorate. This had previously been restricted to whites and Indians.

The High Commissions Territories Corps was stationed in the Middle East from 1946 to 1949.

=== Independence movement ===
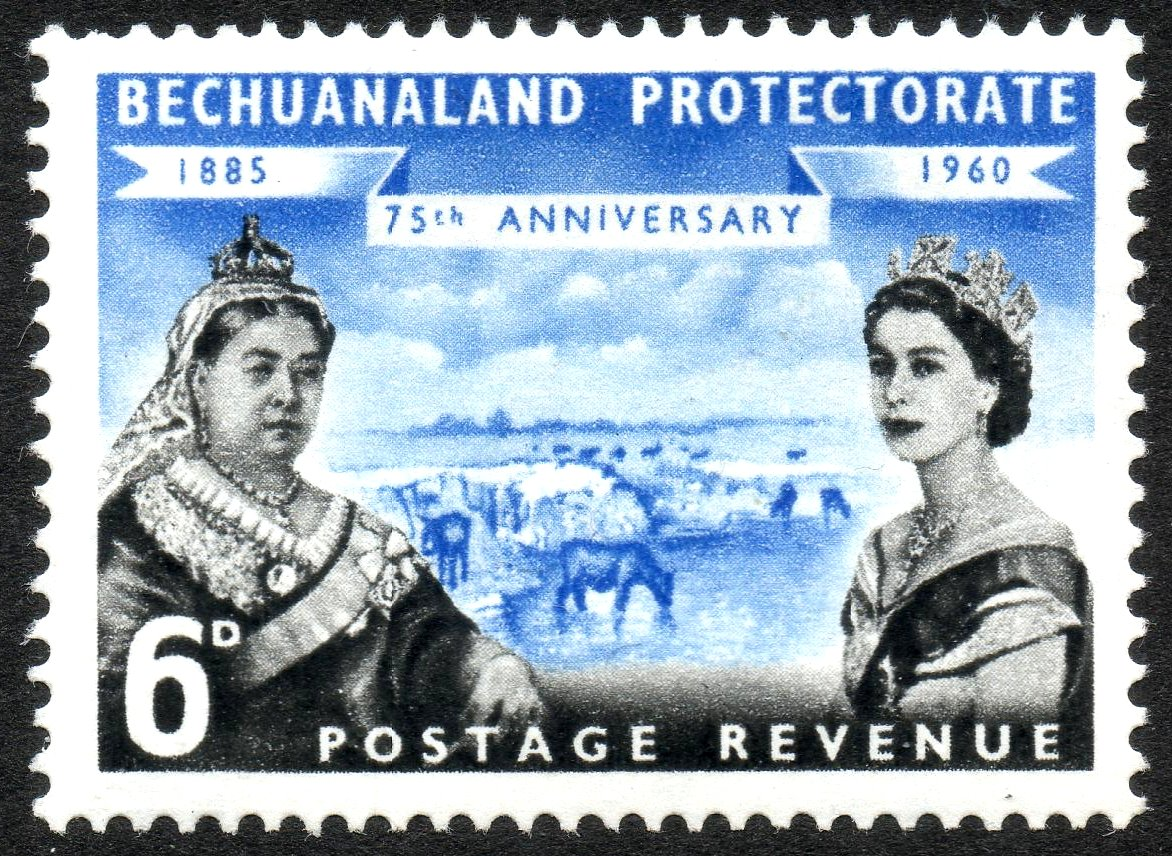
A 1960 stamp of the Bechuanaland Protectorate featuring images of Queen Victoria and Elizabeth II, the first and last British monarchs of the protectorate

The end of World War II came with drastic social change. The chiefs came to be seen as less essential to social structure, and many gave up their universal claims over tribal cattle. Other public resources, such as land and labour, were privatised and commodified. Access to education created a class of liberal intellectuals who opposed the rule of the chiefs and began forming their own centres of power in workers' associations and civic groups. By 1946, only 2% of the population had employment outside of agriculture and services. The protectorate saw a major increase in birth rates as part of the mid-20th century baby boom in the years after World War II, accompanied by an increase in life expectancy. The colonial administration began its first development project in the protectorate, a slaughterhouse, in the 1950s. The British, still expecting to merge the protectorate into South Africa, finally scrapped this plan after the beginning of Apartheid. As efforts began to develop a new path for the protectorate's future, the protectorate was placed in a state of limbo, and no path forward was clear. One proposal was to incorporate it into the Federation of Rhodesia and Nyasaland, which the United Kingdom formed under a policy of "multi-racial partnership".

When the Ngwato heir Seretse Khama came of age, regent Tshekedi Khama attempted to hold on to power. Seretse married a white woman, Ruth Williams, while studying in the United Kingdom, causing scandal in the Ngwato royal family. Though the public initially opposed the marriage, Tshekedi's unpopularity shifted opinion in Seretse's favour. The issue was raised in the kgotla in 1949, and Tshekedi's rule was overwhelmingly rejected by thousands in attendance. Tshekedi and his supporters fled to the Kwena in exile.

The British government was less tolerant of Seretse's marriage to a white woman. In an attempt to appease the Apartheid government of South Africa, it banished the couple from the protectorate in 1950. This provoked a burgeoning nationalist movement among Seretse's supporters in the protectorate, which fully emerged in 1952. During Seretse's absence, the United Kingdom placed the district commissioner in charge for four years before appointing Rasebolai Kgamane, a supporter of Tshekedi, as regent.

The Ngwato tribe rebelled against Seretse's banishment. His supporters petitioned for his return, and riots broke out when they were denied. Seretse was eventually allowed to return in 1956. By this time, the stricter racial segregation in Apartheid South Africa dissuaded the United Kingdom from appeasing it. Throughout the ordeal of Seretse's banishment, power shifted away from the chiefdomship and toward electoral bodies. Tshekedi and Seretse made peace upon Seretse's return, and Seretse became the de facto leader of the Ngwato, though the United Kingdom forbade him from being the official chief. With British support, the Ngwato tribe developed a tribal council, of which both Seretse and Tshekedi were members. Other tribes then established similar tribal councils, which served as checks on the power of the chiefs. Some animosity remained between the two men: Tshekedi wished to retain the tribal government and the power of the chiefs, while Seretse envisioned a representative democracy and weaker chiefs. The amount of power invested in the chiefs became the most contentious issue in the burgeoning independence movement, especially among the Ngwato people and the Khama family.

The Bechuanaland Protectorate Federal Party was the first political party formed in the protectorate when it was created by the Ngwato union leader Leetile Disang Raditladi in 1959. Composed primarily of elites and intellectuals, it advocated a unification of the Tswana tribes. The party failed to gain support and was short-lived. The following year, the Bechuanaland People's Party (BPP, later the Botswana People's Party) was created as a more radical party, objecting to traditional tribal government and gaining appeal among migrant workers. It was led by Motsamai Mpho, Philip Matante, and Kgalemang Morsete. The BPP, created as a Tswana counterpart to the African National Congress party of South Africa, supported immediate independence and the total abolition of chiefdom. Fearing that the BPP would undermine the existing government and ignite tensions with the Apartheid government of South Africa, the chiefs and the British government restricted its ability to meet.

The protectorate's tribes collectively formed a legislative council in 1961. The Kwena people found themselves under a regent, Neale Sechele, in 1963, meaning that they had little political influence as the independence movement developed. The Bechuanaland Protectorate Development Plan 1963/1968 was drafted through a deliberative process in 1963, creating an outline for the nation's independence.

As the population was politically inactive overall, the United Kingdom came to be one of the leading forces toward independence. Worrying that the BPP was too radical, the United Kingdom encouraged its preferred leader, Seretse Khama, to form a political party. Though Khama agreed with the BPP's antiracist and republican values, he opposed its dogmatic approach to politics and its acceptance of socialism. He agreed to give up his claim over the Ngwato people to serve as a politician, forming the Bechuanaland Democratic Party (BDP, later the Botswana Democratic Party) in 1962. The BDP established itself as the "party of chiefs", and it adopted ideas associated with pre-colonial tribal rule. The United Kingdom supported the BDP, understanding that it would maintain the colonial era livestock trade. By 1963, the Kgatla chief Linchwe was the only chief who opposed the BDP and had political influence, but the Kgatla people were in favour of the BDP, so he remained apolitical. A transition process began with BDP expected to rule an independent Botswana, and the colonial government worked with BDP leadership to prepare them for running a nation.

A conference was held in 1963 to oversee the creation of a new constitution. Internal strife within the BPP meant that the BDP had the most influence over the process. Tshekedi Khama had died by this time, so Bathoen II became the leader of the pro-federalisation faction, believing it would keep power in the hands of the chiefs. The United Kingdom and the Batswana politicians endorsed a unitary national government because Botswana was too poor to divide its resources and because a lack of centralisation would make it vulnerable to attacks from other nations. Federalisation proved politically unviable, so a compromise was made that the chiefs would form the House of Chiefs, an advisory body within the Parliament of Botswana. The chiefs still opposed this arrangement, and in a movement led by Bathoen, the House of Chiefs passed a vote of no confidence in the new government, but its lack of political power prevented it from leveraging meaningful reform. The District Council's Act was passed as another means of limiting chiefs power by creating councils to preside over each district and town, making these elected bodies the primary local authorities.

Gaborone was built in 1965 and declared the new capital. It was built on British crown land, which provided a neutral location not controlled by any one tribe. The constitution was implemented the same year. With this in effect, the United Kingdom granted the protectorate self-governance. 1965 also saw the passing of the District Councils Act that adapted the colonial role of district commissioner by tying it to newly created district councils, and it saw the establishment of the state-owned National Development Bank.

Mpho split from the BPP to create the Bechuanaland Independence Party (BIP) in 1965. Led by Seretse Khama and Quett Masire, the BDP campaigned in almost every village in the protectorate leading up to the first general election. Unlike other political figures in Bechuanaland, Seretse Khama had appeal across the different tribes. The BDP was subsequently elected to lead the first government. The BPP won only three seats in the legislature, and the BIP failed to win any. After the election, the Botswana National Front (BNF) was created as a unified opposition to the BDP. Founded by Kenneth Koma, the BNF became the BDP's largest rival.

The BDP chose Khama as the nation's prime minister. Unlike most inaugural political parties in Africa, the BDP was a moderate conservative party instead of a radical anti-colonial party. After its formation, the House of Chiefs delivered a vote of no confidence in the constitution in 1966, leading to a national campaign in support of the constitution that garnered enough support for the chiefs to end their efforts to challenge it. The protectorate was granted independence as the Republic of Botswana in 1966.

== Republic of Botswana ==
=== Botswana in 1966 ===
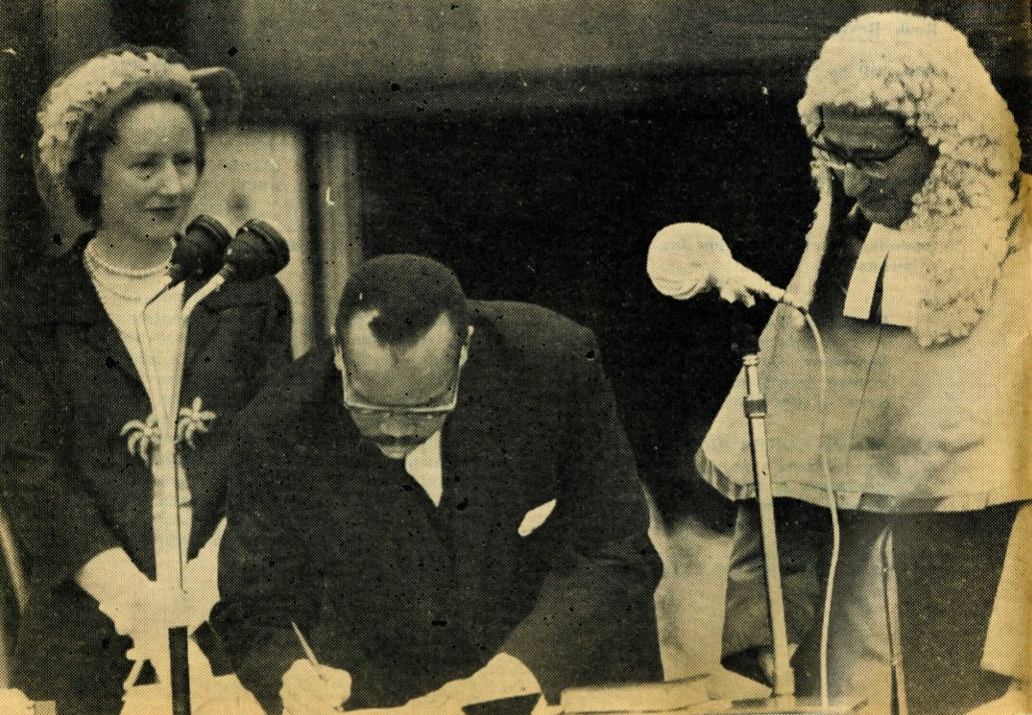
Seretse Khama signing the oath of office to become Botswana's first President in 1966

Independence for Botswana meant the implementation of liberal democracy, bringing about elections, human rights protections, and civil service. This allowed for a merit-based system of promotion and the creation of a technocratic bureaucracy. The nation formed a government adapted from the Westminster system, and Prime Minister Seretse Khama became President Seretse Khama. A national identity was crafted, bringing together disparate ethnic groups in a single Tswana label, with a culture based on that of the Tswana tribes.

Botswana retained much of its pre-colonial tribal institutions after independence. This was an effect of both the strong centralised government associated with the Tswana tribes and the relatively limited intervention of the British government in colonial times. The deliberative nature of the nation's politics before and after independence was an exception to many other African nations that became authoritarian after independence. Instead of abolishing the chiefdom, the new government incorporated it into the legal system, giving the chiefs judicial powers through the kgotla, subject to appellate courts. A tradition of subservience to leadership, once given to the chiefs, shifted to the presidency. The government reinforced its stability by staffing its civil service with foreign experts, as opposed to other new African countries that often expelled foreign experts. This preserved a Western-style bureaucratic government with an emphasis on development.

The United Kingdom continued funding Botswana for the first five years of its existence. Its peaceful, democratic status relative to other African nations meant that it received more aid from Western organisations. At the time of independence, Botswana was an extremely poor nation, more so than most others in Africa. It did not have an educated workforce, with only 40 citizens having university degrees, and there were no known natural resource supplies to support the nation. Botswana was dependent on the Apartheid regime in South Africa for access to the global community, and the majority of Botswana's labourers were migrant workers in South Africa. Botswana came into more direct conflict with Rhodesia, which caused military skirmishes until 1978.

Limited British involvement meant that little development had taken place since colonisation. Literacy was at 25%, and only 10 kilometres of paved road existed. Approximately 90% of the population was in abject poverty, and most of the population were cattle farmers or subsistence farmers. As the nation achieved independence, a severe drought eliminated 30–50% of the cattle population. Approximately half of Batswana were dependent on the World Food Programme to avoid starvation. Other nations had low expectations for Botswana, and throughout Africa it was seen as an Apartheid Bantustan. This relationship with Apartheid was also a factor in Botswana's success as an independent nation: the Batswana leadership wished to avoid the same fate as South Africa should the nation fail, and the diplomatic connections formed with the West to prevent subsumption by South Africa meant that Botswana was more trusting of Western powers and willing to accept their assistance.

The early leadership of Botswana was dominated by the ruling tribal families as well as a small number of highly educated public servants. Their economic and ideological similarities meant that the government remained stable without political infighting. Though Bathoen left his position as chief to pursue politics, most other chiefs accepted their reduced political power in the new government. Further activity of the chiefs was regulated by the Chieftainship Act of 1966.

A lack of corruption gave the state more legitimacy and won the favour of Western allies. Unlike most newly formed African nations, much of the leadership came from the agricultural community, meaning that their interests aligned with the majority. This encouraged the new government to retain colonial-era policies that benefited cattle farmers. The Botswana Meat Commission was created to regulate the beef industry. The BDP's pan-tribal appeal and the mutual interest in establishing independence further incentivised the new government to act in the interest of the majority. Small groups of white settlers remained in the country and objected to its independence. Though they would later be crucial in Botswana's development, mineral rights were given low priority upon independence, and the tribes transferred them to the central government in 1967.

=== Presidency of Seretse Khama ===
The Sir Seretse Khama International Airport, named after the first president of Botswana

Khama was widely popular and seen as the natural leader of all the Tswana peoples. His administration implemented policies geared toward the creation of infrastructure and public goods, particularly the paving of roads. He began the construction of schools, slaughterhouses, and boreholes that continued over the following decades. Inhabited land of both the Tswana and the San was used to construct the boreholes. Development came at the expense of commerce and production, which was limited to the funding of livestock. Considerable focus was placed on nourishing cattle and constructing slaughterhouses to stimulate the beef industry amid a draught. Public welfare programs were also established. The discovery of diamonds ensured that these programs received sufficient funding. These investments and a conservative approach to government spending prevented the Dutch disease scenario that crippled other resource-laden African countries. Education was expanded throughout the nation, and the Tswana language was standardised alongside English at the expense of other languages. Khama justified this as a means to achieve unity.

Quett Masire served as Vice-President under Seretse Khama as well as Minister of Finance. He exercised control over the nation's budgeting and spending by creating a series of National Development Plans, subject to the approval of the National Assembly and the Economic Committee of the Cabinet. Iterations of these plans remained a central facet of government policy well after Khama and Masire's successors took office.

In 1967, diamonds were discovered in Botswana by the South African diamond company De Beers, and operations began shortly after. Copper deposits were found in Selebi-Phikwe that year, further revealing the nation's mineral wealth. The government partnered with De Beers in 1969 to carry out larger diamond mining operations, and it was involved with a renegotiation of the Southern African Customs Union the same year to greatly improve its economic leverage in the region. A mine in Morupule began producing coal in 1973, providing the nation with a large share of its power supply. The Orapa diamond mine was opened in Orapa in 1971, and a revenue sharing agreement was finalised between the government and De Beers in 1974. Masire later confirmed that De Beers had funded his private ventures, causing speculation that the company may have received an advantageous deal in the matter.

The Water Act and the Tribal Land Act were enacted in 1968, creating the Water Apportionment Board and twelve land boards, respectively. These oversaw the apportionment of water and land rights by the state rather than through the ownership of each tribe. Through this, they effectively subsumed the traditional powers of the chiefs. The Tribal Grazing Lands Policy was implemented in 1975 to prevent overgrazing, but it proved unsuccessful. In effect, it allowed wealthy citizens to claim large plots of land for cattle at the expense of less wealthy citizens.

The first election after independence took place in 1969. The BDP did slightly worse relative to its 1965 performance, and Vice-President Masire lost his seat to Bathoen, requiring him to take a specially elected seat. The BPP faded in relevance as the politics of Botswana developed.

The state-owned Botswana Development Corporation was founded in 1970, and the Orapa diamond mine opened in 1971. By 1973, diamonds made up 10% of Botswana's GDP, and by the end of the 1970s, mining was the largest industry in the country. The government of Botswana renegotiated its mining agreement with De Beers between 1971 and 1975, shifting the majority of earnings to the nation. As the diamond economy developed and investments were made back into the country, Botswana escaped poverty and came to be seen as a success among the other nations in post-colonial sub-Saharan Africa. These developments made Botswana the fastest growing economy in the world. The upper and middle classes saw the most benefit, increasing wealth inequality, but it also meant taxes could be lowered, which earned the support of peasants.

Botswana's development and its use of foreign civil service was successful enough that the government convinced the United States to send the Peace Corps without traditional limitations on what roles the organisation can perform. With the 1970s came an increase in young locally educated Batswana, who became more influential in government. As these newcomers received similar education and began working in the same administrative culture, there was no major operational difference between the foreigner-led civil service and that run by the Batswana.

The Ministry of Development Planning had briefly existed following a schism in the Ministry of Finance between traditional caretakers who had been associated with the protectorate against Masire's supporters who wished to see more aggressive development. The latter took control, and the ministries were reunified as the Ministry of Finance and Development Planning in 1970. Because of the limited number of qualified people to manage the economy, this ministry took almost full control of the government's spending and initiated the Shashe Project that called for extensive development exceeding the country's GDP. This included the establishment of a copper and nickel mining complex, which became the government's highest priority.

In 1973, Seepapitso IV became the first chief to be suspended from his position in the post-colonial era. The BDP was again highly successful in the 1974 election. Minimum wages were introduced the same year.

Botswana began issuing its own currency, the Botswana pula, in 1976. Bank of Botswana governor Quill Hermans pushed for financial disentanglement from South Africa and its South African rand. Despite international concerns that Botswana might not be able to maintain its own currency, Khama felt that his economic advisors were capable and trusted their decision. Within a decade of independence, Botswana was one of the wealthiest nations in the Third World. The economic transformation is referred to as Botswana's "miracle".

Linchwe II, chief of the Kgatla people, reinstated the bogwera initiation rite for his tribe in 1975, aggravating the national government. Khama took a universalist approach in his administration, avoiding ethnic politics and rejecting the influence of tribal leaders in favour of civil servants. He at times asked individuals to resign if one ethnic group became too influential in the civil service. The Tswana peoples feared that dissent from the Kalanga minority could be destabilising. To address this, Khama incorporated educated members of the Kalanga tribe into the government, appointing many to high-ranking positions. The decision was controversial, and it spawned conspiracy theories about malevolent influence of the Kalanga. These sometimes centred on the Bakalanga Students Association, which became the Society for the Promotion of Ikalanga Language in 1980.

Fear of neighbouring white-led governments in Namibia, Rhodesia, and South Africa, as well as the danger of the Angolan Civil War, led Botswana to create a national military in 1977. Prior to this, the Botswana Police Service was responsible for national security. The lack of military meant that Botswana was not susceptible to leading causes of instability in other African nations: military coups and corruption through military spending. The military saw combat the following year when Rhodesian militants attacked Leshoma, killing fifteen soldiers.

In its partnership with De Beers, the government of Botswana formed the Debswana mining company in 1978, acquiring significant income for the state. Mining became the predominant industry of the nation's economy over the following decades, and Botswana became the world's fastest growing economy. Foreign involvement in the economy became a political issue at this time as outsiders collected on the nation's growth while domestic jobs developed slowly. Cattle farming, which had already been affected by a major outbreak of foot-and-mouth disease in 1977, lost the significance that it had previously held.

=== Presidency of Quett Masire ===
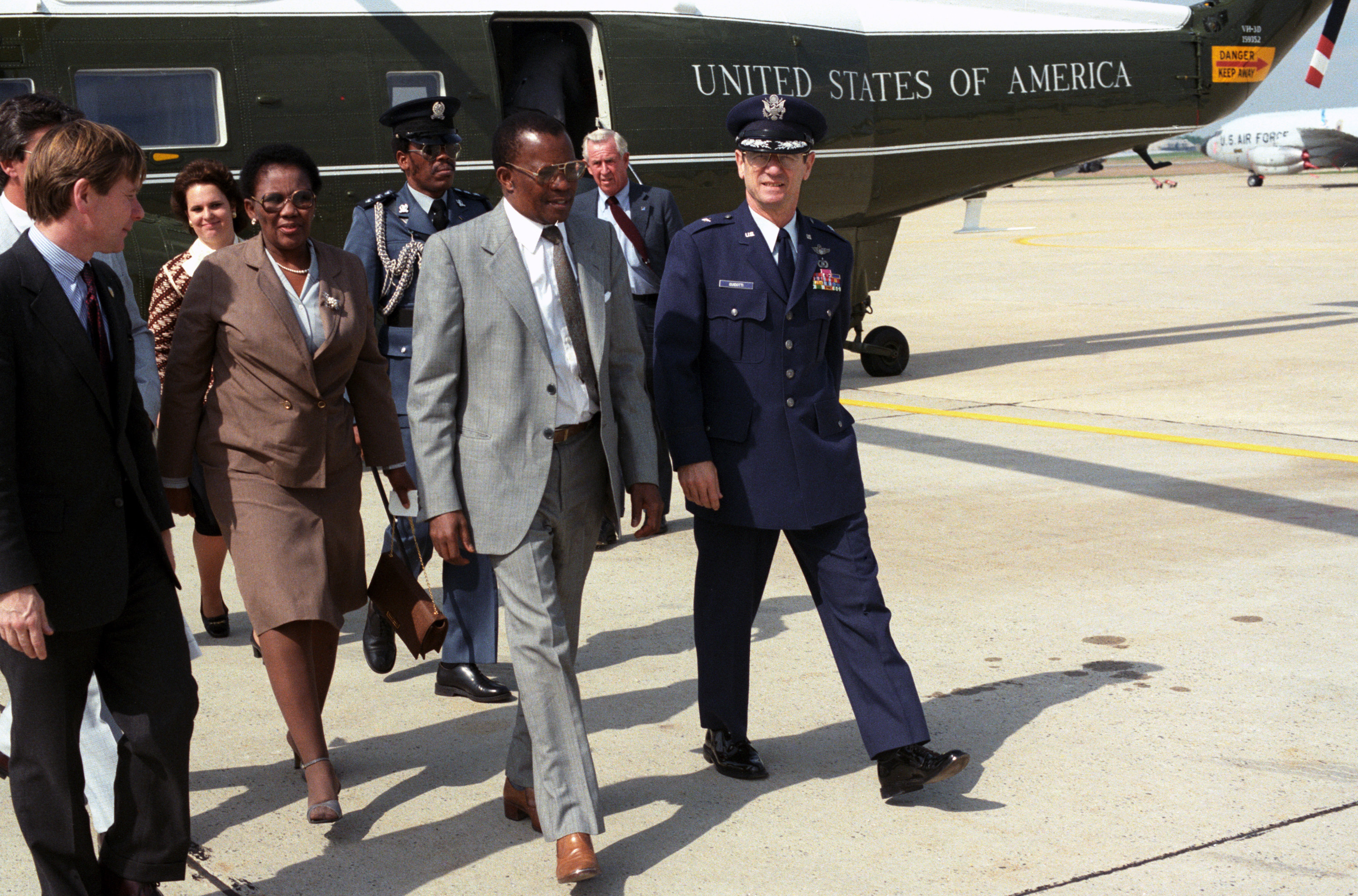
Quett Masire visiting the United States in 1984

After Seretse Khama's death in 1980, Vice-President Quett Masire became the president of Botswana. Despite concerns about Khama's succession, Masire maintained the government infrastructure he helped build and preserved faith in the government. To appease Khama's Ngwato tribe and the other northern tribes, Masire appointed Khama's cousin, Lenyeletse Seretse, as vice-president. Popular opinion among the Ngwato was that Khama's son, Ian Khama, was entitled to the presidency. Upon Lenyeletse's death in 1983, Masire selected Peter Mmusi to replace him. This time he selected someone from a southern tribe, so as not to set a precedent that the president and vice-president must always be from opposite regions.

Botswana was part of the Southern African Development Coordination Conference established in 1980 to create a southern African market. The nation was affected by the early 1980s recession. The Jwaneng diamond mine began operation 1982, becoming the most lucrative diamond mine in the world. The University of Botswana was created the same year when it split from the University of Botswana, Lesotho and Swaziland. Legal developments in 1982, the Financial Assistance Policy and the legalisation of commercial activity by civil servants, spurred the nation's economy but also loosened regulations that would prevent corruption. As democracy and economic growth proved to be long-term trends, Botswana garnered a reputation as an "African miracle".

Strong opposition to the BDP-controlled government first arose in the 1980s. Opposition parties began winning local elections, interest groups began forming, and five major anti-BDP newspapers began publication. Previously dependent on support by specific ethnic groups, the BNF gained support among the working class. By the 1984 general election, it was a competitive opposition party.

A severe drought affected Botswana from 1982 to 1987, necessitating government food assistance for about 65% of rural Batswana. Masire's critics associated him with this drought as it coincided with the beginning of his presidency, suggesting that Khama had a divine mandate that Masire did not. Mid-way through the 1980s, the diamond industry reached its peak at 53% of the national GDP. By this time, the nation's economy became strong enough that citizens were no longer incentivised to opt for subsistence agriculture or migration for work in South Africa. Entrepreneurship became more widespread, particularly among former government workers who moved from the public sector to the private sector. Free secondary education was established in 1989. Trade unions and other special interest groups developed in the 1980s to influence public policy, although the government was often unwilling to acknowledge them. It responded to the burgeoning labour movement by passing heavy restrictions on unions in 1983. The decade also introduced movements for the recognition of minority ethnicities, rejecting the national Tswana identity.

During the 1980s, South Africa began military incursions into Botswana to seek out South African rebels. In response to the civilian casualties, the government of Botswana increased military spending. It also tasked the military with wildlife protection and anti-poaching enforcement in response to the danger posed by armed poachers.

The first case of HIV/AIDS in Botswana was diagnosed in 1985, and over the following decade the country became the most severely affected in the world. Life expectancy in Botswana would drop from 67 to 50 by 1997. A dramatic shift in Botswana's health system followed through the 1980s and 1990s; Western medicine grew more widely respected alongside traditional healing, and private hospitals were established to coexist with the government-run facilities.

The early 1990s recession affected Botswana. A landmark constitutional court case brought by Unity Dow ended with a ruling in 1991 that children could inherit citizenship from their mothers as well as their fathers, which was adopted into law with the Citizenship Act of 1995.

The Kgabo Commission was held in 1991 to investigate governmental land boards, and it found that ethical violations had been committed by Vice-President Peter Mmusi and BDP Secretary General Daniel Kwelagobe, both of whom were also members of the Cabinet of Botswana. Facing outrage within the government and among the public, both resigned. The fallout created two polarised factions within the party, one led by the two former cabinet members (the Big Two), and one led by their opponents (the Big Five): Festus Mogae, Bihiti Temane, Chapson Butale, Gaositwe Chiepe, and their leader Mompati Merafhe. This built on tensions that had grown between the southern leadership of the BLP and the new generation of politicians from the north. Masire chose Mogae as the new vice-president.

Worried about the possibility of normalising corruption, Masire hired the deputy head of the Hong Kong Independent Commission Against Corruption (Hong Kong) to create a similar organisation in Botswana. The Directorate on Corruption and Economic Crime was created in 1994, and a land board tribunal was created to hear appeals of land board decisions in 1995.

The BDP's position as the dominant party received its first serious challenge in light of the Kgabo Commission. The scandal and the resulting schism in the BDP allowed the BNF to become a more competitive opposition party after the 1994 general election. With the added complication of urbanisation reducing the BDP's rural base, opposition parties held a significant minority in the National Assembly. Following Mmusi's death, Kwelagobe aligned with Ponatshego Kedikilwe, and they formed the Barata-Phathi faction of the BDP. The Big Five developed into the A-Team faction.

Botswana benefited from the end of the South African Apartheid government in 1994, as the new African-led government did not restrict Botswana's growth or engage in military operations across the border. As the region stabilised, economic developments like shopping malls, property speculation, and citizen-owned tourism expanded.

The Ngwaketse tribe came into conflict with the government in April 1994, when minister of local government and lands Patrick Balope accused chief Seepapitso IV of failure to fulfil his duties and ordered the chief's suspension—the second suspension of Seepapitso's rule. Seepapitso's son Leema accepted an appointment to the role, against Seepapitso's wishes. The tribe wrestled with the issue of Leema's ambiguous legitimacy and the fear that tribal culture would not longer be recognised, and the removal became a national issue. Seepapitso filed a legal challenge, and the court ruled on 22 February 1995 that while Seepapitso's removal was legal, Leema's appointment was not. With the power of appointment returned to the tribe, they refused to choose a new leader as a form of protest. The government then relented and allowed Seepapitso to be reinstated.

The ritual murder of Segametsi Mogomotsi, a 14-year-old girl from Mochudi, took place in November 1994. Social unrest broke out when the suspects, who were wealthy businessmen and politicians, were released for lack of evidence. Over the following months, student-led protests and riots against the use of occult practices like ritual murder to gain wealth took place.

An outbreak of contagious bovine pleuropneumonia in 1995 caused the deaths of 320,000 cattle. The Agriculture Act of 1995 expanded the process of privatising communal land.

Minority tribes increasingly pushed for recognition beginning in the 1990s. The government began the removal of San people from the Central Kalahari Game Reserve in 1995. While it argued that the intention was to help integrate communities that were too remote, and it offered livestock to incentivise cooperation, international organisations accused the government of coercion and forced displacement to make room for mining. The first major legal effort to protect the rights of ethnic minorities came from a 1995 motion in parliament to define the constitution as tribally neutral, but it was tabled. The Kamanakao Association was formed the same year by the academic Lydia Nyati-Ramahobo to protect the rights of the Yeyi people.

A series of governmental and electoral reforms were implemented in the final years of Masire's presidency. Election supervision was transferred to an independent body, the voting age was lowered from 21 to 18, postal voting was implemented, and policies were enacted to protect labour rights and gender equality. Masire wished to create a stable order of succession and to ensure that his chosen successor Vice-President Mogae became president, so he worked with the lawyer Parks Tafa to draft a constitutional amendment. This implemented automatic succession and term limits for the presidency. He then forced the amendment through on his own initiative. Reforming the nation's economy, a tentative system of tripartism was implemented to bring together government, the private sector, and labour representatives. When the party was selecting its central committee membership in 1997, the risk of factionalism grew severe enough that Masire cancelled its internal election and had the factions give him lists of names.

=== Presidency of Festus Mogae ===
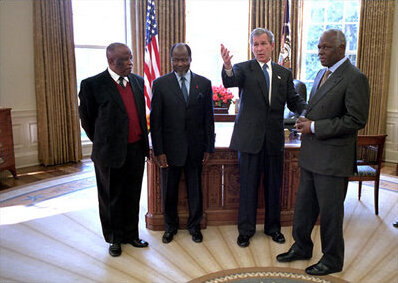
Festus Mogae alongside foreign presidents Joaquim Chissano, George W. Bush, and José Eduardo dos Santos in 2002

Masire stepped down as president on 1 April 1998, and he was succeeded by Vice-President Festus Mogae. Mogae made the controversial decision to appoint Ian Khama, commander of the army and the son of Seretse Khama, as the next vice-president, passing his choice through by threatening to dissolve parliament. Although they were officially neutral between the factions of the BDP, Mogae and Khama were both understood to be major figures among the A-Team.

1998 saw one of many splits within the BNF opposition party. It had divided into two factions: the conservatives who held socialist beliefs and the progressives who held social democratic beliefs. Violence at the party's congress saw progressives split off into their own party, the Botswana Congress Party (BCP), which became the main opposition party until they lost most of their seats in the 1999 election. This division of the opposition, as well as the civil reforms of the previous years, allowed the BDP to regain some of the seats that it lost in 1994. Several southern members of the BCP's leadership returned to the BNF after all of the top positions were taken by northerners.

To raise themselves to the level of the Tswana tribes, the Yeyi people named a paramount chief in 1999, but this went unrecognised by the Chieftainship Act. They brought the issue to the Supreme Court, which struck the relevant provision of the law as discriminatory. Mogae established a commission in 2000 to review minority tribes' representation in the House of Chiefs, which in turn caused protest from those who felt Mogae sought to undermine the power of the chiefs. The commission determined that the House of Chiefs should be retained, and it was renamed to the Setswana Ntlo ya Dikgosi. Other proposed changes were not accepted following pushback from the major Tswana tribes, particularly the Ngwato. The following year, the Kgatla-baga-Mmanaana people saw their chief Gobuamang Gobuamang II formally recognised as a minor kgosi within the Kwena territory where they reside.

The Botswana–Namibia border came under dispute in 1999 when both countries claimed a territory in the Caprivi Strip. In the 2000s, Botswana invested heavily in the development of an air force. Botswana Television was established in 2000. The Tsodilo Hills became a World Heritage Site in 2001. The San people issued a legal challenge in 2002 to contest their expulsion from the Central Kalahari Game Reserve, but the case was dismissed. Mosadi Seboko of the Lete people became the first female leader of a tribe in 2003. Mogae had one of the government's most prominent critics, Kenneth Good, deported in February 2005. The Three Dikgosi Monument was unveiled in 2005.

Mogae considered the nation's HIV/AIDS pandemic to be the most important issue during his presidency. To combat it, he made antiretroviral treatments for HIV/AIDS freely available.

=== Presidency of Ian Khama ===
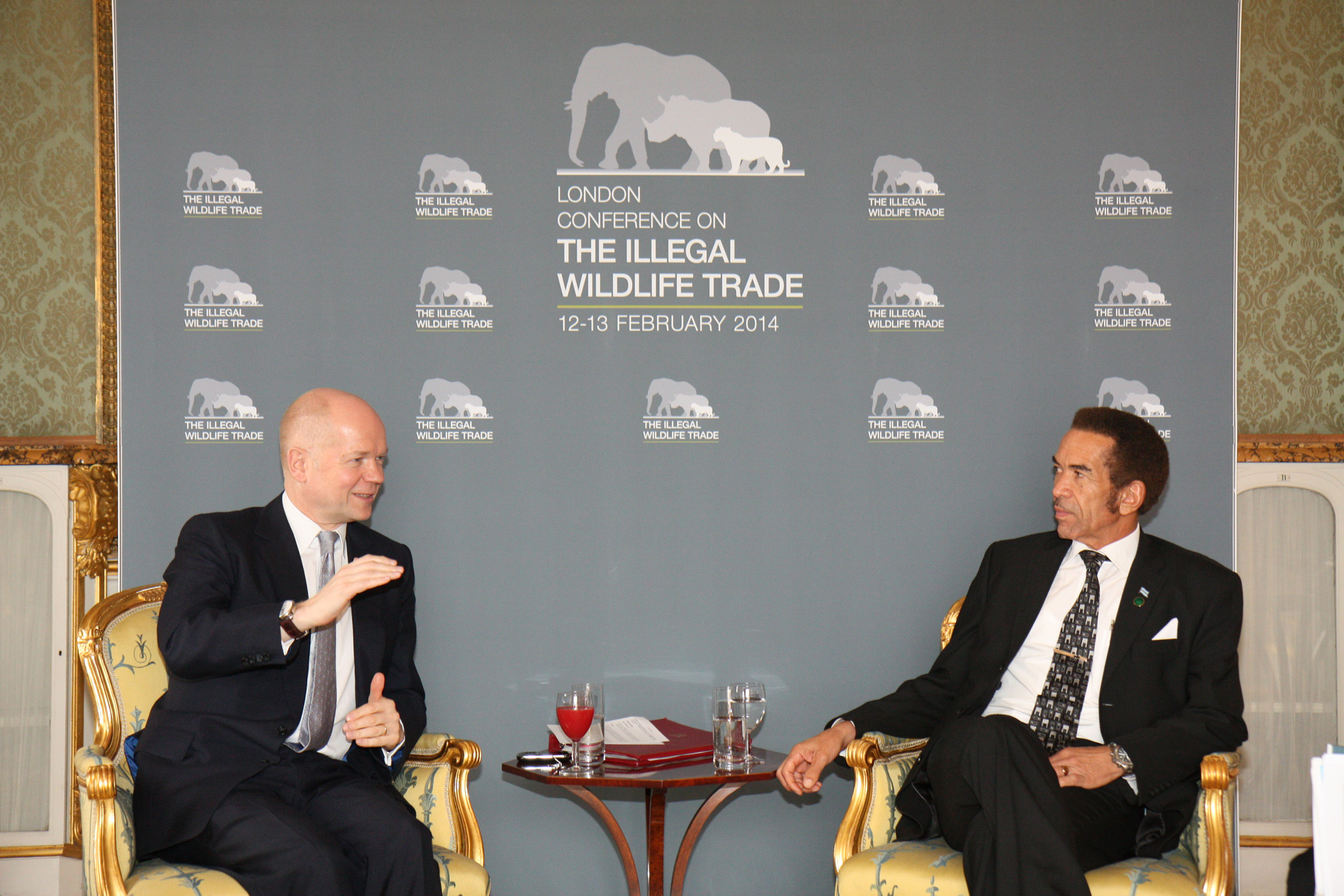
Ian Khama meeting with William Hague in London

Ian Khama succeeded to the presidency at the end of Mogae's term on 1 April 2008. His style of leadership was advertised as following the "four Ds": democracy, development, dignity, and discipline. After taking office, he restructured the nation's executive in a more hierarchical manner, centralising power around the presidency.

Khama placed emphasis on national security in his administration. During his tenure, the Directorate of Intelligence and Security came to be known for politically motivated espionage and arrests against his political opponents. He also appointed several former military figures in his government Botswana was less involved in the African Union during Khama's presidency, instead presenting a more Western-orientated foreign policy.

The 2008 financial crisis pressured Botswana's economy, which remained dependent on diamond mines despite the government's efforts. The diamond industry ended a steady decline when it stabilised at about 39% of the nation's GDP in 2009.

Regulation of chiefs was reformed in 2008 with the Bogosi Act. Khama supported devolving power to the chiefs in the name of restoring discipline and traditional morality. He issued a directive that increased the legal drinking age to 21, empowered minor tribal leaders to order floggings, created mephato groups to be vigilantes, and reintroduced corporal punishment in schools. Several newly installed chiefs endorsed this policy and implemented stricter punishments for wrongdoers. Among these was Kgafela II, chief of the Kgatla people. To enforce traditional morality among his people, he significantly increased the use of flogging for those who violated the law. Kgafela and others involved were criminally charged for misusing the punishment in 2010, and the court dismissed his claim of immunity, determining that chiefs lack sovereignty and are subject to the constitution.

As the BDP chose its party leadership in 2009, Khama appointed numerous A-Team figures to party sub-committees despite the victory of the Barata-Phathi during the party's congress. When the party's secretary general Gomolemo Motswaledi consulted with lawyers to question the legality of Khama's actions, Khama had him suspended from the committee. After taking the issue to court, it was found that the incumbent president is immune from legal prosecution, and Khama suspended Motswaledi from the BDP entirely. In early 2010, Khama suspended and then expelled several other members of the Barata-Phathi faction from the BDP. This led to the BDP's first major split in March when the Barata-Phathi faction left the party to form the Botswana Movement of Democracy.

The Public Service Act took effect in 2010, legalising strikes for civil servants under some circumstances. The following year, the Botswana Federation of Public Sector Unions (BOFEPUSU) led a two-month strike among the nation's civil service to demand a 16% pay raise, and the government responded by removing thousands of employees from their positions. The removals were overseen by Mokgweetsi Masisi, the Minister for Presidential Affairs. To oppose the government's position, BOFEPUSU facilitated a merger of major opposition parties into the Umbrella for Democratic Change (UDC). This new group was led by Duma Boko, who had taken charge of the BNF in 2010 and moderated its rhetoric.

Khama implemented strong conservation reforms during his presidency, especially regarding hunting. While applauded internationally and forming the reputation of Botswana as a "green miracle", they were met with frustration domestically because of the unilateral top-down means they were implemented through, especially from those living in the designated conservation areas. These policies included an escalation of military anti-poaching practices; anti-poaching units were equipped with automatic firearms to complement a shoot-to-kill policy against suspected poachers.

The BDP retained its majority in the legislature after the following election, but for the first time it did so with only a plurality of the popular vote. Ian Khama then appointed Masisi as his vice-president. The decision was controversial because of Masisi's inexperience relative to other possible choices. According to Mogae, Masisi was chosen with the understanding that he would appoint Tshekedi Khama II as vice-president after taking the presidency himself. Botsalo Ntuane was elected Secretary General of the BDP in 2015 on a platform of anti-corruption and electoral reform. This threatened the entrenched nature of the BDP, and Ntuane found a political rival in Masisi. Khama was hostile to the press, especially toward outlets that disagreed with his administration's actions. He had two journalists charged with sedition in 2017, but the charges were later dropped.

=== Presidency of Mokgweetsi Masisi ===
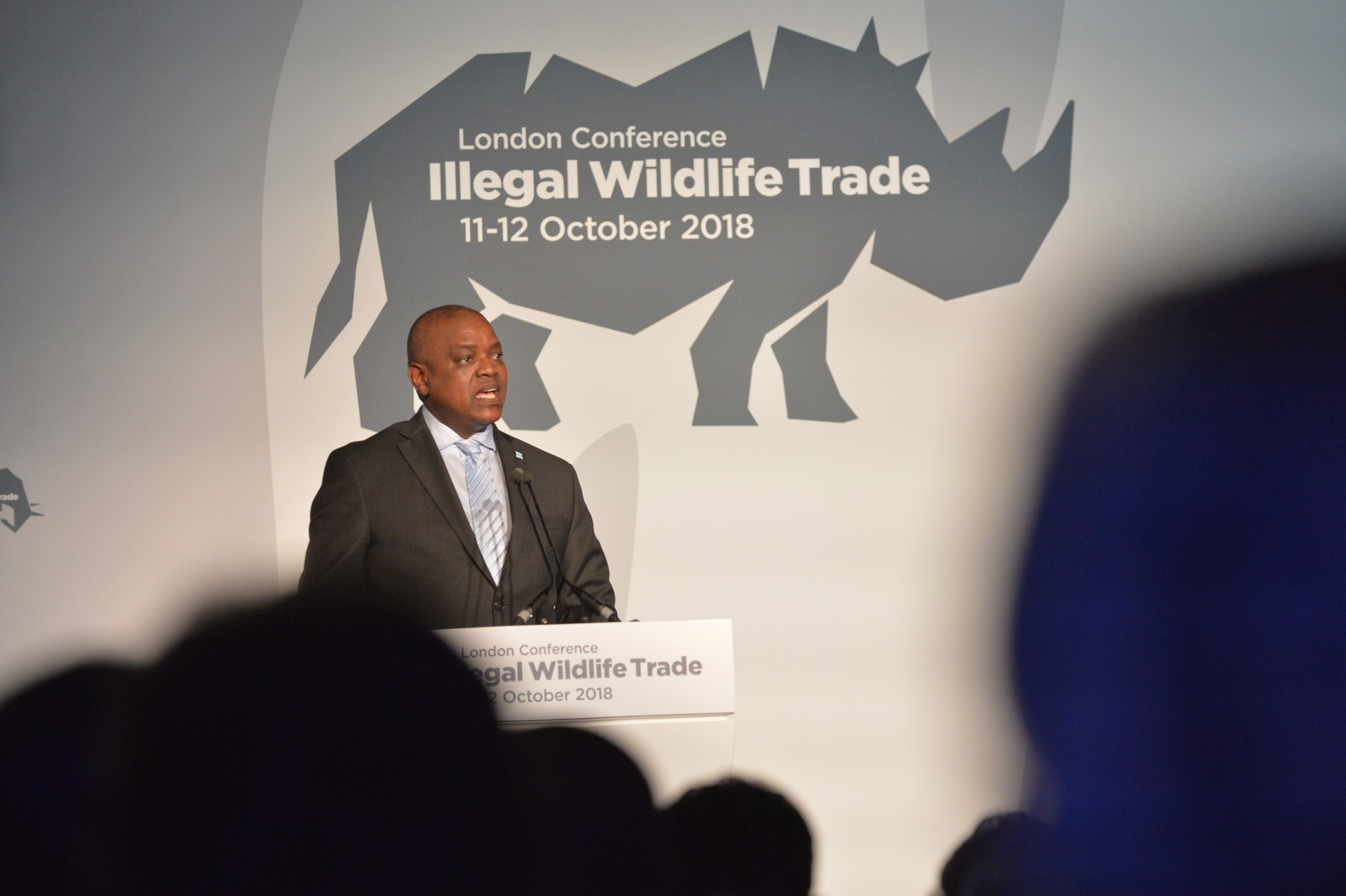
Mokgweetsi Masisi speaking at a conference on the illegal wildlife trade in London in 2018

Masisi became president at the end of Khama's term on 1 April 2018. As the 2019 general election approached, Masisi developed an image to contrast himself from Khama, presenting himself as an anti-corruption figure while supporting the media and BOFEPUSU. His anti-corruption drive resulted in the arrest of Isaac Kgosi, who had led the Directorate of Intelligence and Security in Khama's administration.

Masisi proceeded to reverse many of Khama's policies. Among these were the repeal of conservation policies, including a controversial hunting ban that targeted the ivory trade. He also oversaw the decriminalisation of homosexuality. As this developed, Masisi and Khama became rivals instead of allies. Khama attempted to recruit Pelonomi Venson-Moitoi as an alternative BDP candidate against Masisi, and when that failed, he founded his own party, the Botswana Patriotic Front (BPF).

The BDP reclaimed a majority of the popular vote in 2019, but the election was marred by government pressure and occasional raids against opposition figures. The UDC challenged the results, but they were unsuccessful. Regional trends shifted in 2019 as the BDP lost some of its support in the north while increasing its influence in the south. The election also saw the primary opposition party, the BNF, lose ground to the BCP.

Like most nations, Botswana saw major economic decline during the COVID-19 pandemic, and the country stayed in lockdown for much of 2020 and 2021. The SARS-CoV-2 Omicron variant was discovered in Botswana later in 2021. Anti-Indian sentiment became widespread as the Indian community in Botswana was relatively wealthy.

Khama fled to South Africa in exile in November 2021, and the government of Botswana charged him with illegal ownership of weapons soon after.

=== Presidency of Duma Boko ===
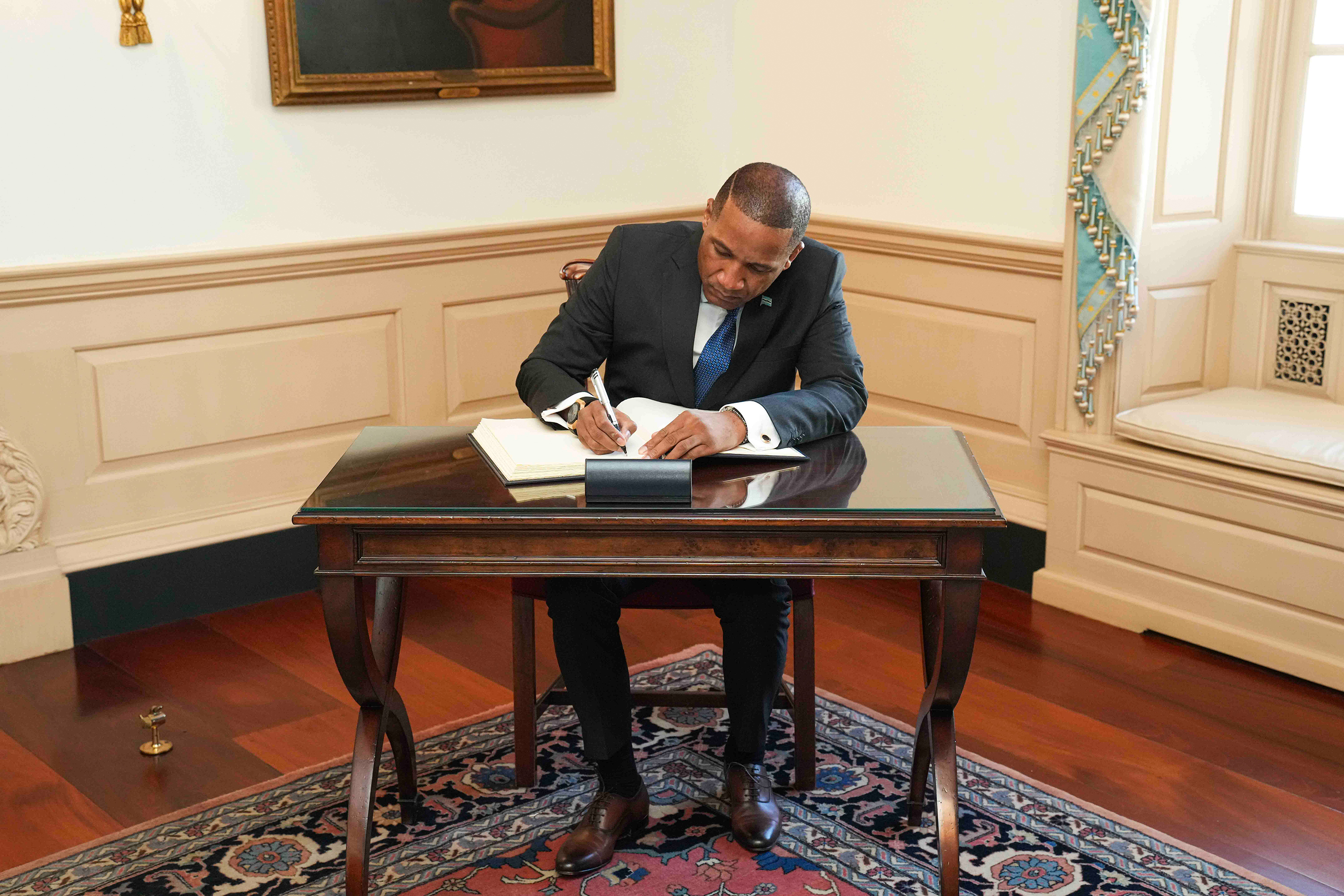
Duma Boko signing an agreement with the United States in 2025

The Umbrella for Democratic Change (UDC) became the first opposition party in Botswana to take power following its victory in the 2024 general election, ending 58 years of rule by the Botswana Democratic Party (BDP). In his first State of the Nation Address in November 2024, Duma Boko said that his government would push for increased investment into solar energy, medicinal cannabis and industrial hemp. He also announced engagements with Elon Musk to extend affordable internet access nationwide through Starlink. In March 2025, Botswana launched its first satellite, the BOTSAT‑1, into space. Boko attended the satellite's launch, which took place at SpaceX facilities in the United States.

On 7 August 2025, Boko joined the Advisory Board of the Global Center on Adaptation. On 25 August 2025, Boko declared a nationwide public health emergency due to the 2025 medical crisis caused by the shortages of medicine and supplies in hospitals caused by budget shortfalls and reduction of aid from the United States. Following the crisis, Duma Boko stated that the country's healthcare system would see numerous reforms to prevent a similar crisis from happening in the future. Reforms included a restructuring of the national medicines procurement body, the expansion of public medicine, and the creation of a national health intelligence centre. Additionally, Boko stated that the African Continental Free Trade Area would help expand regional pharmaceutical industries.

== See also ==
- Bibliography of Botswana
- Culture of Botswana
- Demographics of Botswana
- Economy of Botswana
- Geography of Botswana
- History of Africa
- History of Southern Africa
- History of Gaborone
- List of Botswana-related topics
- List of years in Botswana
- Outline of Botswana
- Timeline of Botswana
- Timeline of Gaborone
- Politics of Botswana
