= Agisanyang Mosimanegape =

Motswana footballer

Personal information
- Full name: Agisanyang Mosimanegape
- Date of birth: 29 December 1978 (age 47)
- Place of birth: Botswana
- Position: Defender

Team information
- Current team: TAFIC

Senior career*
| Years | Team | Apps | (Gls) |
| 1996–2007 | TAFIC | | |
| 2007 | Notwane | | |

International career
| 1997–2002 | Botswana | 8 | (0) |
- * Club domestic league appearances and goals

Agisanyang Mosimanegape (born 29 December 1978) is a Motswana former footballer who played as a defender. He played for the Botswana national football team between 1997 and 2002.
