= Timeline of Botswana =

The history of Botswana, a country located in Southern Africa, includes its pre-state history, its colonial period as the Bechuanaland Protectorate (1885–1966), and its modern history as a sovereign state from 30 September 1966 onwards.

== Pre-statehood ==
=== Early history ===
- c. 73000 BCE – Humans settle in present-day Botswana.
- c. 1000 – Ancestors of the Kalanga people and the Sotho-Tswana peoples migrate to present-day Botswana.
- c. 1400 – Ancestors of the Kgalagadi people and Yeyi people migrate to present-day Botswana.
- c. 1450 – The Kingdom of Butua is established by the Chibundule dynasty of the Kalanga people.
- c. 1500 – Ancestors of the Tswana people, Subia people, Birwa people, and Pedi people migrate to present-day Botswana.
- c. 1650 – Ancestors of the Kwena people migrate to present-day Botswana.
- c. 1680 – Nichasike overthrows the Chinbundule dynasty and seizes power in the Kingdom of Butua.
- c. 1730 – The Ngwaketse people split from the Kwena people.
- c. 1750 – The Ngwato people split from the Kwena people.
- c. 1795 – The Tawana people split from the Ngwato people.

=== 19th century ===
- 1824
  - July – Robert Moffat of the London Missionary Society makes contact with the Ngwaketse people.
- 1825 – Sebetwane of the Kololo people leads attacks against the Kwena and Ngwaketse peoples.
- 1826
  - 28 August – Sebego I of the Ngwaketse people defeats the Kololo people at Dithubaruba.
- c. 1828 – The Kingdom of Butua defeats the Ngwato people at Matopos.
- 1835 – The Kololo people defeat the Tawana people.
- 1841
  - July – David Livingstone of the London Missionary Society begins missionary work among the Tswana people.
- 1842 – The Northern Ndebele people of present-day Zimbabwe attack the Kwena people, Kgafela Kgatla, and Ngwato people. Macheng, heir to the Ngwato chiefdom, is taken prisoner.
- 1844
  - The Ngwato people use firearms to repel the Northern Ndebele people at Shoshong.
  - Two rival groups emerge among the Ngwaketse people after the death of Sebego I.
- 1848
  - 1 October – David Livingstone baptises Sechele I of the Kwena people, who becomes head of the local church.
- 1852
  - The Batswana–Boer War begins.
  - The Tlôkwa people, Lete people, Hurutshe people, Mmanaana Kgatla, and Rolong people migrate to present-day Botswana.
  - 30 August – The Kwena people repel an invasion by the Transvaal Republic in the Battle of Dimawe.
- 1853
  - January – Transvaal and the Kwena people come to a peace agreement. The Kwena people carry out guerrilla warfare for another three years.
  - June – The Ngwaketse people rejoin under the joint leadership of Gaseitsiwe and Senthufe.
- 1857
  - Gaseitsiwe overthrows Senthufe and takes control of the Ngwaketse people.
  - 16 July – Lutheran missionaries begin evangelising to the Kwena people.
  - November – Robert Moffat negotiates the release of Macheng. Sechele I makes him kgosi of the Ngwato people.
- 1859
  - April – Sechele I has Macheng overthrown and makes Sekgoma I the kgosi of the Ngwato people.
- 1863
  - March – The Ngwato people repel another attack by the Northern Ndebele people at Shoshong.
- 1866
  - May – Macheng is reinstated as kgosi of the Ngwato people replacing Sekgoma I.
- 1867
  - 4 December – The Tati Goldfields are discovered by Karl Mauch, causing a gold rush over the next two years.
- 1870
  - April – Transvaal military leader Harklaas Malan captures Kgamanyane, kgosi of the Kgafela Kgatla, and publicly whips him.
  - November – The Kgatla people join the Kwena people under the rule of Sechele I.
- 1871
  - May – Mochudi is founded when the Kgatla people migrate to the Kingdom of Kwena.
- 1872
  - 29 August – Macheng is banished from Shoshong in an effort organised by Khama III.
- 1873
  - January – Sekgoma I returns as kgosi of the Ngwato people.
  - January – A schism occurs between brothers Khama III, a Christian, and Kgamane, who joined and renounced Christianity. Khama III flees to Serowe.
- 1875
  - Khama III overthrows Sekgoma I and becomes kgosi of the Ngwato people.
  - 11 August – The Kgafela people win the first battle of the Kwena–Kgafela War against the Kwena people in Mochudi.
  - November – The Kwena people win a battle against the Kgatla people in Thamaga.
- 1876
  - July – The Kwena people win a battle against the Kgatla people in Molepolole.
  - August – In response to the Dorsland Trek, Khama III requests British protection of the region.
- 1877 – The Dorsland Trek migrates through present-day Botswana.
- 1881
  - November – Ikaneng leads the Lete people in repelling an invasion.
- 1883 – The Kwena–Kgafela War ends. The Rolong, Ngwaketse, Kwena, and Kgatla peoples form a defense pact.
- 1884 – The Tawana people repel an invasion of Khutiyabasadi by the Northern Ndebele people.

== Bechuanaland Protectorate (1885–1966) ==
=== 1885–1889 ===
- 1885
  - 27 January – The United Kingdom of Great Britain and Ireland declares a protectorate over the Tswana people during the Berlin Conference, creating the Bechuanaland Protectorate.
- 1887
  - May – The Ngwato people and British police expel the Seleka people from Ngwapa to Transvaal.
- 1889
  - 5 February – Tswana leaders denounce Khama III's decision to invite British rule.
  - October – The British South Africa Company is granted a charter that will allow operation in the Bechuanaland Protectorate.

=== 1890–1899 ===
- 1890
  - The United Kingdom places the Bechuanaland Protectorate under the Foreign Jurisdictions Act.
  - The United Kingdom extends the Bechuanaland Protectorate to the Chobe River.
- 1891
  - 9 May – Sekgoma Letsholathebe becomes regent of the Tswana people in place of Khama III.
- 1892
  - January – The first of the Ngwato people enrol at Lovedale College.
  - September – Sechele I dies. He is succeeded as kgosi of the Kwena people by Sebele I.
  - September – Kgosi Mosinyi II of the Kaa people dies, causing a succession crisis.
- 1893
  - October – The British South Africa Company, British police, and the Ngwato people attack and conquer the Northern Ndebele people.
- 1894
  - January – Sekgoma Letsholathebe leads an attack on the Caprivi Strip to steal slaves and cattle.
  - October – The United Kingdom reorganises territorial allotment in the Bechuanaland Protectorate to favour Khama III.
- 1895 – The United Kingdom splits the Bechuanaland Protectorate, merging the southern British Bechuanaland with Cape Colony, which would become present-day South Africa. Tswana chiefs and British missionaries form a coalition to speak against further absorption of Tswana tribes into Cape colony.
- 1896 – The 1890s African rinderpest epizootic reaches the Bechuanaland Protectorate, killing 90% of the protectorate's cattle and causing a years-long famine.
- 1897
  - Francistown is founded.
  - October – Khama III exiles his heir, Sekgoma Khama.
  - 19 October – The Mahikeng–Bulawayo Railroad finishes construction.
- 1898 – Samuel Moroka leads his followers to settle in Tati.
- 1899
  - The borders of Batswana reserves are defined.
  - April – The United Kingdom imposes a hut tax on the protectorate.
  - 25 November – The Kgafela Kgatla win a battle against Boers at Derdepoort at the beginning of the Second Boer War.

=== 1900–1909 ===
- 1901
  - 27 April – Koranta ea Becoana is founded as the first Batswana-owned newspaper.
- 1903
  - The capital of the Mangwato tribe moves from Phalatswe to Serowe.
  - The Herero people and the Nama people begin migrating to the protectorate from German South West Africa to escape the Herero and Namaqua genocide.
- 1905
  - 29 March – Tiger Kloof Native Institution opens as a secondary school.
- 1906
  - 12 June – The protectorate's resident commissioner overthrows and imprisons regent Tawana kgosi Sekgoma Letsholathebe.
- 1909
  - Several Tswana tribes are made part of the newly formed Union of South Africa. The United Kingdom confirms that the Bechuanaland Protectorate will not be merged into the union.
  - Rudolf Pöch produces the first film recording of present-day Botswana.

=== 1910–1919 ===
- 1910
  - 1 July – Ngwaketse kgosi Bathoen I dies.
- 1911
  - 23 January – Kwena kgosi Sebele I dies, causing a succession crisis.
  - April – Sekgoma Letsholathebe is released from prison.
- 1914 – The protectorate joins World War I with the United Kingdom, sending soldiers to France, East Africa, and Namibia.
- 1915
  - Maun is founded as the capital of the Batawana tribe.
  - Bobonong is founded as the capital of the Birwa tribe.
  - Thousands of the Rolong people migrate from South Africa to Tati.
- 1916
  - May – The Kwena Tribal Council is formed to govern the Kwena people.
  - 18 June – Moeapitso kills his brother Seepapitso II.
  - November – The resident commissioner disbands the Kwena Tribal Council.
- 1918
  - The Spanish flu reaches the Bechuanaland Protectorate.
  - 12 February – Kwena kgosi Sechele II dies. He is succeeded by Sebele II.
- 1919
  - July – The Native Advisory Council is established.
- 1920
  - 2 March – The European Advisory Council is established.
  - 24 December – The Birwa people are expelled from the Tuli Block and sent to Bobonong.

=== 1920–1929 ===
- 1923
  - 21 February – Mangwato kgosi Khama III dies.
- 1926
  - 19 January – Tshekedi Khama becomes regent kgosi of the Mangwato tribe.
- 1928
  - April – Bathoen II becomes kgosi of the Ngwaketse tribe.
- 1929
  - November – Molefi becomes kgosi of the Kgafela Kgatla, replacing regent Isang Pilane.

=== 1930–1939 ===
- 1930 – Charles Rey is appointed resident commissioner of the protectorate.
- 1931
  - 7 May – Charles Rey overthrows Kwena kgosi Sebele II and banishes him to Ghanzi.
- 1933
  - 8 April – Kgosi Gobuamang surrenders to the British.
  - August – Charles Rey suspends Ngwato regent Tshekedi Khama after he has a European flogged.
- 1936
  - 30 October – Charles Rey suspends Kgafela Kgatla kgosi Molefi and reinstates regent Isang Pilane.
- 1937 – Charles Rey ends his tenure as resident commissioner. He is replaced by Charles Arden-Clarke.
- 1939 – The protectorate enters World War II, with 10,000 Batswana serving in the African Auxiliary Pioneer Corps.

=== 1940–1949 ===
- 1941 – Kgafela Kgatla regent Isang Pilane dies.
- 1942 – Kgafela Kgatla regent Mmusi joins the African Auxiliary Pioneer Corps, and the Zion Christian Church establishes a ruling council over Kgafela Kgatla.
- 1944 – Naledi Ya Batswana begins publication through government subsidies.
- 1945
  - Moremi III is suspended as kgosi of the Tawana people.
  - Molefi is restored as kgosi of Kgafela Kgatla.
- 1946
  - Tawana kgosi Moremi III dies.
- 1947
  - February – Elizabeth Pulane Moremi is appointed as the Tawana regent.
  - September – The Ngwato people attack the village led by John Nswazwi, forcing him to flee the protectorate.
- 1948 – Seretse Khama, heir to the Mangwato tribe, controversially marries Ruth Williams, a white British woman. The United Kingdom banishes Khama from the Bechuanaland Protectorate.
- 1949
  - 25 June – The Mangwato tribe endorses the marriage of Seretse Khama and Ruth Williams during a kgotla. Regent Tshekedi Khama, who did not wish to endorse the marriage, leaves the tribe.
  - 6 December – The Bechuanaland Protectorate takes direct control over the Ngwato tribe rather than allowing Seretse Khama to rule.

=== 1950–1959 ===
- 1951
  - 20 September – Tawana secretary Leetile Disang Raditladi is escorted out of Ngamiland by gunmen.
- 1952
  - The Bamangwato National Congress forms to represent Seretse Khama. Riots take place in protest of his exile.
  - 11 September – A 6.1 magnitude earthquake occurs in Botswana.
  - 11 October – A 6.7 magnitude earthquake occurs in Botswana.
- 1953
  - 13 May – Rasebolai Kgamane is placed in charge of the Ngwato Reserve.
- 1956
  - Seretse Khama is permitted to return to Botswana after renouncing his claim to the Ngwato tribe. Seretse Khama and Tshekedi Khama both renounce their claims in favour of creating the Ngwato Tribal Council that limits the kgosi. Similar councils were adopted by other tribes soon afterward.
  - 9 October – Rasebolai Kgamane becomes the Ngwato kgosi.
- 1957
  - September – Elections are held to create democratic local councils.
- 1958
  - The first tarred road in Botswana is paved in Lobatse.
  - British advisory councils request the creation of a legislature for the protectorate.
- 1959
  - Copper mines are created in the Bechuanaland Protectorate.
  - April – The Bechuanaland Protectorate Federal Party is established by Leetile Disang Raditladi.
  - 2 June – Bamangwato Concessions Limited is founded by Tshekedi Khama and Rhodesian Selection Trust.
  - June – Tshekedi Khama dies.

=== 1960–1966 ===
- 1960
  - 6 December – The Bechuanaland People's Party is founded by Mpho and K. T. Motsete.
- 1961
  - A provisional constitution comes into effect for the Bechuanaland Protectorate. Seretse Khama is appointed to the executive council.
  - The Central Kalahari Game Reserve is established.
- 1962 – The Bechuanaland Democratic Party is founded by Seretse Khama.
- 1963
  - A constitutional conference is held to begin drafting the Constitution of Botswana.
  - August – Construction begins at Gaborone to create a new capital.
- 1965
  - The National Development Bank of Botswana is established.
  - February – The capital of the Bechuanaland Protectorate is moved from Mafikeng, South Africa, to Gaborone.
  - 1 March – The Bechuanaland Democratic Party wins most contests in the 1965 Bechuanaland general election.
  - 9 March – Seretse Khama is made prime minister and the Bechuanaland Protectorate is granted self-governance.
  - September – The Botswana National Front is founded by Kenneth Koma.

== Republic of Botswana (1966–present) ==
=== 1966–1969 ===
- 1966
  - 30 September – The Bechuanaland Protectorate is granted independence as Botswana. Seretse Khama is chosen as the first president of Botswana by the National Assembly.
  - 17 October – Botswana is admitted to the United Nations.
  - The Botswana National Stadium opens.
- 1967
  - July – Diamonds are discovered in Orapa.
  - 29 September – The Mineral Rights in Tribal Territories Act and the Mines and Minerals Act grant the government control over mining.
- 1968
  - The Tribal Land Act is passed, moving power over land allocation from the kgosis to land boards.
- 1969
  - Bathoen II leaves the Botswana Democratic Party and resigns his status as kgosi of the Ngwaketse to join the Botswana National Front.
  - 23 June – The Debswana mining company is established.
  - 18 October – The first national election of Botswana is held. The Botswana Democratic Party is challenged by the Botswana National Front but maintains its majority.
  - December – Selebi-Phikwe is founded.

=== 1970–1979 ===
- 1970
  - The Botswana Development Corporation is established.
  - January – The power to allocate tribal land is transferred from the kgosis to independent land boards under the Tribal Land Act.
- 1971
  - 1 July – The Orapa diamond mine is established.
- 1974
  - 26 October – The 1974 Botswana general election is held. The Botswana Democratic Party maintains its majority.
- 1975
  - The Selebi-Phikwe mine opens.
  - The Tribal Grazing Lands Policy is established.
- 1976
  - Kimberlite diamonds are discovered in Jwaneng.
  - 23 August – The Bank of Botswana is established. The Botswana pula replaces the South African rand as Botswana's official currency.
- 1977
  - January – The United Nations passes a resolution demanding that Rhodesian forces end their hostilities along the Botswana–Rhodesia border.
  - 15 April – The Botswana Defence Force is established.
- 1979
  - 13 April – The Gaborone–Francistown Highway is completed.
  - 20 October – The 1979 Botswana general election is held. The Botswana Democratic Party maintains its majority.

=== 1980–1989 ===
- 1980
  - Botswana co-founds the Southern African Development Coordination Conference.
  - 13 July – Seretse Khama dies. He is succeeded as president by Quett Masire.
- 1981 – A drought in Southern Africa begins, destroying approximately 75% of crops in Botswana. It will continue until 1987.
- 1982
  - The Financial Assistance Policy is implemented to provide grants for businesses.
  - February – The Jwaneng diamond mine is established.
  - June – The Botswana Progressive Union is founded.
  - September – The University of Botswana is founded.
- 1983
  - 3 January – Vice President Lenyeletse Seretse dies. Peter Mmusi becomes vice president.
  - A labour law is passed limiting the right to unionise.
- 1984
  - The Sir Seretse Khama International Airport opens.
  - May – The Public Service Act allows civil servants to operate in the private sector.
  - 8 September – The 1984 Botswana general election is held. The Botswana Democratic Party maintains its majority.
- 1985
  - 1985 – HIV is first identified in Botswana, beginning the nation's HIV epidemic.
  - 14 June – South African soldiers invade Botswana and attack the headquarters of a South African anti-apartheid group in Gaborone. 12 people are killed, and the action is condemned in a resolution by the United Nations.
- 1986
  - 17 April – Botswana's first women's rights group, Emang Basadi, is established.
- 1987
  - A referendum is held to form a Supervisor of Elections. It passes with 78.1% of the vote.
  - The university is closed for several months in response to student protests against police misconduct.
  - May – Morupule Electric Power Station is established.
  - 1 October – Botswana Railways is established.
  - November – The constitution is amended so that only citizens of Botswana can serve as president.
- 1989
  - Free secondary education is made available in Botswana.
  - 7 October – The 1989 Botswana general election is held. The Botswana Democratic Party maintains its majority.

=== 1990–1999 ===
- 1990 – Namibia is established as an independent country to the west of Botswana, giving the country another route to the ocean beside South Africa.
- 1991
  - Sowa Soda Ash Works is established.
  - 12,000 public sector employees are removed from their positions for engaging in strike action.
- 1992
  - March – Peter Mmusi steps down as vice president amid scandal. He is replaced by Festus Mogae.
  - 3 July – A ruling is made in favour of Unity Dow in Attorney General of Botswana v. Unity Dow.
- 1993
  - The Pula Fund, a sovereign wealth fund, is established.
  - The human rights group Ditshwanelo is founded.
- 1994
  - Apartheid in neighbouring South Africa ends.
  - 11 July – The Directorate on Corruption and Economic Crime is established following several corruption scandals.
  - 15 October – The 1994 Botswana general election is held. The Botswana Democratic Party maintains its majority.
  - 6 November – The Murder of Segametsi Mogomotsi as part of a ritual killing prompts riots.
- mid-1990s – The government of Botswana adopts a policy of forced displacement against the San people.
- 1995
  - 16 February – The parliament building and downtown Gaborone are attacked by students.
- 1996 – Universal pensions are established.
- 1997
  - The Vision 2016 economic plan is launched.
  - Botho University is founded.
  - April – Omang national identity cards are introduced.
  - October – A referendum is held to create the Independent Electoral Commission, to lower the voting age to 18, to set term limits on the presidency, and to allow automatic succession of the vice president in the event of a presidential vacancy. All three motions pass.
- 1998
  - 31 March – President Quett Masire retires. He is succeeded as president by Festus Mogae.
  - 20 June – The Botswana Congress Party is founded by Michael Dingake.
  - 13 July – Ian Khama becomes vice president.
  - September – Botswana joins South Africa in an invasion of Lesotho to quell a military insurrection.
  - The LGBT rights group LEGABIBO is founded.
- 1999
  - 17 May – Yarona FM becomes the first private radio station in Botswana.
  - September – A state of emergency is declared for six days following issues with voter registration.
  - 16 October – The 1999 Botswana general election is held. The Botswana Democratic Party maintains its majority. The Botswana Congress Party had acquired seats from members that left the Botswana National Front, but it loses most of these seats.
  - 13 December – The International Court of Justice rules that Botswana, not Namibia, has jurisdiction over Sedudu Island.

=== 2000–2009 ===
- 2000
  - February – Extensive flooding begins, displacing 60,000 people.
  - May – The Kgalagadi Transfrontier Park is established as a joint project between Botswana and South Africa.
  - 31 July – Botswana Television is established.
  - The Balopi Commission is established.
- 2001
  - April – The Botswana Federation of Trade Unions is established.
  - August – The San people are ordered to leave the Central Kalahari Game Reserve.
  - December – Tsodilo becomes a World Heritage Site.
  - A referendum is held to enact various judicial reforms. All seven motions pass.
  - Ngamiland District and Chobe District merge to form North-West District.
- 2002
  - February – Botswana begins forcibly evicting the San people from the Central Kalahari Game Reserve.
  - March – A court case challenging the removal of the San people is dismissed.
  - July – Botswana adopts a value-added tax.
  - October – Botswana and South Africa jointly establish a reservation for the Khomani San and Mier peoples.
- 2003
  - The Serowe Stadium opens.
  - September – Botswana begins construction of a border fence along the border with Zimbabwe to prevent illegal immigration.
  - October – The Botswana Democratic Party begins holding primary elections for the first time.
- 2004
  - August – A strike among diamond miners ends with approximately one thousand workers losing their jobs when a court determines that the strike was illegal.
  - 30 October – The 2004 Botswana general election is held. The Botswana Democratic Party maintains its majority.
- 2005
  - September – Women are permitted to enlist in the Botswana Defence Force.
  - October – The government of Botswana expels all but 250 of the San people from the Central Kalahari Game Reserve.
  - The Three Dikgosi Monument is inaugurated.
- 2006
  - December – The courts find that the forced displacement of the San people is unconstitutional.
- 2007 – Uranium deposits are discovered in Botswana.
- 2008
  - The Public Service Act of 2008 allows the creation of the labour union BOFEPUSU.
  - March – The Diamond Trading Company Botswana is established.
  - April – Ian Khama becomes President of Botswana.
- 2009
  - 16 October – The 2009 Botswana general election is held. The Botswana Democratic Party maintains its majority.

=== 2010–2019 ===
- 2010
  - The Botswana Movement for Democracy splits from the Botswana Democratic Party.
  - The first annual Gaborone Marathon is held.
  - July – The Basarwa people are ordered to cease drilling for water.
- 2011
  - BOFEPUSU leads a strike among public employees. The government grants a 3% raise rather than the requested 16% raise.
  - January – The order enforcing a ban on water drilling against the Basarwa people is overturned by an appeals court.
- 2012
  - June – Botswana is connected to Fiber-optic Internet.
  - 9 August – Botswana wins its first Olympic medal when Nijel Amos wins a silver in the men's 800 metres.
  - 9 August – The Diamond Trading Center is established.
  - 16 October – The Botswana High Court affirms that women have the right to inherit property.
  - The Umbrella for Democratic Change alliance of political parties is founded.
- 2013
  - 1 April – The Botswana Communications Regulatory Authority is established.
  - November – De Beers relocates its headquarters from London to Gaborone.
- 2014
  - January – A ban on hunting is implemented.
  - July – Opposition leader Gomolemo Motswaledi is killed in a car crash, prompting theories that the government was involved.
  - 24 October – The 2014 Botswana general election is held. The Botswana Democratic Party maintains its majority but fails to get a majority of the popular vote for the first time in its history.
  - November – Mokgweetsi Masisi is appointed vice president.
  - 14 November – LEGABIBO wins legal recognition.
- 2015
  - November – The Lesedi La Rona is discovered at the Karowe mine.
- 2016
  - April – The High Court rules that same-sex marriage is legal.
  - The Selebi-Phikwe mine enters into a receivership.
- 2017
  - A United Kingdom, a British biopic of Seretse Khama and Ruth Williams, popularises their story with an international release.
  - 3 April – A 6.5 magnitude earthquake occurs in the Central District.
  - October – The Alliance for Progressives splits from the Botswana Movement for Democracy.
- 2018
  - April – Mokgweetsi Masisi becomes President of Botswana.
- 2019
  - The Botswana Patriotic Front splits from the Botswana Democratic Party to support former president Ian Khama.
  - The 2019 Botswana general election is held. The Botswana Democratic Party maintains its majority.

=== 2020–present ===
- 2020
  - 27 July – The Rediscover Botswana domestic tourism campaign is launched to limit economic effects of COVID-19.
  - 4 November – Anti-poaching forces kill four men on the Botswana–Namibia border, causing a diplomatic incident between the countries.
