= Odirile Gaolebale =

Motswana footballer

Personal information
- Full name: Odirile Gaolebale
- Date of birth: 14 November 1978 (age 47)
- Place of birth: Botswana
- Position: Goalkeeper

Senior career*
Years	Team	Apps	(Gls)
1999–2001	Defence Force		

International career
2000	Botswana	3	(0)
- * Club domestic league appearances and goals

Odirile Gaolebale (born 14 November 1978) is a Botswana retired footballer who played as goalkeeper. He had three international appearances for the Botswana national football team, including one World Cup Qualifier, coming on as substitute for Phineas Maimela in the 26th minute of a 1–0 loss to Zambia in a World Cup qualifier on 22 April 2000.
