= Ditaola Ditaola =

Motswana footballer

Personal information
- Full name: Ditaola Ditaola
- Date of birth: 23 August 1978 (age 48)
- Place of birth: Botswana
- Position: Striker

Senior career*
Years	Team	Apps	(Gls)
1997–	Police XI		

International career
1998–2002	Botswana	4	(1)
- * Club domestic league appearances and goals

Ditaola Ditaola (born 23 August 1978) is a Motswana former footballer. He played for the Botswana national football team between 1998 and 2002.
