= Jackson Mutero Chirenje =

Zimbabwean historian (1935-1988)

- Born: July 10, 1935; Mudzimuirema, Chihota, Rhodesia
- Died: September 23, 1988 (aged 53)
- Education: Boston University, Bachelor of Arts; University of California, Los Angeles, Master of Arts; University of London, PhD
- Occupations: Professor of African studies, historian

Jackson Mutero Chirenje (July 10, 1935 – September 23, 1988) was a Zimbabwean historian. He was born in Mudzimuirema, Chihota, Rhodesia. He served as Secretary of the African Teachers' Union of Rhodesia in 1961. He received a B.A. in history from Boston University, an M.A. in history from the University of California at Los Angeles and a PhD. in history from University of London. He taught African history, African philosophy and Afro-American history at Harvard University. He was a senior lecturer and chairman of the history department at the University of Zimbabwe.

== Bibliography ==
- A History of Northern Botswana 1850-1910, Fairleigh-Dickinson University Press, 1977, ISBN 0-8386-1537-6
- A History of Zimbabwe for primary schools, Longman Zimbabwe, July 26, 1982
- Chief Kgama and His Times, 1835-1923: The Story of a Southern African Ruler, Rex Collings, 1978, ISBN 0-8603-6062-8
- Church, State, and Education in Bechuanaland in the Nineteenth Century, The International Journal of African Historical Studies, Vol. 9, No. 3 (1976), pp. 401–418
- Chief Sekgoma Letsholathebe II: Rebel or 20th Century Tswana Nationalist?, Botswana Notes and Records, Vol. 3 (1971), pp. 64–69
- Ethiopianism and Afro-Americans in Southern Africa, 1883-1916, Louisiana State University Press, ISBN 0-8071-1319-0
- Military and Political Aspects of Map-making in Ngamiland: A Rejoinder to Anthony Sillery's Comment, Botswana Notes and Records, Vol. 9 (1977), pp. 157–159
- Portuguese Priests and Soldiers in Zimbabwe, 1560-1572: The Interplay between Evangelism and Trade, The International Journal of African Historical Studies, Vol. 6, No. 1 (1973), pp. 36–48
- Zimbabwe: The Ordeal of a Frontline State in Southern Africa, University of Zimbabwe, 1987
