= Tati Goldfields =

Coordinates: 21°06′00″S 27°41′50″E

The Tati Goldfields are a mineral-rich band in Botswana and Zimbabwe in southern Africa. The band runs approximately 130 kilometres (81 mi) long by 5 kilometres (3 mi) wide, and crosses the Tati River. It is the southernmost of the gold-bearing bands in the Archaen greenstone (schist) belts of Zimbabwe. It is estimated that between 1866 and 1963 over 200,000 ounces of gold were produced from mines in the Tati Goldfields.

== History ==
The area along the Tati River was pit mined by the Bakalanga before the arrival of Europeans. It may have been one of the sources of wealth for the Great Zimbabwe empire (c. 1200 to 1450).

In 1866, Karl Mauch discovered the Tati goldfield, making it the first one discovered by Europeans in southern Africa. This led to the first South African gold rush.

== Geology ==
The gold mineralization occurs in quartz veins, intruded into the volcano-sedimentary rocks of the Tati greenstone belt. Other economic minerals occur including nickel and copper. The major formation is the Selkirk Formation which is up to 1000 meters thick. The Selkirk is composed mostly of redeposited dacite and rhyolite, with some darker volcanics, and minor quartzites and quartzitic schists.

== See also ==
- Francistown
- Mining industry of Botswana#Gold
- Tati Concessions Land
