= Murder of Segametsi Mogomotsi =

Murder case in Botswana

Segametsi Mogomotsi
- Born: 1979/1980
- Died: 6 November 1994 (aged 14)
- Cause of death: ritual murder
- Body discovered: Mochudi, Botswana
- Education: Radikolo Community Junior Secondary School

Segametsi Mogomotsi was a 14-year-old schoolgirl who was found murdered on 6 November 1994 in Mochudi, Botswana. She went missing sometime on 5 November, and her body was found naked and mutilated in an open space the next morning. The dipheko (medicine murder) sparked protests by the students at the Radikolo Community Junior Secondary School (RCJSS), the school where she attended, as well as among the citizens of Mochudi. The protests led to riots in neighbouring Gaborone, prompting the government of Botswana to call in Scotland Yard. No one has been formally charged with the murder, and an official police report was conducted, but as of August 2012, the results have not yet been released. The murder inspired the stories in Unity Dow's novel The Screaming of the Innocent, Michael Stanley's mystery Deadly Harvest, and Alexander McCall Smith's novel The No. 1 Ladies' Detective Agency.

== Background ==
So Segametsi was taken to a hill and a cloth was put in her mouth so she couldn't shout. She was killed by three men, and the one took the anus. The other parts were the breasts, vagina, and the tongue. She was heard crying during the night saying, "M., leave me alone, how can you kill me, I know you."

— An interviewee recalling the events

They picked this girl, who was a clever girl and a good student, because she was poor and they thought no one would make a fuss if she disappeared.

— A Form 5 student recounting the story of the murder

The ritual murder of a person whose body parts are cut off to make muti (medicine) that is used in ceremonies to promote business deals or success is common in Botswana. The British dealt with ritual murder cases when the country was still a protectorate as early as the 1930s, and social scientist Cyprian Fisiy has called witchcraft "the primary concern of most African communities". Children, especially highly educated students, are the primary targets of dipheko (rituals) because of their perceived potential for success. When social anthropologist Ørnulf Gulbrandsen interviewed several Batswana, one man said that, "we have no other way to explain how some people become rich overnight". Most accused people in cases of ritual murders recount either being possessed to murder or being threatened by future attacks through boloi (witchcraft) and thus were coerced to kill.

== Murder ==
In November 1996, anthropologist Charlanne Burke interviewed a student who summarised the murder:

Segametsi was selling oranges to raise money for a school trip. Some men came to her and bought all of her oranges, but they said they didn't have change so they would go to get it and come back. So Segametsi waited there all day and into the evening, till it was almost dark. Then some men came and grabbed her and put cotton … in her mouth, blindfolded her, and tied up her hands. They took her to a house in the bush …. This killer cut Segametsi into parts, putting arms and legs in piles according to the requests of the businessmen who had ordered the killing.

== Investigation ==
Segametsi's stepfather was arrested after confessing that he and other local businessmen killed the girl, but he retracted his statement, saying that the confession was really a second-hand account. While the named businessmen were arrested, they were released, sparking controversy in Mochudi. In 2008, Sekobye Mokgalo, one of the named businessmen, asked for government compensation for the wrongful conviction. In 2009, he received 10000,000 Botswana pula for damages from the government.

== Protests ==
In January 1995, students at Radikolo Community Junior Secondary School organized a march at the District Commissioner's office in Mochudi in response "perceived [...] government collusion in the practice of witchcraft". The march escalated into riots and protesters burned the house of the suspects. The violence continued in Gaborone starting on 16 February 1995. An ad hoc group, the Revolutionary War Council, pressed for justice "without [the] state's intervention." The Special Services Group, the riot police of the Botswana Defence Force, used tear gas on protesters in the central business district while students at the University of Botswana stormed an ongoing meeting of the National Assembly of Botswana. President Quett Masire issued a statement in response to the protests:

We shall not tolerate lawlessness, destruction of public and private property as well as unruly behaviour...Government has taken stern action to stamp out these unwelcome developments, so I have instructed the police and the army to restore law and order. Those who continue with such behaviour will regret.

Both rioters and police were injured: more than fifteen protesters were treated for rubber bullet wounds at the Deborah Relief Memorial Hospital, a small boy was killed and a bystander was paralyzed; both by police rubber bullets. A man was later executed by the police for the protests. The Botswana National Front Youth League criticized the government's response to the riots, saying that the military force was "not in keeping with democratic practice and may signal the emergence of a police/military state".

== See also ==
- List of unsolved murders (1980–1999)
