= Football in Botswana =

- Country: Botswana
- Governing body: Botswana Football Association
- National teams: Women's national football team Men's national football team
- Nicknames: The Zebras; The Mares;

International competitions
- Champions League; CAF Confederation Cup; Super Cup; FIFA Club World Cup; FIFA World Cup (Men's National Team); African Cup of Nations (National Teams)

Football is the number one sport in Botswana. It is organized by the Botswana Football Association. By October 2007, there are about 348 men's clubs registered. The number of woman's teams organized in the regional leagues by the season of 2021/22 is 88. The men's national team have not yet enjoyed any tangible success on the field. The women's team have achieved their greatest success by qualifying for the Africa Cup of Nations for the first time, where they've reached the first knockout stage. There are less than a handful of male and female players based outside of their home country, the most famous being forward Dipsy Selolwane.

== Men's League System ==
There are three main leagues: Botswana Premier League (16 clubs), Botswana First Division North (12 clubs), and Botswana First Division South (12 clubs).

== Women's League System ==
There are several regional leagues: Boteti Regional Women's League, Central North Women's League, Francistown Regional Women's League, Gaborone Women's League, Kgatleng Regional Women's League, Kweneng Regional Women's League, Nhabe Regional Women's League, Selebi Phikwe Regional Women's League, and Tswapong Regional Women's League.

Their champions are playing for the champion's title at the DTCB Women's Football Championship Tournament. Double Action is the record-winning club of the championship by 13 known wins. They also represented Botswana 2022 the second time at the CAF Women's Champions League. A lot of the clubs play at public or school grounds. With the season of 2022/23, the women's league once again have a big sponsor for a three-year period in form of the Diamond Trading Company Botswana (DTC).

== Men's National team ==
Main article: Botswana men's national football team

The men's national Team is ranked Place 148 at 2022.

== Women's national team ==
Main article: Botswana women's national football team

The women's national Team is ranked Place 151 at 2022.

== Attendances ==
The average attendance per top-flight football league season and the club with the highest average attendance:

Season	League average	Best club	Best club average
2023–24	537	Township Rollers	1,881

Source: League page on Wikipedia
