= Southern African Development Coordination Conference =

Flag of the SADCC

The Southern African Development Coordination Conference (SADCC), the forerunner of the Southern African Development Community (SADC), was a memorandum of understanding on common economic development signed in Lusaka, Zambia, on 1 April 1980. It is formalised as the Lusaka Declaration (entitled Southern Africa: Towards Economic Liberation) ratified by the nine signing states (Angola, Botswana, Lesotho, Malawi, Mozambique, Swaziland, Tanzania, Zambia, Zimbabwe). Some of the main goals for the Member States were to be less dependent on apartheid South Africa and to introduce programmes and projects which would influence the Southern African countries and whole region.

The Co-ordination Conference was a result of consultations in the late seventies. In May 1979 representatives of the Frontline States met in Gaborone and resolved that ministers of all member states should meet to discuss common economic development. This meeting materialised two months later in Arusha, where the formation of the SADCC was decided. The headquarters of the SADCC were located in Gaborone, Botswana, since 1982.

The Declaration and Treaty establishing the SADC, which replaced the Coordination Conference, was signed at the Summit of Heads of State or Government on 17 August 1992, in Windhoek, Namibia.
