= HIV/AIDS in Africa =

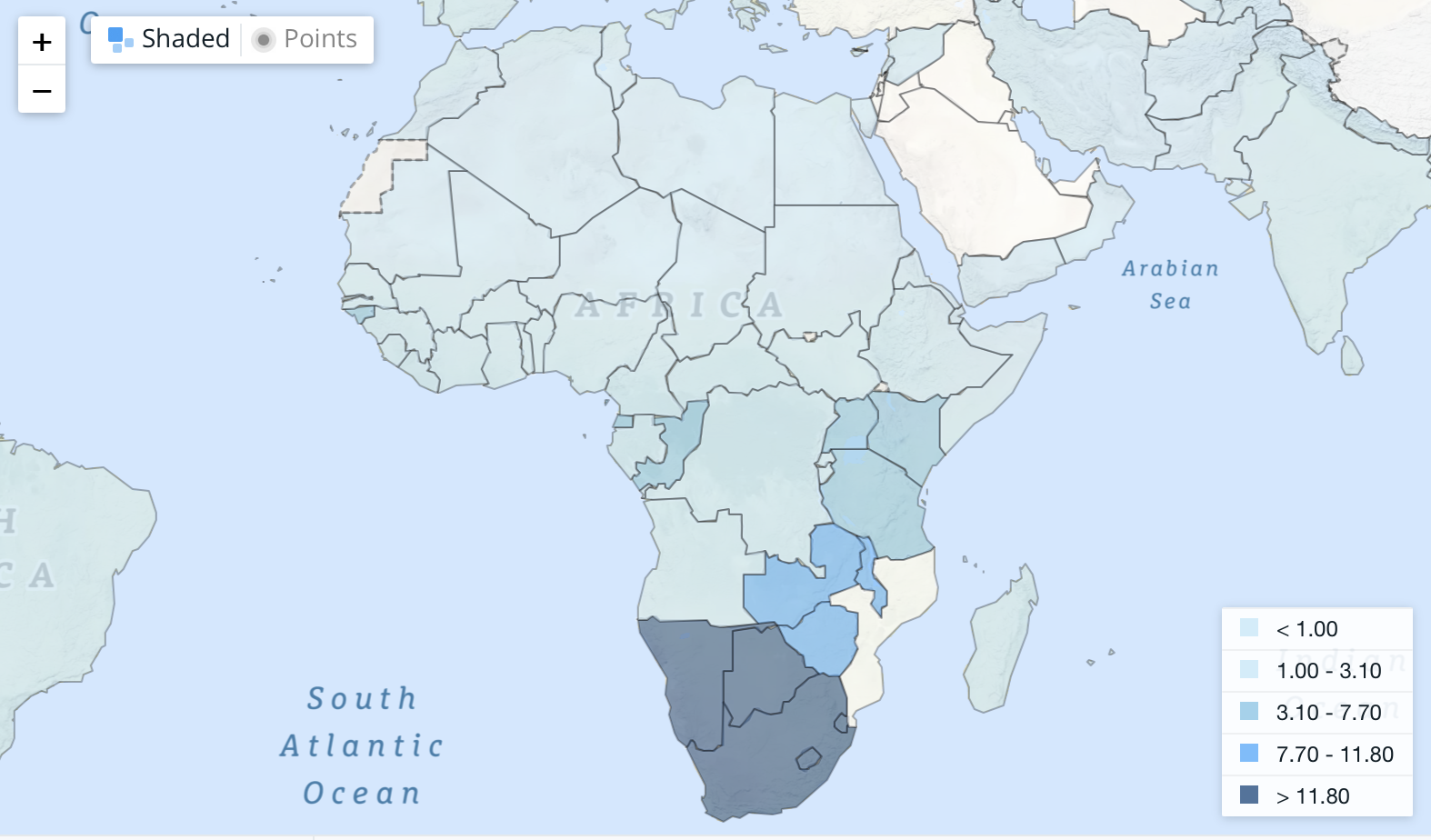
The 2026 prevalence of HIV/AIDS in Africa, % of population ages 15–49, World Bank

HIV/AIDS originated in the early 20th century and has become a major public health concern and cause of death in many countries. AIDS rates vary significantly between countries, with the majority of cases concentrated in Southern Africa. Although the continent is home to about 15.2 percent of the world's population, more than two-thirds of the total population infected worldwide – approximately 35 million people – were Africans, of whom around 1 million have already died. Eastern and Southern Africa alone accounted for an estimate of 60 percent of all people living with HIV and 100 percent of all AIDS deaths in 2011. The countries of Eastern and Southern Africa are most affected, leading to raised death rates and lowered life expectancy among adults between the ages of 20 and 49 by about twenty years. Furthermore, life expectancy in many parts of Africa is declining, largely as a result of the HIV/AIDS epidemic, with life-expectancy in some countries reaching as low as thirty-nine years.

Countries in North Africa, West Africa and the Horn of Africa have significantly low prevalence rates, as their populations typically engage in fewer high-risk cultural patterns that promote the spread of the virus in other parts of Africa. Southern Africa is the worst affected region on the continent. As of 2011, HIV has infected at least 10 percent of the population in Botswana, Lesotho, Malawi, Mozambique, Namibia, South Africa, Eswatini, Zambia, and Zimbabwe.

In response, a number of initiatives have been launched in various parts of the continent to educate the public on HIV/AIDS. Among these are combination prevention programs, considered to be the most effective initiative, such as the abstinence, be faithful, use a condom campaign or the Desmond Tutu HIV Foundation's outreach programs.

The number of HIV positive people in Africa receiving anti-retroviral treatment in 2012 were over seven times the number receiving treatment in 2005, with nearly 1 million added in the previous year. Between 2000 and 2018, new HIV infections fell by 37%, and HIV-related deaths fell by 45% with 13.6 million lives saved due to ART in the same period. This achievement was the result of great efforts by national HIV programmes supported by civil society and a range of development partners. It reported that 1.1 million people have been newly infected with HIV in 2018. An estimated 420,000 [340,000−530,000] people died in the African Region from HIV-related causes from 1985-2021, implying that mortality has dropped by approximately 55% since 2010.

== Overview ==
In a 2019 research article titled "The Impact of HIV & AIDS in Africa", the charitable organization AVERT wrote:

HIV ... has caused immense human suffering in the continent. The most obvious effect ... has been illness and death, but the impact ... has ... not been confined to the health sector; households, schools, workplaces and economies have also been badly affected. ...

In sub-Saharan Africa, people with HIV-related diseases occupy more than half of all hospital beds. ... [L]arge numbers of healthcare professionals are being directly affected.... Botswana, for example, lost 17% of its healthcare workforce due to AIDS between 1999 and 2005.

...
The toll of HIV and AIDS on households can be very severe. ... [I]t is often the poorest sectors of society that are most vulnerable.... In many cases, ... AIDS causes the household to dissolve, as parents die and children are sent to relatives for care and upbringing. ... Much happens before this dissolution takes place: AIDS strips families of their assets and income earners, further impoverishing the poor. ...

The ... epidemic adds to food insecurity in many areas, as agricultural work is neglected or abandoned due to household illness. ...

Almost invariably, the burden of coping rests with women. Upon a family member becoming ill, the role of women as carers, income-earners and housekeepers is stepped up. They are often forced to step into roles outside their homes as well. ...

Older people are also heavily affected by the epidemic; many have to care for their sick children and are often left to look after orphaned grandchildren. ...

It is hard to overemphasise the trauma and hardship that children ... are forced to bear. ... As parents and family members become ill, children take on more responsibility to earn an income, produce food, and care for family members. ... [M]ore children have been orphaned by AIDS in Africa than anywhere else. Many children are now raised by their extended families and some are even left on their own in child-headed households. ...

HIV and AIDS are having a devastating effect on the already inadequate supply of teachers in African countries.... The illness or death of teachers is especially devastating in rural areas where schools depend heavily on one or two teachers. ... [I]n Tanzania[,] for example[,] ... in 2006 it was estimated that around 45,000 additional teachers were needed to make up for those who had died or left work because of HIV....

AIDS damages businesses by squeezing productivity, adding costs, diverting productive resources, and depleting skills. ... Also, as the impact of the epidemic on households grows more severe, market demand for products and services can fall. ...
In many countries of sub-Saharan Africa, AIDS is erasing decades of progress in extending life expectancy. ... The biggest increase in deaths ... has been among adults aged between 20 and 49 years. This group now accounts for 60% of all deaths in sub-Saharan Africa.... AIDS is hitting adults in their most economically productive years and removing the very people who could be responding to the crisis. ...

As access to treatment is slowly expanded throughout the continent, millions of lives are being extended and hope is being given to people who previously had none. Unfortunately though, the majority of people in need of treatment are still not receiving it, and campaigns to prevent new infections ... are lacking in many areas.

Regional comparisons of HIV in 2011
World region	Adult HIV prevalence (ages 15–49)	Persons living with HIV	AIDS deaths, annual	New HIV infections, annual
Worldwide	0.8%	34,000,000	1,700,000	2,500,000
Sub-Saharan Africa	4.9%	23,500,000	1,200,000	1,800,000
South and Southeast Asia	0.3%	4,000,000	250,000	280,000
Eastern Europe and Central Asia	1.0%	1,400,000	92,000	140,000
East Asia	0.1%	830,000	59,000	89,000
Latin America	0.4%	1,400,000	54,000	83,000
Middle East and North Africa	0.2%	300,000	23,000	37,000
North America	0.6%	1,400,000	21,000	51,000
Caribbean	1.0%	230,000	10,000	13,000
Western and Central Europe	0.2%	900,000	7,000	30,000
Oceania	0.3%	53,000	1,300	2,900

== Regional prevalence ==
In contrast to Arab North Africa and the Horn of Africa, traditional cultures and religions in Sub-Saharan Africa have generally exhibited a more liberal attitude to female out-of-marriage sexual activity. The latter includes practices such as multiple sexual partners and unprotected sex, high-risk cultural patterns that have been implicated in the much greater spread of HIV in the subcontinent.

=== North Africa ===
Country	Adult prevalence ages 15–49, 2021	Number of people living with HIV, 2021	AIDS deaths, 2021	New HIV infections, 2021
Algeria	<0.1%	21,000	<500	2000
Egypt	<0.1%	30,000	<1000	not available
Libya	0.2%	8,300	<200	<500
Morocco	<0.1%	23,000	<500	<1000
Sudan	0.1%	41,000	1,900	3,100
Tunisia	<0.1%	5,400	<500	<500

=== Horn of Africa ===
As with North Africa, the HIV infection rates in the Horn of Africa are quite low. This has been attributed to the Muslim nature of many of the local communities and adherence to Muslim norms regarding sexuality.

Ethiopia's HIV prevalence rate decreased from 3.6 percent in 2001 to 1.4 percent in 2011. The number of new infections per year decreased from 130,000 in 2001, to 24,000 in 2011.

Country	Adult prevalence ages 15–49, 2011	Adult prevalence ages 15–49, 2001	Number of people living with HIV, 2011	Number of people living with HIV, 2001	AIDS deaths, 2011	AIDS deaths, 2001	New HIV infections, 2011	New HIV infections, 2001
Djibouti	1.4%	2.7%	9,200	12,000	<1,000	1,000	<1,000	1,300
Eritrea	0.6%	1.1%	23,000	23,000	1,400	1,500	not available	not available
Ethiopia	1.4%	3.6%	790,000	1,300,000	54,000	100,000	24,000	130,000
Somalia	0.7%	0.8%	35,000	34,000	3,100	2,800	not available	not available

=== Central Africa ===
In 2010, HIV infection rates in central Africa were moderate to high.

Country	Adult prevalence ages 15–49, 2011	Adult prevalence ages 15–49, 2001	Number of people living with HIV, 2011	Number of people living with HIV, 2001	AIDS deaths, 2011	AIDS deaths, 2001	New HIV infections, 2011	New HIV infections, 2001
Angola	2.1%	1.7%	230,000	130,000	12,000	8,200	23,000	20,000
Cameroon	4.6%	5.1%	550,000	450,000	34,000	28,000	43,000	57,000
Central African Republic	4.6%	8.1%	130,000	170,000	10,000	16,000	8,200	15,000
Chad	3.1%	3.7%	210,000	170,000	12,000	13,000	not available	not available
Congo	3.3%	3.8%	83,000	74,000	4,600	6,900	7,900	7,200
Democratic Republic of the Congo	1.2–1.6%	not available	430,000–560,000	not available	26,000–40,000 (2009)	not available	not available	not available
Equatorial Guinea	4.7%	2.5%	20,000	7,900	<1,000	<500	not available	not available
Gabon	5.0%	5.2%	46,000	35,000	2,500	2,100	3,000	4,900
São Tomé and Príncipe	1.0%	0.9%	<1,000	<1,000	<100	<100	not available	not available

=== Eastern Africa ===
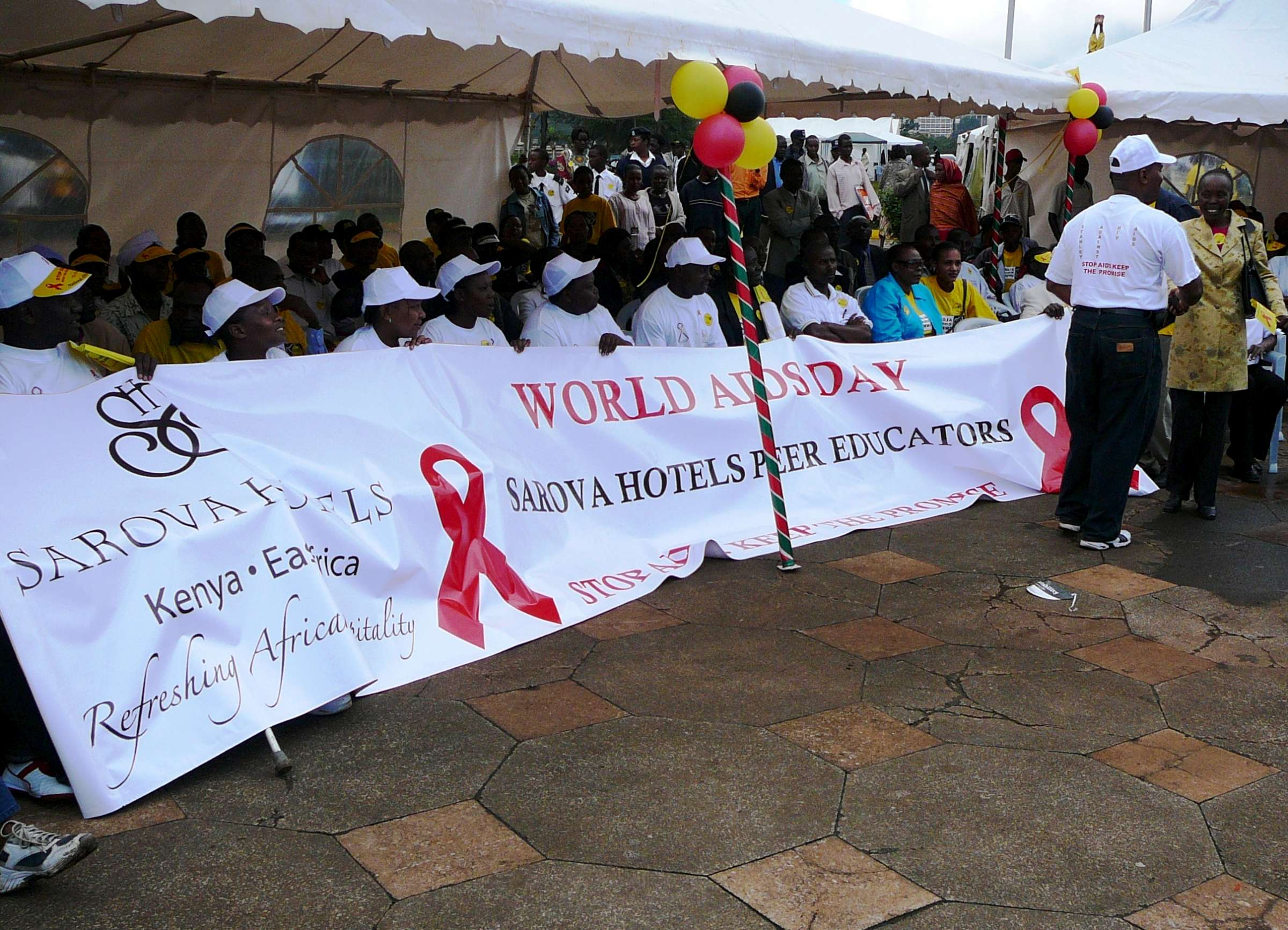
A World AIDS Day 2006 event in Kenya

HIV infection rates in eastern Africa are moderate to high.

==== Kenya ====
In 2008, Kenya had the third largest number of individuals in Sub-Saharan Africa living with HIV. Kenya had the highest prevalence rate of any country outside of Southern Africa. Kenya's HIV infection rate dropped from around 14 percent in the mid-1990s to 5 percent in 2006. It rose again to 6.2 percent by 2011. The number of newly infected people per year decreased by almost 30 percent, from 140,000 in 2001 to 100,000 in 2011.

In 2012, Nyanza Province had the highest HIV prevalence rate at 13.9 percent, with the North Eastern Province having the lowest rate at 0.9 percent.

Christian men and women had a higher infection rate than their Muslim counterparts. This discrepancy was especially visible among women, with Muslim women having a rate of 2.8 percent versus 8.4 percent among Protestant women and 8 percent among Catholic women. HIV detection was more common among the wealthiest than among the poorest, at 7.2 percent versus 4.6 percent.

Historically, HIV had been more prevalent in urban than rural areas, although the gap is closing rapidly. In 2013, men in rural areas were more likely to be HIV-infected, at 4.5 percent, than those in urban areas, at 3.7 percent.

==== Tanzania ====
Between 2004 and 2008, the HIV incidence rate in Tanzania for people aged 15–44 slowed to 3.37 per 1,000 person-years. The rate was 4.42 for women, and 2.36 for men. The number of newly infected people per year increased slightly, from 140,000 in 2001 to 150,000 in 2011. There were significantly fewer HIV infections in Zanzibar, which in 2011 had a prevalence rate of 1.0 percent compared to 5.3 percent in mainland Tanzania.

==== Uganda ====
Uganda has registered a gradual decrease in its HIV rates from 10.6 percent in 1997, to a stabilized 6.5–7.2 percent since 2001. This has been attributed to changing local behavioral patterns, with more respondents reporting greater use of contraceptives and a two-year delay in first sexual activity, as well as fewer people reporting casual sexual encounters and multiple partners.

The number of newly infected people per year increased by over 50 percent, from 99,000 in 2001 to 150,000 in 2011. More than 40 percent of new infections are among married couples, indicating widespread and increasing infidelity. This increase has caused alarm. The director of the Centre for Disease Control – Uganda, Wuhib Tadesse, said in 2011 that,

"For every person started on antiretroviral therapy, there are three new HIV infections[,] and this is unsustainable. We are very concerned. Complacence could be part of the problem. Young people nowadays no longer see people dying; they see people on ARVs but getting children. We need to re-examine our strategies.... Leaders at all levels are spending [more] time in workshops than in the communities to sensitive the people[,] and this must stop."

Country	Adult prevalence ages 15–49, 2011	Adult prevalence ages 15–49, 2001	Number of people living with HIV, 2011	Number of people living with HIV, 2001	AIDS deaths, 2011	AIDS deaths, 2001	New HIV infections, 2011	New HIV infections, 2001
Burundi	1.3%	3.5%	80,000	130,000	5,800	13,000	3,000	6,900
Comoros	0.1%	<0.1%	<500	<100	<100	<100	not available	not available
Kenya	6.2%	8.5%	1,600,000	1,600,000	62,000	130,000	100,000	140,000
Madagascar	0.3%	0.3%	34,000	22,000	2,600	1,500	not available	not available
Mauritius	1.0%	0.9%	7,400	6,600	<1,000	<500	not available	not available
Mayotte	not available	not available	not available	not available	not available	not available	not available	not available
Réunion	not available	not available	not available	not available	not available	not available	not available	not available
Rwanda	2.9%	4.1%	210,000	220,000	6,400	21,000	10,000	19,000
Seychelles	not available	not available	not available	not available	not available	not available	not available	not available
South Sudan	3.1%	not available	150,000	not available	11,000	not available	not available	not available
Tanzania	5.1%	7.2%	1,600,000	1,400,000	84,000	130,000	150,000	140,000
Uganda	7.2%	6.9%	1,400,000	990,000	62,000	100,000	150,000	99,000

=== Western Africa ===
Western Africa has moderate levels of infection of both HIV-1 and HIV-2. The onset of the HIV epidemic in the region began in 1985, with reported cases in Senegal, Benin, and Nigeria. These were followed in 1986 by Côte d'Ivoire. The first identification of HIV-2 occurred in Senegal by microbiologist Souleymane Mboup and his collaborators.

HIV prevalence in western Africa is lowest in Senegal and highest in Nigeria, which has the third largest number of people living with HIV in Africa after South Africa and Mozambique. Nigeria's infection rate, of the number of patients relative to the entire population, is much lower, at 3.7 percent, compared to South Africa's 17.3 percent.

In Niger in 2011, the national HIV prevalence rate for ages 15–49 was 0.8 percent. For sex workers, it was 36 percent.

Country	Adult prevalence ages 15–49, 2011	Adult prevalence ages 15–49, 2001	Number of people living with HIV, 2011	Number of people living with HIV, 2001	AIDS deaths, 2011	AIDS deaths, 2001	New HIV infections, 2011	New HIV infections, 2001
Benin	1.2%	1.7%	64,000	66,000	2,800	6,400	4,900	5,300
Burkina Faso	1.1%	2.1%	120,000	150,000	6,800	15,000	7,100	13,000
Cape Verde	1.0%	1.0%	3,300	2,700	<200	<500	not available	not available
Côte d'Ivoire	3.0%	6.2%	360,000	560,000	23,000	50,000	not available	not available
Gambia	1.5%	0.8%	14,000	5,700	<1,000	<500	1,300	1,200
Ghana	1.5%	2.2%	230,000	250,000	15,000 (Note: The WHO records the following deaths by country due to HIV/AIDS is 2006 as follows: Ghana: 22,000; Guinea: 6,100; Liberia: 3,400; Nigeria: 220,000; Togo: 11,000; Lesotho: 22,000; Malawi: 75,000; Namibia: 12,000; South Africa: 390,000; Eswatini: 9,800; "People dying from HIV-related causes - Estimates by WHO region". WHO.)	18,000	13,000	28,000
Guinea	1.4%	1.5%	85,000	72,000	4,000	5,100	not available	not available
Guinea-Bissau	2.5%	1.4%	24,000	9,800	<1,000	<1,000	2,900	1,800
Liberia	1.0%	2.5%	25,000	39,000	2,300	2,500	not available	not available
Mali	1.1%	1.6%	110,000	110,000	6,600	9,700	8,600	12,000
Mauritania	1.1%	0.6%	24,000	10,000	1,500	<1,000	not available	not available
Niger	0.8%	0.8%	65,000	45,000	4,000	3,200	6,400	6,200
Nigeria	3.7%	3.7%	3,400,000	2,500,000	210,000	150,000	340,000	310,000
Senegal	0.7%	0.5%	53,000	24,000	1,600	1,400	not available	not available
Sierra Leone	1.6%	0.9%	49,000	21,000	2,600	<1,000	3,900	4,500
Togo	3.4%	4.1%	150,000	120,000	8,900	8,100	9,500	17,000

=== Southern Africa ===
Graphs of life expectancy at birth for some Sub-Saharan countries, showing the fall in the 1990s primarily due to the AIDS pandemic.

In the mid-1980s, HIV and AIDS were virtually unheard of in southern Africa. It is now the worst-affected region in the world. Currently, Eswatini and Lesotho have the highest and second highest HIV prevalence rates in the world, respectively. Of the nine southern African countries (Botswana, Lesotho, Malawi, Mozambique, Namibia, South Africa, Eswatini, Zambia, and Zimbabwe), four are estimated to have an infection rate of over 15 percent.

In Botswana, the number of newly infected people per year declined by 67 percent, from 27,000 in 2001 to 9,000 in 2011. In Malawi, the decrease was 54 percent, from 100,000 in 2001 to 46,000 in 2011. All but two of the other countries in this region have recorded major decreases (Namibia, 62 percent; Zambia, 54 percent; Zimbabwe, 47 percent; South Africa, 38 percent; Eswatini, 32 percent). The number has remained virtually the same in Lesotho and Mozambique.

Zimbabwe's first reported case of HIV was in 1985.

There are widespread practices of sexual networking that involve multiple overlapping or concurrent sexual partners. Men's sexual networks, in particular, tend to be quite extensive, a fact that is tacitly accepted or even encouraged by many communities. Along with having multiple sexual partners, unemployment and population displacements resulting from drought and conflict have contributed to the spread of HIV/AIDS.

A study in 2000 found that local men refuse to use condoms during intercourse with girls or women performing sex work. The girls and women are in desperate need of money and do not have a choice. This leads to multiple sex partners, which increases the likelihood of their infection with HIV/AIDS.

A 2008 study in Botswana, Namibia, and Eswatini, found that intimate partner violence, extreme poverty, education, and partner income disparity explained almost all of the differences in HIV status among adults aged 15–29 years. Among young women with any one of these factors, the HIV rate increased from 7.7 percent with no factors, to 17.1 percent. Approximately 26 percent of young women with any two factors were HIV positive, with 36 percent of those with any three factors and 39.3 percent of those with all four factors being HIV-positive.

Country	Adult prevalence ages 15–49, 2011	Adult prevalence ages 15–49, 2001	Number of people living with HIV, 2011	Number of people living with HIV, 2001	AIDS deaths, 2011	AIDS deaths, 2001	New HIV infections, 2011	New HIV infections, 2001
Botswana	23.4%	27.0%	300,000	270,000	4,200	18,000	9,000	27,000
Lesotho	23.3%	23.4%	320,000	250,000	14,000	15,000	26,000	26,000
Malawi	10.0%	13.8%	910,000	860,000	44,000	63,000	46,000	100,000
Mozambique	11.3%	9.7%	1,400,000	850,000	74,000	46,000	130,000	140,000
Namibia	13.4%	15.5%	190,000	160,000	5,200	8,600	8,800	23,000
South Africa	17.3%	15.9%	5,600,000	4,400,000	270,000	210,000	380,000	610,000
Eswatini	26.0%	22.2%	190,000	120,000	6,800	6,700	13,000	19,000
Zambia	12.5%	14.4%	970,000	860,000	31,000	72,000	51,000	110,000
Zimbabwe	14.9%	25.0%	1,200,000	1,800,000	58,000	150,000	74,000	140,000

==== Eswatini ====
In 2011, the HIV prevalence rate in Eswatini was the highest in the world, at 26.0 percent of citizens aged 15–49. The United Nations Development Program wrote in 2005,

The immense scale of AIDS-related illness and deaths is weakening governance capacities for service delivery, with serious consequences on food security, economic growth[,] and human development. AIDS undermines the capacities of individuals, families, communities[,] and the state to fulfill their roles and responsibilities in society. If current trends are not reversed, the longer-term survival of Swaziland as a country will be seriously threatened.

In 2009, the HIV epidemic in Eswatini reduced its life expectancy at birth to 49 years for men, and 51 years for women. Life expectancy at birth in 1990 was 59 for men and 62 for women.

In 2011, Eswatini's crude death rate of 19.51 per 1,000 people per year was the third highest in the world, behind only Lesotho and Sierra Leone. HIV/AIDS in 2002 caused 64 percent of all deaths in Eswatini.

== Origins of HIV/AIDS in Africa ==
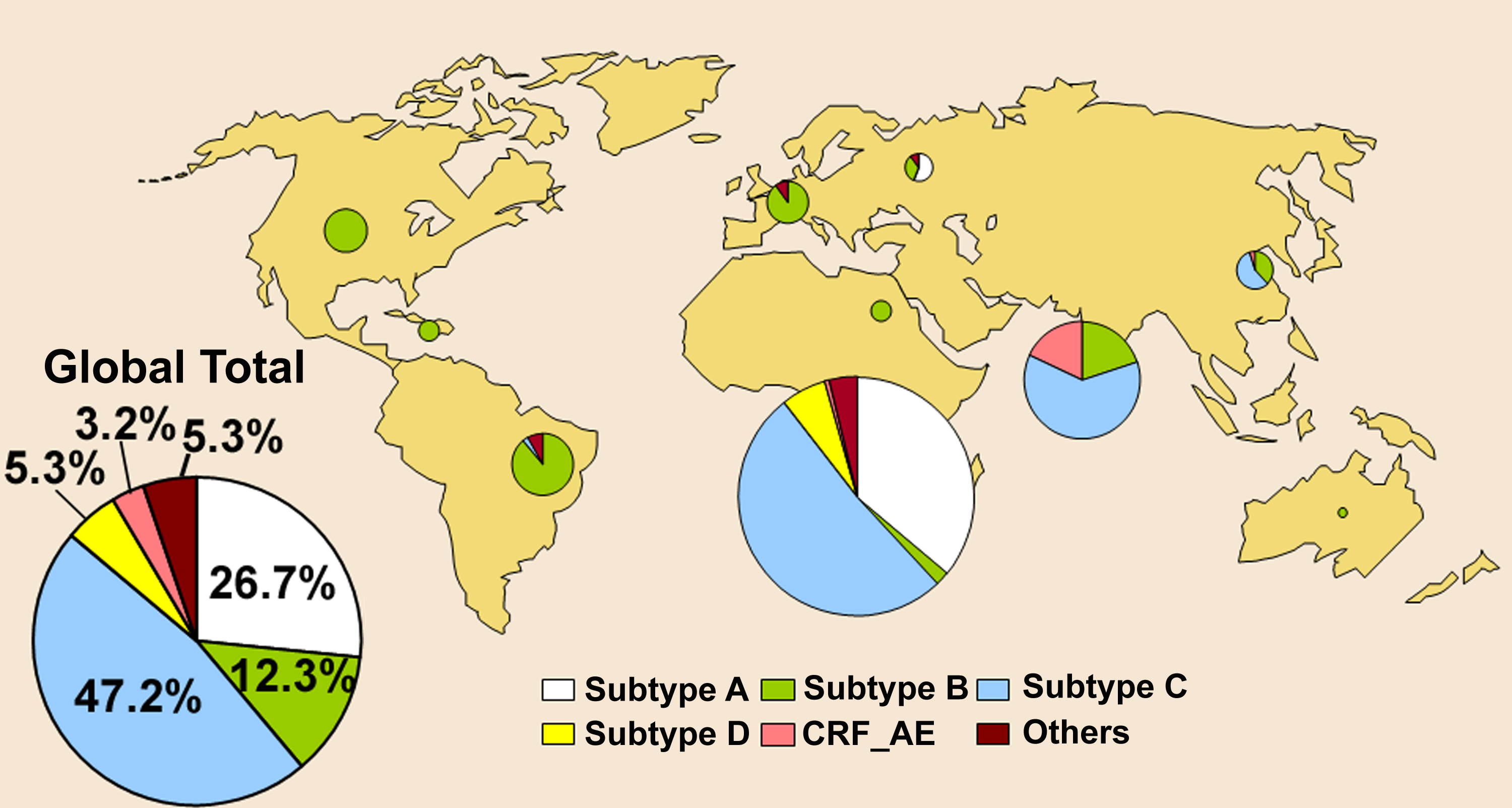
The prevalence of HIV-1 subtypes, 2002

The earliest known cases of human HIV infection were in western equatorial Africa, probably in southeastern Cameroon where groups of the central common chimpanzee live. "Phylogenetic analyses revealed that all HIV-1 strains known to infect humans, including HIV-1 groups M, N, and O, were closely related to just one of these SIV cpz lineages: that found in P. t. troglodytes [Pan troglodytes troglodytes i.e. the central chimpanzee]." It is suspected that the disease jumped to humans from butchering of chimpanzees for human consumption.

Current hypotheses also include that, once the virus jumped from chimpanzees or other apes to humans, medical practices of the early 20th century helped HIV become established in human populations by 1930. The virus likely moved from primates to humans when hunters came into contact with the blood of infected primates. The hunters then became infected with HIV and passed on the disease to other humans through bodily fluid contamination. This theory is known as the "Bushmeat theory".

HIV made the leap from rural isolation to rapid urban transmission as a result of urbanization that occurred during the 20th century. There are many reasons why there is such a high prevalence of AIDS in Africa. One of the most formative explanations is the poverty that dramatically affects the daily lives of Africans. The book, Ethics and AIDS in Africa: A Challenge to Our Thinking, describes how "Poverty has accompanying side-effects, such as prostitution (i.e. the need to sell sex for survival), poor living conditions, education, health and health care, that are major contributing factors to the current spread of HIV/AIDS."

Researchers believe HIV was gradually spread by river travel. All the rivers in Cameroon run into the Sangha River, which joins the Congo River running past Kinshasa in the Democratic Republic of the Congo. Trade along the rivers could have spread the virus, which built up slowly in the human population. By the 1960s, about 2,000 people in Africa may have had HIV, including people in Kinshasa whose tissue samples from 1959 and 1960 have been preserved and studied retrospectively. The first epidemic of HIV/AIDS is believed to have occurred in Kinshasa in the 1970s, signaled by a surge in opportunistic infections such as cryptococcal meningitis, Kaposi's sarcoma, tuberculosis, and pneumonia.

== History ==
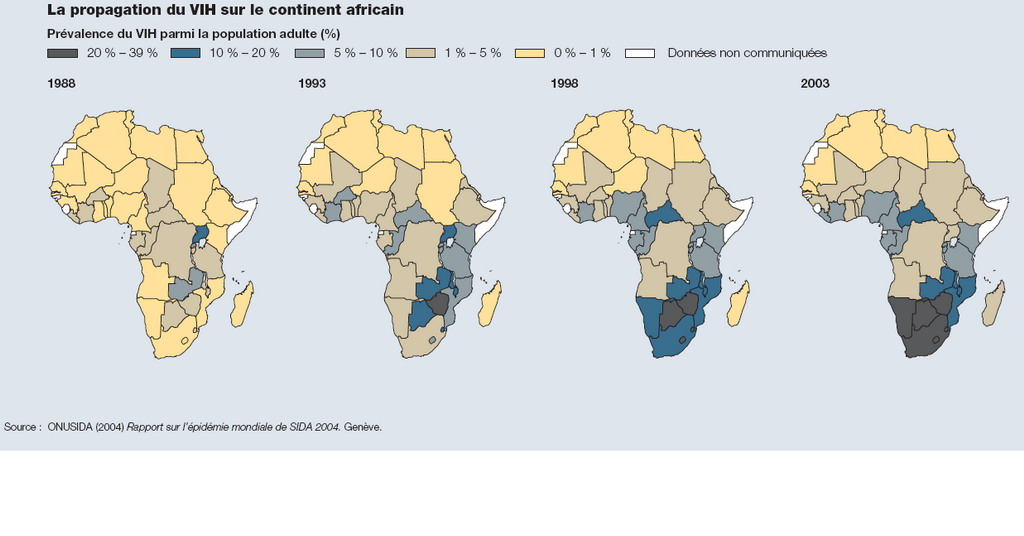
The prevalence of HIV/AIDS in Africa, from 1988 to 2003

Acquired immunodeficiency syndrome (AIDS) is a fatal disease caused by the slow-acting human immunodeficiency virus (HIV). The virus multiplies in the body until it causes immune system damage, leading to diseases of the AIDS syndrome. HIV emerged in Africa in the 1960s and spread to the United States and Europe the following decade.

In the 1980s it spread across the globe until it became a pandemic. Some areas of the world were already significantly impacted by AIDS, while in others the epidemic was just beginning. The virus is transmitted by bodily fluid contact including the exchange of sexual fluids, by blood, from mother to child in the womb, and during delivery or breastfeeding. AIDS first was identified in the United States and France in 1981, principally among homosexual men. In 1982 and 1983, heterosexual Africans also were diagnosed.

In the late 1980s, international development agencies regarded AIDS control as a technical medical problem rather than one involving all areas of economic and social life. Because public health authorities perceived AIDS to be an urban phenomenon associated with prostitution, they believed that the majority of Africans who lived in "traditional" rural areas would be spared. They believed that the heterosexual epidemic could be contained by focusing prevention efforts on persuading the so-called core transmitters—people such as sex workers and truck drivers, known to have multiple sex partners—to use condoms. These factors hindered prevention campaigns in many countries for more than a decade.

Prevalence of HIV/AIDS in Africa over the years

Although many governments in Sub-Saharan Africa denied that there was a problem for years, they have now begun to work toward solutions.

AIDS was at first considered a disease of gay men and people suffering from drug addiction, but in Africa it took off among the general population. As a result, those involved in the fight against HIV began to emphasize aspects such as preventing transmission from mother to child, or the relationship between HIV and poverty, inequality of the sexes, and so on, rather than emphasizing the need to prevent transmission by unsafe sexual practices or drug injection. This change in emphasis resulted in more funding, but was not effective in preventing a drastic rise in HIV prevalence.

The global response to HIV and AIDS has improved considerably in recent years. Funding comes from many sources, the largest of which are the Global Fund to Fight AIDS, Tuberculosis and Malaria and the President's Emergency Plan for AIDS Relief.

The number of HIV positive people in Africa receiving anti-retroviral treatment rose from 1 million to 7.1 million between 2005 and 2012, an 805% increase. Almost 1 million of those patients were treated in 2012. The number of HIV positive people in South Africa who received such treatment in 2011 was 75.2 percent higher than the number in 2009.

The number of AIDS-related deaths in 2011 in both Africa as a whole and Sub-Saharan Africa alone was 32 percent less than in 2005. The number of new HIV infections in Africa in 2011 was 33 percent less than in 2001, with a "24% reduction in new infections among children from 2009 to 2011". In Sub-Saharan Africa, new HIV positive cases over the same period declined by 25%. According to UNAIDS, these successes have resulted from "strong leadership and shared responsibility in Africa and among the global community", including the work of Leopold Zekeng, who served as the organization's Country Director in Sierra Leone, Liberia, Ghana, Tanzania, and currently, Nigeria.

== Prevention of HIV infections ==
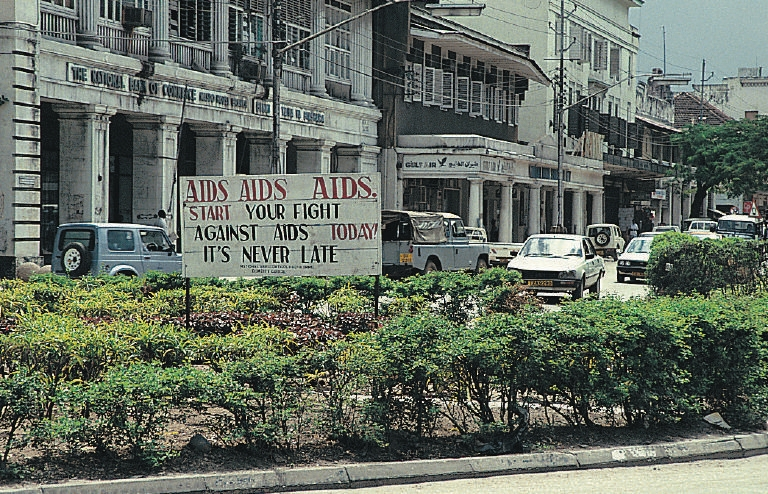
An AIDS awareness sign in central Dar es Salaam, Tanzania

=== Public education initiatives ===
Numerous public education initiatives have been launched to curb the spread of HIV in Africa.

=== The role of stigma ===
Many activists have drawn attention to stigmatization of those testing as HIV positive. This is due to many factors such as a lack of understanding of the disease, lack of access to treatment, the media, knowing that AIDS is incurable, and prejudices brought on by a cultures beliefs. "When HIV/AIDS became a global disease, Some African leaders played ostrich and said that it was a gay disease found only in the West and Africans did not have to worry because there were no gays and lesbians in Africa".

Africans were unaware of the already huge epidemic that was infesting their communities. The belief that only homosexuals could contract the diseases was later debunked as the number of heterosexual couples living with HIV increased. Unfortunately there were other rumors being spread by elders in Cameroon. These "elders speculated that HIV/AIDS was a sexually transmitted disease passed on from Fulani women only to non-Fulani men who had sexual contact with them. They also claimed if a man was infected as a result of having sexual contact with a Fulani woman, only a Fulani healer could treat him".

This communal belief is shared by many other African cultures who believe that HIV and AIDS originated from women. Because of this belief that men can only get HIV from women many "women are not free to speak of their HIV status to their partners for fear of violence".

In general HIV carries a negative stigma in Sub-Saharan Africa. This stigma makes it very challenging for Sub-Saharan Africans to share that they have HIV, because they are afraid of being an outcast from their friends and family. In every Sub-Saharan community, HIV is seen as the bringer of death. The common belief is that once you have HIV you are destined to die. People seclude themselves based on these beliefs. They do not tell their family and live with guilt and fear because of HIV. In a 2014 survey "80.8% of participants would not sleep in the same room as someone who was HIV positive, while 94.5% would not talk to someone who was HIV positive".

Social stigma plays a significant role in the state of HIV and AIDS infection in Africa. "In a normatively HIV/AIDS-stigmatizing Sub Saharan African communities, this suspicion of one's status by others is also applicable to individuals who are not HIV positive, but who may wish to utilize healthcare services for preventive purposes. This group of individuals under fear of suspicion may avoid being mistakenly identified as stigmatized by simply avoiding HARHS utilization." (151)

"At the individual level, persons living with HIV/AIDS in Sub-Saharan Africa likely want to conceal their stigmatized identities whenever possible in order to gain these rewards associated with having a 'normal' identity. The rewards of being considered normal' in the context of high-HIV-prevalence Sub-Saharan Africa are varied and great... such rewards for which there is empirical support in this context include perceived sexual freedom, avoidance of discrimination, avoidance of community or family rejection, avoidance of losing one's job or residence, and avoidance of losing one's sexual partners. Other potential rewards of being considered normal include avoidance of being associated with promiscuity or prostitution, avoidance of emotional, social and physical isolation and avoidance of being blamed for others' illness" (150).

==== Combination prevention programs ====
The Joint United Nations Program on HIV/AIDS defines combination prevention programs as:

rights-based, evidence-informed, and community-owned programs that use a mix of biomedical, behavioral, and structural interventions, prioritized to meet the current HIV prevention needs of particular individuals and communities, so as to have the greatest sustained impact on reducing new infections. Well-designed programs are carefully tailored to national and local needs and conditions; focus resources on the mix of programmatic and policy actions required to address both immediate risks and underlying vulnerability; and are thoughtfully planned and managed to operate synergistically and consistently on multiple levels (e.g. individual, relationship, community, society) and over an adequate period of time. Using different prevention strategies in combination is not a new idea combination approaches have been used effectively to generate sharp, sustained reductions in new HIV infections in diverse settings. Combination prevention reflects common sense, yet it is striking how seldom the approach has been put into practice. Prevention efforts to date have overwhelmingly focused on reducing individual risk, with fewer efforts made to address societal factors that increase vulnerability to HIV. UNAIDS' combination prevention framework puts structural interventions—including programs to promote human rights, to remove punitive laws that block the AIDS response, and to combat gender inequality and HIV related stigma and discrimination—at the center of the HIV prevention agenda.

"It is the consensus in the HIV scientific community that abstinence, be faithful, use a condom [(ABC)] principles are vital guides for public health intervention, but are better bundled with biomedical prevention approaches; lone behavioral change approaches are not likely to stop the global pandemic." Uganda has replaced its ABC strategy with a combination prevention program because of an increase in the annual HIV infection rate. Most new infections were coming from people in long-term relationships who had multiple sexual partners.

==== Abstinence, be faithful, use a condom ====
The abstinence, be faithful, use a condom (ABC) strategy to prevent HIV infection promotes safer sexual behavior and emphasizes the need for fidelity, fewer sexual partners, and a later age of sexual debut. The implementation of ABC differs among those who use it. For example, the President's Emergency Plan for AIDS Relief has focused more on abstinence and fidelity than condoms while Uganda has had a more balanced approach to the three elements.

The effectiveness of ABC is controversial. At the 16th International AIDS Conference in 2006, African countries gave the strategy mixed reviews. In Botswana,

Much of the ABC message was getting through, but it was not making much of a difference. A program called Total Community Mobilization sent 450 AIDS counselors door-to-door, giving prevention advice, urging HIV testing and referring infected people to treatment. People who had talked to the counselors were twice as likely to mention abstinence and three times as likely to mention condom use when asked to describe ways to avoid infection. However, they were no more likely than the uncounseled to mention being faithful as a good strategy. The people who had been counseled were also twice as likely to have been tested for HIV in the previous year, and to have discussed that possibility with a sex partner. However, they were just as likely to have a partner outside marriage as the people who had not gotten a visit from a counselor, and they were no more likely to be using a condom in those liaisons.

In Nigeria,

There was a somewhat different result in a study of young Nigerians, ages 15 to 24, most unmarried, living in the city and working in semiskilled jobs. People in specific neighborhoods were counseled with an ABC message as part of a seven-year project funded by the [[United States Agency for International Development [U.S. Agency for International Development] and its British counterpart. The uncounseled group showed no increase in condom use—it stayed about 55 percent. In the counseled group, however, condom use by women in their last nonmarital sexual encounter rose from 54 percent to 69 percent. For men, it rose from 64 percent to 75 percent. Stigmatizing attitudes appeared to be less common among the counseled group. But "We did not see a reduction in the number of partners," said Godspower Omoregie, the researcher from Abuja who presented the findings.

In Kenya,

A survey of 1,400 Kenyan teenagers found a fair amount of confusion about ABC's messages. Half of the teenagers could correctly define abstinence and explain why it was important. Only 23 percent could explain what being faithful meant and why it was important. Some thought it meant being honest, and some thought it meant having faith in the fidelity of one's partner. Only 13 percent could correctly explain the importance of a condom in preventing HIV infection. About half spontaneously offered negative opinions about condoms, saying they were unreliable, immoral and, in some cases, were designed to let HIV be transmitted.

In Ghana,

An estimated value of about 300,000 people(All ages) have been infected with the HIV virus. This is prevalent and highest in the Eastern Region of Ghana and lowest in the Northern Regions of the country. As part of national efforts to control the wide spread of the HIV virus, the ABC approach is a popular strategy employed for HIV prevention in the country. The virus is higher among women than among men in all age groups with estimates of 56 percent among females and 44 percent among male. Sexual transmission remains the major mode of HIV transmission in Ghana but other approaches such as Information Education and Communication (IEC) and Behavior Change Communication (BCC) are all been used for the course of the virus prevention.

Eswatini in 2010 announced that it was abandoning the ABC strategy because it was a dismal failure in preventing the spread of HIV. "If you look at the increase of HIV in the country while we've been applying the ABC concept all these years, then it is evident that ABC is not the answer," said Dr. Derek von Wissell, Director of the National Emergency Response Council on HIV/AIDS.

==== Prevention efforts ====
In 1999, the Henry J. Kaiser Family Foundation and the Bill and Melinda Gates Foundation provided major funding for the Love Life website, an online sexual health and relationship resource for teenagers.

In 2011, the Botswana Ministry of Education introduced new HIV/AIDS educational technology in local schools. The TeachAids prevention software, developed at Stanford University, was distributed to every primary, secondary, and tertiary educational institution in the country, reaching all learners from 6 to 24 years of age nationwide.

=== African Union's efforts ===
==== AIDS Watch Africa ====
During the Abuja African Union Summit on HIV/AIDS in April 2001, the heads of state and heads of government of Botswana, Ethiopia, Kenya, Mali, Nigeria, Rwanda, South Africa, and Uganda established the AIDS Watch Africa (AWA) advocacy platform. The initiative was formed to "accelerate efforts by Heads of State and Government to implement their commitments for the fight against HIV/AIDS, and to mobilize the required national and international resources." In January 2012, AWA was revitalized to include all of Africa and its objectives were broadened to include malaria and tuberculosis.

==== Roadmap on Shared Responsibility and Global Solidarity for AIDS, TB and Malaria Response in Africa ====
In 2012, the African Union adopted a Roadmap on Shared Responsibility and Global Solidarity for AIDS, TB and Malaria Response in Africa. This Roadmap outlines a set of African-developed strategies to strengthen shared responsibility and international cooperation for achieving sustainable AIDS solutions in Africa by 2015. The solutions are organized around three strategic pillars: diversified financing; access to medicines; and enhanced health governance. The Roadmap defines goals, results and roles and responsibilities to hold stakeholders accountable for the realization of these solutions between 2012 and 2015.

=== Preventing HIV transmission from pregnant women to children ===
The Joint United Nations Program on HIV/AIDS reported that the following sixteen African nations in 2012 "ensure[d] that more than three-quarters of pregnant women living with HIV receive antiretroviral medicine to prevent transmission to their child": Botswana, Eswatini, Gabon, Gambia, Ghana, Mauritius, Mozambique, Namibia, Rwanda, São Tomé and Principe, Seychelles, Sierra Leone, South Africa, Tanzania, Zambia and Zimbabwe.

=== Organizational Advocacy ===
Through the International Conference on AIDS and STIs in Africa (ICASA), Africans gather annually in a collective effort to end HIV/AIDS by 2030 by reclaiming leadership. Also, organizations such as Africa Reach work within a Pan-African framework to build an AIDS-free society by focusing on children and young people.

The late King of Tooro, Oyo Nyimba Kabamba Iguru Rukiidi IV, has been praised by advocates for his contribution to HIV/AIDS advocacy in Uganda and across Africa. He served as a UNAIDS appointee, working across Southern and Eastern Africa. In 2026, UNAIDS partnered with Zambian communities to roll out lenacapavir alongside the Global Fund to accelerate HIV prevention and treatment.

Leap Academy, through youth advocacy programs in Nigeria, Cameroon, Senegal, Ghana, and Côte d’Ivoire, collaborates with Frontline AIDS and the Elton John AIDS Foundation to train young leaders in movement building around HIV/AIDS. In 2026, one of the fellows, alongside scholars from Bisi Alimi Foundation’s Rainbow Academy Fellowship, developed a policy brief titled “Closing the Enforcement Gap: Enforcing Nigeria’s HIV and AIDS Anti-Discrimination Act 2014 to Guarantee Workplace Compliance and Protect Livelihoods.”

== International Conference on AIDS and STIs in Africa ==
Biennially, leaders across the HIV prevention and treatment sector through International Conference on AIDS and STIS in Africa (ICASA) gather to deliberate on global developments, African realities and leadership around global health. The event has been hosted in 16 countries and has attracted more than 100,000 direct participants. It is the biggest platform in Africa dedicated to the HIV and AIDS response, bringing together activists, scientists, policymakers, health professionals, and community members.

In 2025, the 23rd edition of the conference was held from December 2 to 8 in Accra, Ghana bringing dialogues, innovation and equity around HIV prevention. The 24th edition will be held in Benin Republic from December 5 to 9, 2027.

== Causes and spread ==
=== Behavioral factors ===
High-risk behavioral patterns are largely responsible for the significantly greater spread of HIV/AIDS in Sub-Saharan Africa than in other parts of the world. Chief among these are the traditionally liberal attitudes espoused by many communities inhabiting the subcontinent toward multiple sexual partners and pre-marital and outside marriage sexual activity. HIV transmission is most likely in the first few weeks after infection, and is therefore increased when people have more than one sexual partner in the same time period.

In most of the developed world outside Africa, this means HIV transmission is high among prostitutes and other people who may have more than one sexual partner concurrently. Within the cultures of sub-Saharan Africa, it is relatively common for both men and women to be carrying on sexual relations with more than one person, which promotes HIV transmission. This practice is known as concurrency, which Helen Epstein describes in her book, The Invisible Cure: Africa, the West, and the Fight against AIDS, in which her research into the sexual mores of Uganda revealed the high frequency with which men and women engage in concurrent sexual relationships.

In sub-Saharan Africa AIDS is the leading killer. A large reason for the high transmission rates is because of the lack of education provided to youth. When infected, most children die within one year because of the lack of treatment.

All demographic populations in Sub-Saharan Africa have been infected with HIV, from men to women, and from pregnant women to children. Rather than having more of a specific group infected, male or female, the ratio of men and women infected with HIV are quite similar. With the HIV infection, 77% of men, women, and children, develop AIDS, and die in Sub-Saharan Africa. In addition, "more than 90% of AIDS orphans and children [were] infected with HIV".

Lack of money is an obvious challenge, although a great deal of aid is distributed throughout developing countries with high HIV/AIDS rates. For African countries with advanced medical facilities, patents on many drugs have hindered the ability to make low cost alternatives.

Natural disasters and conflict are also major challenges, as the resulting economic problems people face can drive many young women and girls into patterns of sex work in order to ensure their livelihood or that of their family, or else to obtain safe passage, food, shelter or other resources. Emergencies can also lead to greater exposure to HIV infection through new patterns of sex work. In Mozambique, an influx of humanitarian workers and transporters, such as truck drivers, attracted sex workers from outside the area. Similarly, in the Turkana District of northern Kenya, drought led to a decrease in clients for local sex workers, prompting the sex workers to relax their condom use demands and search for new truck driver clients on main highways and in peri-urban settlements.

=== Health industry ===
Sub-Saharan "Africans have always appreciated the importance of health care because good health is seen as necessary for the continuation and growth of their lineage". Without proper health the culture will not be able to thrive and grow. Unfortunately, "health services in many countries are swamped by the need to care for increasing numbers of infected and sick people. Ameliorative drugs are too expensive for most victims, except for a very small number who are affluent". The greatest number of sick people with the fewest doctors, Sub-Saharan Africa "has 11 percent of the world's population but carries 24 percent of the global disease burden. With less than 1 percent of global health expenditure and only 3 percent of the world's health workers".

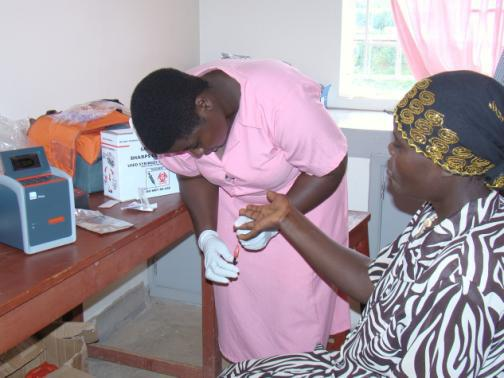
Measuring an HIV patient's CD4 count at the Kyabugimbi Health Center in Uganda

When family members get sick with HIV or other sicknesses, family members often end up selling most of their belongings in order to provide health care for the individual. Medical facilities in many African countries are lacking. Many health care workers are also not available, in part due to lack of training by governments and in part due to the wooing of these workers by foreign medical organizations where there is a need for medical professionals.

Notably, Dr. Leopold Zekeng, a Cameroonian virologist and UNAIDS country director, has emphasized the importance of building local research infrastructure and public health capacity to reduce overreliance on external aid and improve treatment access across West and Central Africa. Zekeng, Leopold (2024). The Journey Outlives The Traveller. ISBN 978-978-695-070-9.

Many individuals who get a medical degree end up leaving Sub-Saharan Africa to work abroad "either to escape instability or to practice where they have better working conditions and a higher salary". Many low income communities are very far away from a hospital and they cannot afford to bus there or pay for medical attention once they arrive. "Healthcare in Africa differs widely, depending on the country and also the region – those living in urban areas are more likely to receive better healthcare services than those in rural or remote regions".

It is very common to just wait out a sickness or seek help from a neighbor or relative. Currently antiretroviral therapy is the closest to a cure. Many hospitals lack enough antiretroviral drugs to treat everyone. This may be because most Sub-Saharan African countries invest "as little as 1-4 dollars per capita, [so] overseas aid is a major source of funding for healthcare".

Many overseas organizations are hesitant to give antiretroviral drugs to Sub-Saharan Africa because they are expensive, which means that there is only so much they can give. Relying on other countries for help in general requires more paperwork and faith in another country far away. Delivery of drugs and other aid takes many month and years to arrive in the hands of those that need help.

=== Medical factors ===
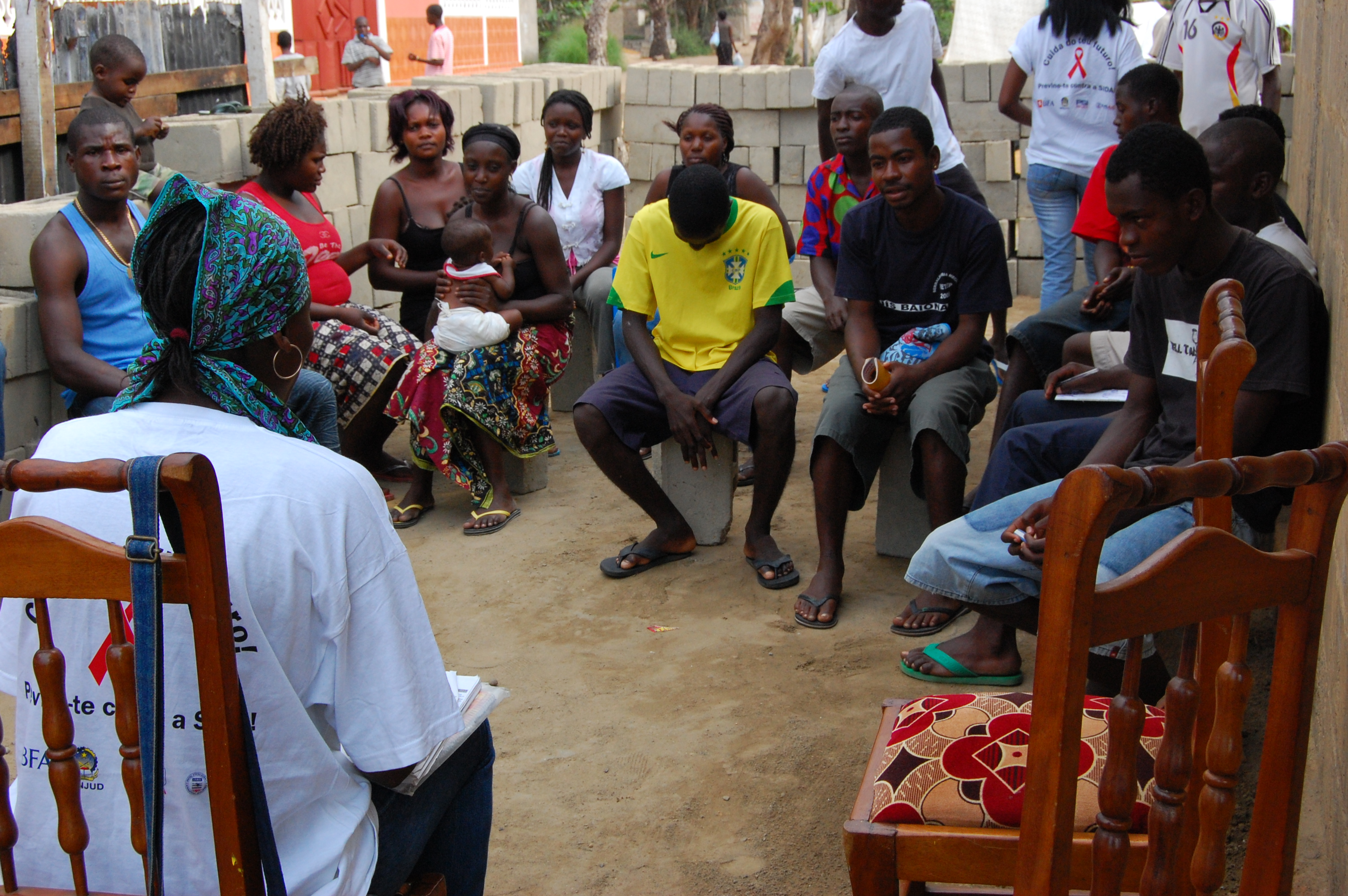
An HIV/AIDS educational outreach session in Angola

There are high levels of medical suspicion throughout Africa, and there is evidence that such distrust may have a significant impact on the use of medical services. The distrust of modern medicine is sometimes linked to theories of a "Western Plot" of mass sterilization or population reduction. Author Harriet A. Washington argues that this may be due to several high-profile incidents involving western medical practitioners.

=== Pharmaceutical industry ===
Africans are still fighting against unethical human experimentation and other practices of unfair treatment by the pharmaceutical industry. Medical experimentation occurs in Africa on many medications, but once approved, access to the drug is difficult.

South African scientists in a combined effort with American scientists from Gilead Sciences recently tested and found effective a tenofovir-based anti-retroviral vaginal gel that could be used as pre-exposure prophylaxis. Testing of this gel was conducted at the University of KwaZulu-Natal in Durban, South Africa. The FDA in the US is in the process of reviewing the drug for approval for US use. The AIDS/HIV epidemic has led to the rise in unethical medical experimentation in Africa.

Since the epidemic is widespread, African governments sometimes relax their laws in order to get research conducted in their countries which they would otherwise not afford. Global organizations such as the Clinton Foundation, are working to reduce the cost of HIV/AIDS medications in Africa and elsewhere. For example, the philanthropist Inder Singh oversaw a program which reduced the cost of paediatric HIV/AIDS drugs by between 80 and 92 percent by working with manufacturers to reduce production and distribution costs. Manufacturers often cite distribution and production difficulties in developing markets, which create a substantial barrier to entry.

=== Political factors ===
Major African political leaders have denied the link between HIV and AIDS, favoring alternate theories. The scientific community considers the evidence that HIV causes AIDS to be conclusive and rejects AIDS-denialist claims as pseudoscience based on conspiracy theories, faulty reasoning, cherry picking, and misrepresentation of mainly outdated scientific data.

=== Subtype factor ===
Subtypes A and C are the most prevalent HIV subtypes in Africa, and subtype C is the most prominent in the world, accounting for about 50% of all HIV infections. Despite this, the majority of HIV research has historically been focused on subtype B, which constitutes only 12% of infections, mostly in Europe. Due to this lack of research, it is currently unclear whether or not subtype C has evolved factors for increased viral transmission compared to other HIV subtypes.

=== Religious factors ===
Pressure from both Christian and Muslim religious leaders has resulted in the banning of a number of safe-sex campaigns, including condom promoting advertisements.

=== Climate change ===
There is a growing impact of the climate crisis in driving HIV risk which is affecting the availability of and access to services for HIV treatment, prevention and care. 3.6 billion people live in regions highly susceptible to climate change, and many of those populations are disproportionately affected by HIV. Increased migration and population displacement, food insecurity, economic stress, conflict, communicable diseases, and the erosion of health infrastructure can increase the rates of HIV infection and worsen the health and wellbeing of people with HIV.

Based on mathematical models, if there is no reduction in carbon emissions it is expected that there will be an increase of between 11 million and 16 million HIV cases in countries in sub-Saharan Africa by 2050 as a result of increasing temperatures due to climate change.

== Health care delivery ==
While there is currently no cure or vaccine for HIV/AIDS there are emerging treatments. It has been extensively discussed that antiretroviral drugs (ART) are crucial for preventing the acquiring of AIDS. AIDS is acquired at the final stage of the HIV virus, which can be completely averted. It is overwhelmingly possible to live with the virus and never acquire AIDS. The proper obedience to ART drugs can provide an infected person with a limitless future. ART drugs are key in preventing the diseases from progressing as well as ensuring the disease is well controlled, thus forbidding the disease from becoming resistant to the treatments.

In countries like Nigeria and the Central African Republic, less than 25% of the population has access to the ART drugs. Funds devoted to ART drug access were measured at $19.1 billion in 2013 in low and middle-income countries among the region, however the funds were short of the UNAIDS' previous resource needs estimates of $22–24 billion by 2015.

== Measurement ==
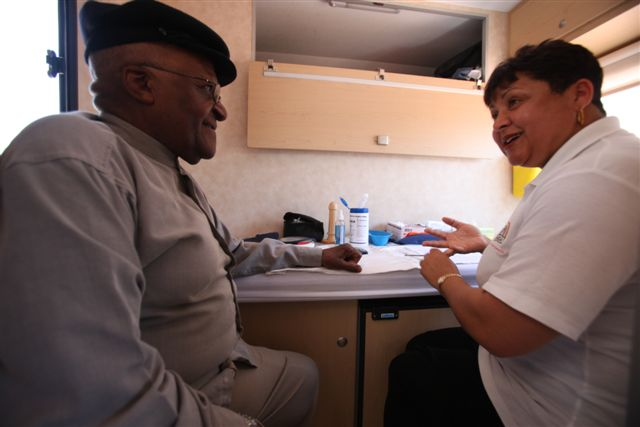
Archbishop Desmond Tutu gets an HIV test on the Desmond Tutu HIV Foundation's Tutu Tester, a mobile test unit.

Prevalence measures include everyone living with HIV and AIDS, and present a delayed representation of the epidemic by aggregating the HIV infections of many years. Incidence, in contrast, measures the number of new infections, usually over the previous year. There is no practical, reliable way to assess incidence in Sub-Saharan Africa. Prevalence in 15- to 24-year-old pregnant women attending antenatal clinics is sometimes used as an approximation. The test done to measure prevalence is a sero survey in which blood is tested for the presence of HIV.

Health units that conduct sero surveys rarely operate in remote rural communities, and the data collected also does not measure people who seek alternate healthcare. Extrapolating national data from antenatal surveys relies on assumptions which may not hold across all regions and at different stages in an epidemic.

Thus, there may be significant disparities between official figures and actual HIV prevalence in some countries.

A minority of scientists claim that as many as 40 percent of HIV infections in African adults may be caused by unsafe medical practices rather than by sexual activity. The World Health Organization states that about 2.5 percent of HIV infections in Sub-Saharan Africa are caused by unsafe medical injection practices and the "overwhelming majority" by unprotected sex.

== Tuberculosis coinfections ==
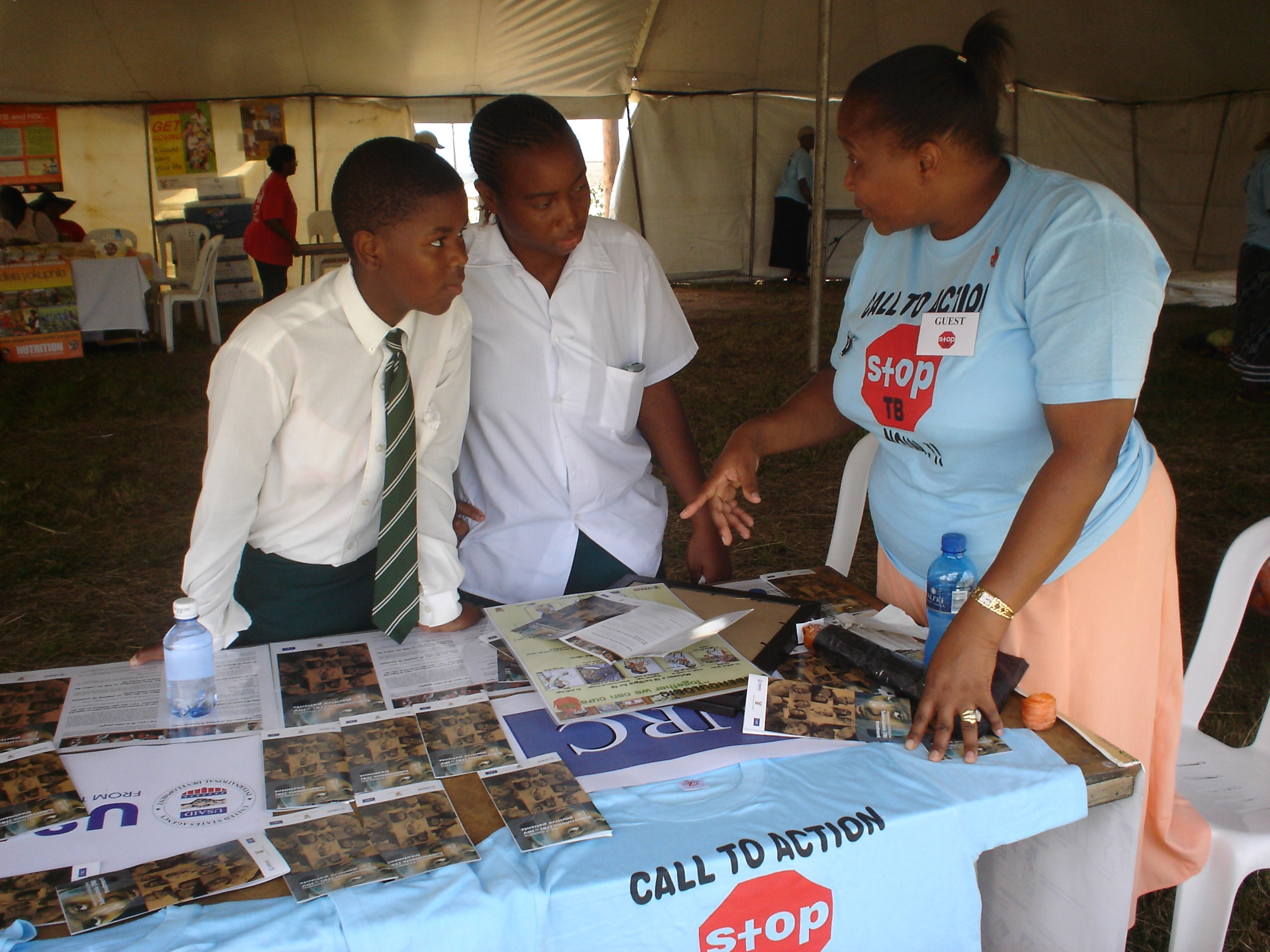
Workshop on HIV/AIDS and tuberculosis in South Africa

Much of the deadliness of the epidemic in Sub-Saharan Africa is caused by a deadly synergy between HIV and tuberculosis, termed a "co-epidemic". The two diseases have been "inextricably bound together" since the beginning of the HIV epidemic. "Tuberculosis and HIV co-infections are associated with special diagnostic and therapeutic challenges and constitute an immense burden on healthcare systems of heavily infected countries like Ethiopia."

In many countries without adequate resources, the tuberculosis case rate has increased five to ten-fold since the identification of HIV. Without proper treatment, an estimated 90 percent of persons living with HIV die within months after contracting tuberculosis. The initiation of highly active antiretroviral therapy in persons coinfected with tuberculosis can cause an immune reconstitution inflammatory syndrome with a worsening, in some cases severe worsening, of tuberculosis infection and symptoms.

An estimated 874,000 people in Sub-Saharan Africa were living with both HIV and tuberculosis in 2011, with 330,000 in South Africa, 83,000 in Mozambique, 50,000 in Nigeria, 47,000 in Kenya, and 46,000 in Zimbabwe. In terms of cases per 100,000 population, Eswatini's rate of 1,010 per 100,000, or approximately 1%, was by far the highest in 2011.

In the following 20 African countries, the cases-per-100,000 coinfection rate increased at least 20 percent between 2000 and 2011: Algeria, Angola, Chad, Comoros, Republic of the Congo, Democratic Republic of the Congo, Equatorial Guinea, The Gambia, Lesotho, Liberia, Mauritania, Mauritius, Morocco, Mozambique, Senegal, Sierra Leone, South Africa, Eswatini, Togo, and Tunisia.

Since 2004, tuberculosis-related deaths among people living with HIV have fallen by 28 percent in Sub-Saharan Africa, which is home to nearly 80 percent of the people worldwide who are living with both diseases.

Country	Concurrent HIV/Tuberculosis infections, 2011 (cases per 100,000 population)	Concurrent HIV/Tuberculosis infections, 2011 (cases)	Concurrent HIV/Tuberculosis infections, 2000 (cases per 100,000 population)	Concurrent HIV/Tuberculosis infections, 2000 (cases)
North Africa
Algeria	1	360	0.3	100
Egypt	<0.1	43	<0.1	56
Libya	3.4	220	not available	not available
Morocco	0.9	300	0.4	110
Sudan	8.2	2,800	9.3	3,200
Tunisia	0.6	66	0.6	53
Horn of Africa
Djibouti	63	570	86	730
Eritrea	8.2	440	20	750
Ethiopia	45	38,000	141	93,000
Somalia	22	2,100	27	2,000
Central Africa
Angola	43	8,500	44	6,100
Cameroon	93	19,000	130	20,000
Central African Republic	159	7,100	591	22,000
Chad	45	5,200	51	4,200
Congo	119	4,900	126	3,900
Democratic Republic of the Congo	49	34,000	57	28,000
Equatorial Guinea	52	370	47	250
Gabon	185	2,800	203	2,500
São Tomé and Príncipe	9	15	9.7	14
Eastern Africa
Burundi	30	2,600	121	7,700
Comoros	1.4	11	0	<10
Kenya	113	47,000	149	47,000
Madagascar	0.6	130	0.8	120
Mauritius	1.6	21	1.1	13
Mayotte	not available	not available	not available	not available
Réunion	not available	not available	not available	not available
Rwanda	27	2,900	141	11,000
Seychelles	5.8	<10	not available	not available
South Sudan	not available	not available	not available	not available
Tanzania	65	30,000	106	36,000
Uganda	102	35,000	244	59,000
Western Africa
Benin	12	1,100	20	1,300
Burkina Faso	9.5	1,600	22	2,700
Cape Verde	19	97	19	84
Côte d'Ivoire	50	10,000	155	26,000
Gambia	45	800	18	230
Ghana	18	4,600	47	9,000
Guinea	47	4,800	58	4,900
Guinea-Bissau	99	1,500	25	310
Liberia	31	1,300	33	940
Mali	9.4	1,500	16	1,800
Mauritania	43	1,500	21	550
Niger	11	1,700	18	2,000
Nigeria	30	50,000	42	52,000
Senegal	14	1,700	7.9	750
Sierra Leone	64	3,800	20	810
Togo	16	1,000	18	840
Southern Africa
Botswana	292	5,900	611	11,000
Lesotho	481	11,000	425	8,300
Malawi	114	18,000	324	36,000
Mozambique	347	83,000	279	51,000
Namibia	359	8,400	787	15,000
South Africa	650	330,000	317	140,000
Eswatini	1,010	12,000	607	6,500
Zambia	285	38,000	493	50,000
Zimbabwe	360	46,000	666	83,000

== Works ==
- 28: Stories of AIDS in Africa

== See also ==
- Demographics of Africa
- The Global Fund to Fight AIDS, Tuberculosis and Malaria
- HIV/AIDS in Malawi
- President's Emergency Plan for AIDS Relief, PEPFAR program
- South African model of the pandemic
- Syphilis in Africa
- United Nations Special Envoy for HIV/AIDS in Africa
- Leopold Zekeng

=== International ===
- HIV/AIDS in Asia
- HIV/AIDS in Australia
- HIV/AIDS in Europe
- HIV/AIDS in North America
- HIV/AIDS in South America
