= HIV/AIDS in Botswana =

Botswana is experiencing one of the most severe HIV/AIDS epidemics in the world. The national HIV prevalence rate among adults ages 15 to 49 is 24.8 percent, which is the third highest in the world, behind Lesotho and Eswatini. HIV/AIDS threatens the many developmental gains Botswana has achieved since its independence in 1966, including economic growth, political stability, a rise in life expectancy, and the establishment of functioning public educational and health care systems.

The prevalence and impact of HIV/AIDS in Botswana is notoriously hard to estimate. For example, it was in 2006 calculated that high HIV infection rates should cause slight annual population decline. However the 2011 census showed robust population growth averaging 1.9% per year since the previous census in 2001.

== Prevalence ==
Botswana is in general well-equipped and with strong infrastructure to test the population for HIV, meaning that the prevalence may in fact be on par with other African nations, whilst being reported as being the nation with the second highest HIV prevalence rates in the world. The primary mode of transmission is heterosexual contact, with the military and young women at higher risk of HIV infection than other sectors of the population. Young women (ages 15–24) who have HIV in Botswana outnumber young men with HIV by more than two-to-one. The national incidence rate is 1.5 per cent, or more than 15,000 new infections per year. HIV infection rates vary by geographical region: They are highest in cities, lower in towns, and lowest in villages. Extended families and communities have exhibited resourcefulness and generosity in their willingness to absorb and care for orphaned children, but this capacity is being exhausted, especially as the current generation of grandparents begins to die. Although the country has been somewhat effective in fighting HIV, it remains particularly prevalent in eastern regions such as Bobirwa and Selebi Phikwe, where the prevalence remains as high as 40%.

== Efforts to control ==
Following the first reported case of HIV in Botswana in 1985, the country's response was mainly focused on screening blood to eliminate the risk of transmission through transfusion. Public spending on tackling HIV/AIDS was minimal by today's standards and remained so until 1997. Consequently, while life expectancy in Botswana stood at 65 years in 1990, it was estimated to have fallen to 57 years by 1997 and to just 35 years in 2005. However, after the 2011 census life expectancy was revised upwards to 54.5 years. In 1997, the government of Quett Masire outlined a 'national vision' (Vision 2016) to outline the country's long-term aims. It stated that "By the year 2016, the spread of the HIV virus that causes AIDS will have stopped, so that there will be no new infections by the virus in that year."

Since 1997, the government has been significantly more proactive in combating the epidemic. Under the governments of Festus Mogae, a programme was introduced in 1999 for the Prevention of Mother-to-Child Transmission (PMTCT). In August 2000, the Gates Foundation, with the Harvard AIDS Initiative and the pharmaceutical companies Merck and Bristol-Myers Squibb, started an HIV/AIDS treatment program, working with the government. The program's target was to treat every citizen of Botswana infected with HIV/AIDS. In addition, anti-retrovirals (ARVs) would be given out to those who were at an advanced stage of the disease. However, Botswana lacked adequate health-care workers and a stable medical infrastructure to implement the program. In 2003, the government introduced the first National Strategic Framework against AIDS. In 2004, with adult HIV prevalence at nearly 40 percent nationwide, the government introduced routine HIV testing for citizens. By 2008, spending on Botswana's response to HIV/AIDS had risen to US$340 million, of which approximately two-thirds was provided by Botswana's central government (a significantly higher proportion than in other sub-Saharan nations).

In 2011, the Ministry of Education introduced new HIV/AIDS education technology for schools. The TeachAIDS prevention software, developed at Stanford University, was distributed to every primary, secondary, and tertiary educational institution in the country, reaching all learners from 6 to 24 years of age. There is evidence that these policies are having some impact, for example HIV prevalence among 15- to 19-year-olds fell from 24.7 percent in 2001 to 13.2 percent in 2009. However, at the household level, families face increasing health expenditures to meet the needs of family members with HIV/AIDS. At the same time, they are experiencing loss of income as productive family members become sick and die.

Botswana's workforce is being depleted as many productive adults develop AIDS and are no longer able to work. According to the US State Department, between 1999 and 2005 Botswana lost approximately 17 percent of its health care workforce due to AIDS. By 2020, it has been projected that the loss in agricultural labour force due to AIDS could be more than 23 percent.

== See also ==
- AIDS pandemic
- HIV/AIDS in Africa
- Joint United Nations Programme on HIV/AIDS
