= Actuarial Society of South Africa HIV/AIDS models =

Mathematical models used for epidemiology

The Actuarial Society of South Africa HIV/AIDS models, also known as ASSA AIDS models, are a series of mathematical models developed to assist the actuarial profession and the Actuarial Society of South Africa in assessing and addressing the impact of the HIV and AIDS epidemic in South Africa. The models have been developed by the AIDS Committee of the Society and the Center for Actuarial Research (CARe) at the University of Cape Town in Cape Town, South Africa.

== Models ==
In 1996 the first and earliest version of ASSA AIDS model ASSA500 was developed by the AIDS Committee of the society,

A red ribbon use as logo of ASSA AIDS Committee

While the ASSA2008 model is the most recent version of ASSA AIDS and demographic model which was released in March 2011. The models have assisted insurers and those insured to have fair and balanced insurance policies in a country ravaged by AIDS.

A joint task team of the South African National Department of Health and the Treasury used the ASSA model to estimate the impact of extending the life of AIDS patients.

ASSA is one of only two models used in South Africa; both are capable of making projections on the progression of the epidemic through an interaction of many factors. Four population risk groups are included, along with assumptions about sexual behaviour, rates of infection, conception rates, the median duration to mortality of those with HIV/AIDS, and the rates of transmission between mother and child. The impact of drug treatments at birth and while nursing, enhanced STD treatment, and risk avoidance is projected by a lower rate scenario The model makes provisions for migration of the population, separate modeling of racial groups, and separate modeling of provincial populations.

A study by the South African National Department of Health and the Treasury used the ASSA model to project a positive result for the increased implementation of antiretroviral drugs (ARV) in the country, although their cost is a problem.
