= Leopold Zekeng =

Cameroonian immunologist and microbiologist

Leopold Achengui Zekeng is an immunologist, microbiologist and global health advocate, currently serving as the Country Director of the Joint United Nations Programme on HIV and AIDS (UNAIDS) in Nigeria. With four decades of experience in HIV and AIDS Resource mobilization, leading and managing teams, mentoring and coaching, research, policy development, and international program implementation, he has contributed significantly to public health efforts across Sub-Saharan Africa.

== Scientific contributions ==
In 1994, Zekeng and his research team in Cameroon identified a highly divergent strain of HIV-1, later designated MVP-5180. This strain exhibited unique genetic and immunologic properties that rendered it undetectable by most standard HIV tests at the time. Sequencing of its genome revealed that MVP-5180 shared only 65% genetic similarity with typical HIV-1 strains and 56% with HIV-2, placing it evolutionarily closer to the divergence point between HIV-1 and HIV-2.

Serological testing in Cameroon revealed that approximately 8% of HIV-positive individuals were reactive to MVP-5180 antigens. Along with another isolate from Cameroon (ANT-70), this strain was later classified as part of HIV-1 Group O (for "Outlier"), a distinct and previously unrecognized group of the Virus.

This discovery highlighted the significant genetic diversity of HIV in West Central Africa and had global implications for diagnostics, vaccine development, and epidemiological surveillance. Zekeng's work led to the redesign of diagnostic protocols to account for Group O and other non-M subtypes.

== UNAIDS Country Leadership ==
Zekeng has served as the UNAIDS Country Director or held an equivalent leadership role in five countries:

UNAIDS Country Director Roles
Country	Years	Position	Reference
Sierra Leone	2005–2007	Country Coordinator/Director	
Liberia	2005–2007	Country Director	
Ghana	2007–2012	Country Director	
Tanzania	2017–2022	Country Director	
Nigeria	2022–present	Country Director	

== Selected publications and media appearances ==
- Zekeng, L. (2023). "Leveraging communities’ leadership to end AIDS in Nigeria." The Guardian Nigeria.
- "UNAIDS advocates equal access to HIV treatments, services." The Guardian Nigeria (11 July 2023).
- UNAIDS feature: "Nigeria’s Monkeypox response gains from HIV experience." (24 August 2022).
- NewDawn Nigeria: "To end AIDS, protect everyone's human rights." (1 Dec 2024).

== See also ==
- UNAIDS
- HIV/AIDS in Nigeria
- List of African educators, scientists and scholars
