= HIV/AIDS in Namibia =

HIV/AIDS in Namibia is a critical public health issue. HIV has been the leading cause of death in Namibia since 1996, but its prevalence has dropped by over 70 percent in the years from 2006 to 2015. While the disease has declined in prevalence, Namibia still has some of the highest rates of HIV of any country in the world. As of 2024, 9 percent of the adult population between the ages of 15 and 49 are infected with HIV. Namibia had been able to recover slightly from the peak of the AIDS epidemic in 2002. At the heart of the epidemic, AIDS caused the country's live expectancy to decline from 61 years in 1991 to 49 years in 2001. Since then, the life expectancy has rebounded with men living an average of 60 years and women living an average of 69 years

This increase in life expectancy is attributed to better sexual health education and an increased use of antiretroviral therapy in the infected population. Aid organisations and the Namibian government have worked together to increase the use of Anti-retroviral therapy (ART) by those infected. In 2016 an estimated 64% of HIV positive people in Namibia are on ART, a number that has been rising by more than 3% a year since 2010.

However, the HIV epidemic still continues to affect the country in a large way. Close to 17 per cent of Namibia's children under the age of 18 are orphaned by at least one parent – mostly due to HIV.

== Disease spread ==
One of the reasons the disease is spread so easily is due to those who contracted the disease not knowing that they are HIV-positive and therefore not taking the proper precautions to prevent further transmission. It is common for people not to know about their HIV status because getting tested is stigmatized in Namibian society. Other reasons for the high transmission rates of the disease in Namibia are attributed to alcohol use and poverty. According to a study, it is more difficult to make the right decision about condom use when alcohol is involved making it easier for individuals to spread the virus. According to a report released from the Institute for Health Metrics and Evaluation, women are more likely to contract the disease than men are. One explanation for this disparity leads back to the idea that there are not as many opportunities for Namibian women to make money compared to that of Namibian men. This can lead to women participating in sexual acts in exchange for capital. The area of Namibia with the largest population of HIV positive individuals is the capital of Zambezi Region, Katima Mulio.

=== 1990s ===
Though the disease was not prevalent in Namibia until the mid-1990s, the first sighting of the disease occurred in the late 1980s. There were two common ways to contract HIV during the 1990s in Namibia. The disease is transferred between a man and woman as well as the transmission from a mother to a child. HIV contracted during heterosexual intercourse is most often due to unprotected sex. However, numerous organisations in Namibia have implemented programs promoting the importance of condom use which has contributed significantly in fighting against the spread of the disease. Pregnant women who are HIV-positive have a high possibility of passing the disease on to their children. For this reason, breast-feeding is often not recommended. The number of people with HIV in Namibia skyrocketed between 1990 and 1998 resulting in a substantial decline in life expectancy among both male and females in the early 2000s.

=== 2000s ===
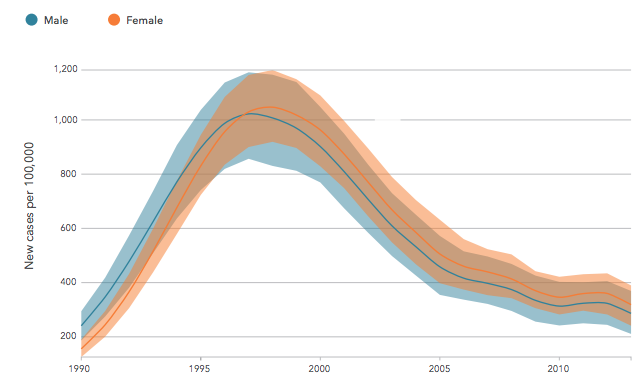
New cases of HIV/AIDS per 100,000 people for males and female, 1990-2013

In 2001, the number of people living in Namibia with AIDS reached 230,000. After 2002, a minor decrease in HIV prevalence is evident. However, by 2005, the deaths caused by HIV/AIDS were at an all-time high. This decline can be attributed to several factors, one including women aged 15-24 who have multiple sex partners using condom at an increasing rate between the years 2000 and 2006.

The number of new cases for HIV slowly declined with only 11,000 new infections in 2014, compared to the year 2000 when there were 21,000 new cases of HIV annually. The decrease in the number of people with newly contracted HIV infections is primarily due to the availability of treatment options. Though the number of cases of those newly infected has decreased over the years, HIV is still responsible for the majority of deaths in Namibia today. Namibia has implemented numerous services to inform citizens of ways to treat and prevent the illness through working with organisations such as UNAIDS and WHO. These services have contributed to HIV awareness and continues to work towards eliminating the spread of the disease. The National Strategic Framework for HIV/AIDS (NSF) outlines the country’s goal of making treatment a more affordable and aggressive treatment for those with HIV. The NSF predicted that by 2017 a majority of people needing treatment for HIV would have access to necessary resources.

== Government programmes ==
=== Surveys ===
To determine prevalence, the Namibian government conducts a bi-annual serological survey among pregnant women, ages 15–49. The survey is done anonymously during routine antenatal care visits, which means that the results cannot be linked to anyone.

In 2008, Namibia had an HIV prevalence rate of 17.8% in adults ages 15 to 49, which is lower than 19.9% in 2006. However, the figure is still quite distressing. The peak occurred in 2002 when Namibia's prevalence hit 22%. The most recent survey (2008) further indicates that HIV prevalence is highest at 27% in the 30- to 34-year-old age group and is at its lowest (5.1%) among women aged 15–19 years. In response to this information, the Namibian Ministry of Health and Social Services recommended that prevention measures be intensified, that HIV/AIDS components be main-streamed into all development projects, that more Namibians be encouraged to use voluntary counselling and testing services, and that antiretroviral treatment be expanded to all parts of the country, especially the rural areas.

Data compiled by the Ministry of Health and Social Services show that AIDS became the leading cause of death in Namibia in 1996. It is estimated that AIDS accounts for at least half of all deaths among individuals ages 15 to 49. However, there is great variation in HIV prevalence rates from region to region in Namibia. Infection rates also differ by gender, with UNAIDS estimating that women account for 58 percent of all HIV infections.

=== Treatment ===
Namibia is the second most sparsely populated country in the world. Providing comprehensive HIV/AIDS services to the mostly rural population requires a fully decentralized, community-based approach with strong policies and leadership from the central level. Insufficient numbers of skilled technical personnel and limited managerial capacity at all levels have exacerbated the challenges of decentralization, and access to services remains limited for those living in sparsely populated areas. As the country with one of the highest levels of income disparity in the world, poverty and household nutrition pose major challenges. Yet, by the end of 2007, some 52,000 people in Namibia were receiving anti-retroviral therapy to combat HIV. At the same time, mother-to-child transmission has also fallen dramatically – starting from just two hospitals in 2002. This is one of Namibia's greatest success stories of modern times.

=== Orphan care and support ===
Namibia's Ministry of Gender Equality and Social Welfare works closely with various development partners, non-governmental organizations and faith-based groups to implement the National Plan of Action for Orphans and Vulnerable Children.

There are many organizations working in Namibia to provide services to orphans and vulnerable children. Two of the larger organizations are the Catholic AIDS Action (CAA) and the Church Alliance for Orphans (CAFO).

Although data on contribution of various development partners is inadequate, the US government's contribution is especially significant. Its PEPFAR program has allocated approximately $158 million for care and support to orphans and vulnerable children in Namibia since 2004. In 2007, 78,700 children received at least some assistance, although the total number of orphans is estimated to be about 250,000. (This number does include vulnerable children who are not orphans, which renders the total number of needy children much higher.)
