= Leader of the House (Botswana) =

Parliamentary office in Botswana

- Incumbent; Moeti Mohwasa since 19 November 2024
- National Assembly of Botswana
- Style: The Honourable
- Appointer: President of Botswana
- Formation: 1965
- First holder: Quett Masire

The Leader of the House is the minister responsible for the arrangement of government business in the National Assembly of Botswana. The Leader of the House serves as the primary link between the executive and the legislature.

The current Leader of the House is Moeti Mohwasa, Minister for State President, Defence and Security, who has served since 2024.

== Role and functions ==
The duties of the Leader of the House include selecting public bills and policies to be presented before Parliament, arranging government business in the House, moving procedural motions relating to the business of the House and responding on behalf of the President to the debate on the State of the Nation Address when instructed to do so by the President. The Leader of the House is also responsible for communicating with the Speaker on proposed dates of prorogation or dissolution of the House as determined by the President and for chairing All-Party Caucus meetings or briefings connected with government business.

By virtue of office, the Leader of the House is a member of the Business Advisory Committee. The Business Advisory Committee consists of the Speaker as chairperson, the Leader of the House, the Leader of the Opposition, the Government Whip and the Opposition Whip. The committee considers proposed amendments to the Standing Orders, recommends allocation of debating time for major business such as the State of the Nation Address, appropriation bills and national development plans, prepares business forecasts, prioritises business, and presents forecasts and resolutions to the All-Party Caucus.

Where the Leader of the House is absent, ill or otherwise unavailable, the President is required to designate another minister in writing to discharge the duties of the office.

== History ==
The office has existed since the 1st Parliament elected before Botswana's independence. Quett Masire was the first Leader of the House, serving from 1965 to 1980. The current officeholder is Moeti Mohwasa following the 2024 Botswana general election which saw the Umbrella for Democratic Change form government.

By convention, the vice-president or Minster for State President holds the post of Leader of the House.

== Officeholders ==
Botswana Democratic Party Botswana National Front (UDC)

Leaders of the House of Botswana
No.	Name	Took office	Left office	Party
1	Quett Masire	1965	1980	Botswana Democratic Party
2	Lenyeletse Seretse	1980	1983	Botswana Democratic Party
3	Peter Mmusi	1983	1992	Botswana Democratic Party
4	Festus Mogae	1992	1998	Botswana Democratic Party
5	Daniel Kwelagobe	1998	2004	Botswana Democratic Party
6	Mompati Merafhe	2004	2008	Botswana Democratic Party
7	Lesego Motsumi	2008	2009	Botswana Democratic Party
8	Mompati Merafhe	2009	2012	Botswana Democratic Party
9	Ponatshego Kedikilwe	2012	2014	Botswana Democratic Party
10	Mokgweetsi Masisi	2014	2018	Botswana Democratic Party
11	Slumber Tsogwane	2018	2024	Botswana Democratic Party
12	Moeti Mohwasa	2024	Incumbent	Botswana National Front (UDC)

== See also ==
- National Assembly of Botswana
- Leader of the Opposition (Botswana)
- Speaker of the National Assembly of Botswana
- Politics of Botswana
