= 2017 in Botswana =

- Decades: 1990s; 2000s; 2010s; 2020s
- See also: Other events of 2017; Timeline of Botswana history

Events in the year 2017 in Botswana.

== Incumbents ==
- President: Ian Khama
- Vice President: Mokgweetsi Masisi

== Events ==
- 3 April – An earthquake of magnitude 6.5 occurred in the Central District of Botswana.
- In September 2017, the Botswana High Court ruled that the refusal of the Registrar of National Registration to change a transgender man's gender marker was "unreasonable and violated his constitutional rights to dignity, privacy, freedom of expression, equal protection of the law, freedom from discrimination and freedom from inhumane and degrading treatment". LGBT activists celebrated the ruling, describing it as a great victory. At first, the Botswana Government announced it would appeal the ruling, but decided against it in December, supplying the trans man with a new identity document that reflects his gender identity.

A similar case, where a transgender woman sought to change her gender marker to female, was heard in December 2017. The High Court ruled that the Government must recognise her gender identity. She dedicated her victory to "every single trans diverse person in Botswana".

== Deaths ==
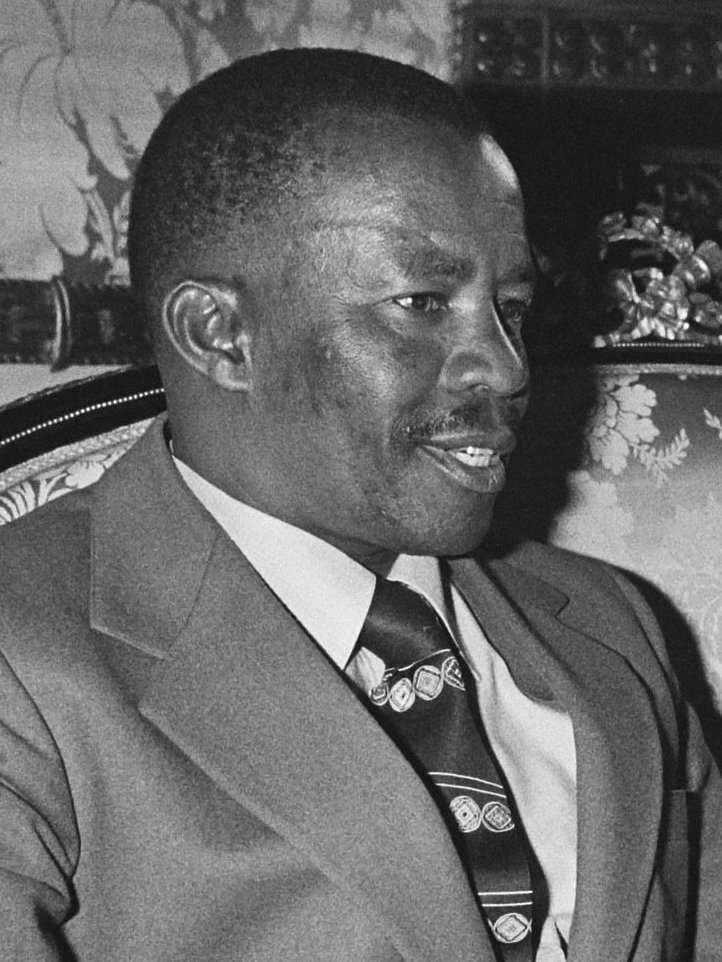
Quett Masire

- 28 April – Gofaone Tiro, footballer.
- 29 April – Herbert Nkabiti, boxer (b. 1981).
- 22 June – Quett Masire, politician (b. 1925)
