= 2014 in Botswana =

- Decades: 1990s; 2000s; 2010s; 2020s
- See also: Other events of 2014; Timeline of Botswana history

The following lists events that happened during 2014 in Botswana.

== Incumbents ==
- President: Ian Khama
- Vice President: Ponatshego Kedikilwe (until 12 November), Mokgweetsi Masisi (starting 12 November)

== Events ==
=== February ===
- February 19 - Botswana ends diplomatic relations with North Korea following a United Nations report on the latter's human rights record.

=== October ===
- October 24 - Voters in Botswana go to the polls for a general election with the ruling Botswana Democratic Party of President Ian Khama winning 33 of 57 seats.
