= Barbara Mogae =

First Lady of Botswana from 1998 to 2008

Barbara Gemma Mogae
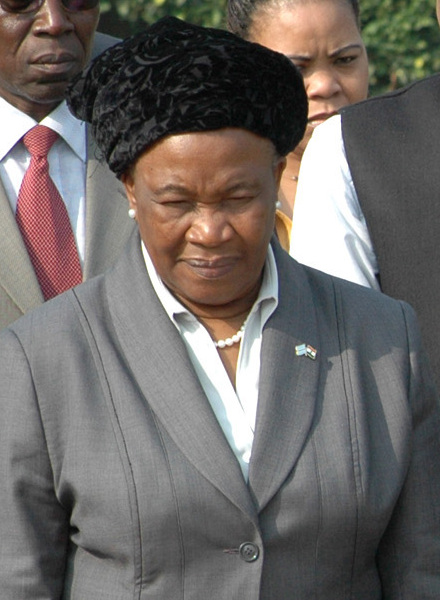
- Mogae in 2006

First Lady of Botswana
- In role 1 April 1998 – 1 April 2008
- President: Festus Mogae
- Preceded by: Gladys Olebile Masire
- Succeeded by: Neo Masisi (2018)

Personal details
- Born: Barbara Gemma Modise
- Party: Botswana Democratic Party
- Spouse: Festus Mogae (m. 1967; died 2026)
- Children: Nametso; Chedza; Boikaego

Barbara Gemma Mogae is a Motswana public figure and politician who served as the third First Lady of Botswana from 1998 until 2008. She was the wife of former President Festus Mogae until his death in May 2026.

== Biography ==
Mogae was born Barbara Gemma Modise. She married her husband, Festus Mogae, in 1967. The couple have three daughters born between 1969 and 1987 namely Nametso, Chedza and Boikaego.

=== First Lady ===
Barbara Mogae served as the country's third First Lady from 1998 until 2008.

=== Honors ===
On 29 September 2016 Mogae was honored with the Golden Jubilee Presidential Order of Honour Award by President Ian Khama as one of the "Builders of Botswana." Other recipients included her husband, Festus Mogae; posthumous honors for the late former First Ladies Ruth Williams Khama and Gladys Olebile Masire; the late former President Seretse Khama, former President Quett Masire; and the 28 members of the country's first, post-independence Parliament.
