= Mompati Merafhe =

6th vice-president of Botswana from 2008 to 2012

Lieutenant General Mompati Merafhe
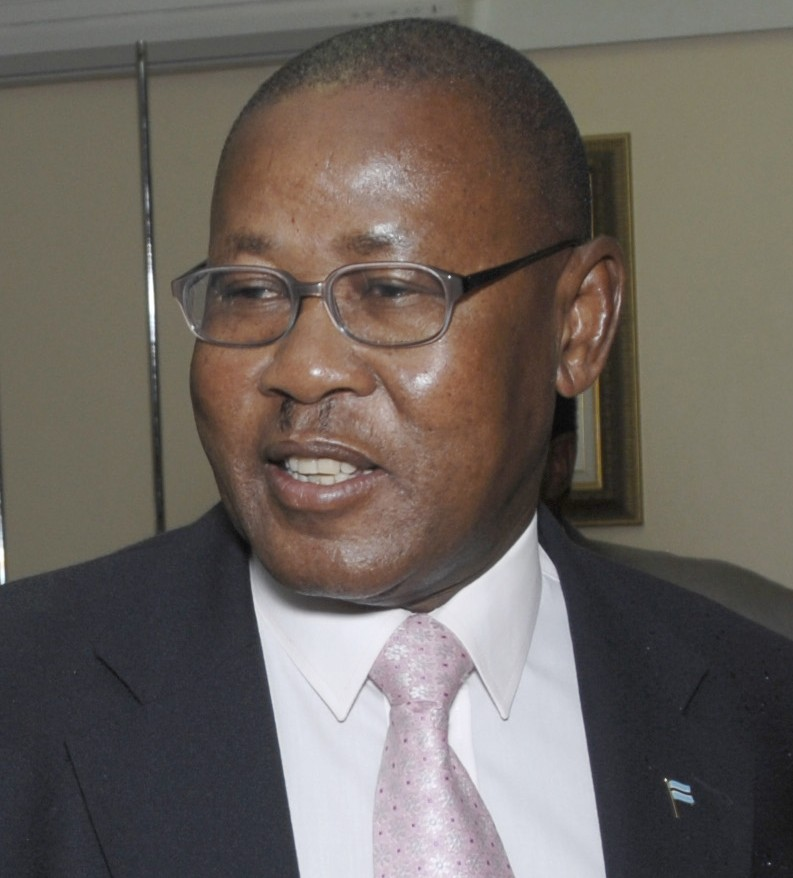
- Mompati Merafhe at Gaborone in 2007

6th Vice President of Botswana
- In office 1 April 2008 – 31 July 2012
- President: Ian Khama
- Preceded by: Ian Khama
- Succeeded by: Ponatshego Kedikilwe

Minister of Foreign Affairs of Botswana
- In office 25 October 1994 – 1 April 2008
- President: Quett Masire, Festus Mogae
- Preceded by: Gaositwe K. T. Chiepe
- Succeeded by: Phandu Skelemani

Personal details
- Born: 6 June 1936 Serowe, Bechuanaland Protectorate, now Botswana
- Died: 7 January 2015 (aged 78) Gaborone, Botswana
- Party: BDP

Mompati Sebogodi Merafhe (6 June 1936 – 7 January 2015) was a Motswana politician who was Vice-President of Botswana from 2008 to 2012. He was a retired Lieutenant-General and served as Minister of Foreign Affairs from 1994 to 2008.

== Biography ==
Merafhe was born on 6 June in Serowe in 1936. After receiving his secondary education at Moeng College, Merafhe joined the then Bechuanaland Protectorate Police Force in 1960 and gradually rose through the ranks. In 1971 he became the commander of the Police Mobile Unit, becoming the first citizen to occupy such a position. When Botswana formed the Botswana Defense Force (BDF) in 1977, Merafhe was selected by President Sir Seretse Khama as its first commander at the rank of Major-General. He was elevated to Lieutenant-General in 1986.

Merafhe was a commander of the BDF, working closely with his second-in-command Ian Khama to develop its ability to police the borders, deter poaching of the country's wildlife resources, and to establish an air arm.

Due to his success in building up the nascent BDF into an effective and well-respected force, President Quett Masire decided to entice him into politics in 1989. Masire viewed Merafhe as a potential successor, but the former general's continued involvement in factional party infighting meant that he was bypassed for the vice presidency in 1992.

Between 1995 and 2002, Merafhe served as a member of the Inter-Parliamentary Human Rights Network and the Commonwealth Ministerial Action Group (CMAG).

He was first elected to the Central Committee of the Botswana Democratic Party (BDP) in 1991 and remained on the body until ill-health forced his retirement in 2012. After being specially elected in 1989, Merafhe became the Member of Parliament for Mahalapye West in the 1994 election. He was elected for a third time in the October 2004 general election, receiving 5,429 votes against 1,664 for Abigail Mogalakwe of the Botswana National Front (BNF) and 975 for Thomas Ookeditse of the Botswana Congress Party (BCP). Besides serving as Foreign Minister, he also served a period as Minister of Presidential Affairs and Public Administration.

When Ian Khama took office as President on 1 April 2008, he appointed Merafhe as Vice-President. Merafhe was approved as Vice-President by Parliament on the same day, receiving 48 out of 56 votes, with no votes against, two spoiled votes, and six abstentions; he was immediately sworn in. The same day, Khama explained to the BDP caucus that he did not intend for Merafhe to ultimately succeed him as President; he envisioned eventually replacing Merafhe with another Vice-President who would in turn succeed Khama in 2018. Merafhe was not given a ministerial portfolio as Vice-President, although it was suggested that he might be tasked with project implementation across ministries.

Merafhe was married and had five children.

Following the second round of the Zimbabwean presidential election in June 2008, Merafhe said that the election was flawed and that Zimbabwe should be barred from participation in regional talks. On 22 July 2009, he was appointed to the BDP Central Committee by President Khama; he was one of five individuals appointed to that body by Khama.

Merafhe retired on 31 July 2012 and Ponatshego Kedikilwe was sworn in to succeed him as Vice-President on 1 August. He died on the morning of 7 January 2015 at the age of 78 after years of health complications.

=== Gallery ===
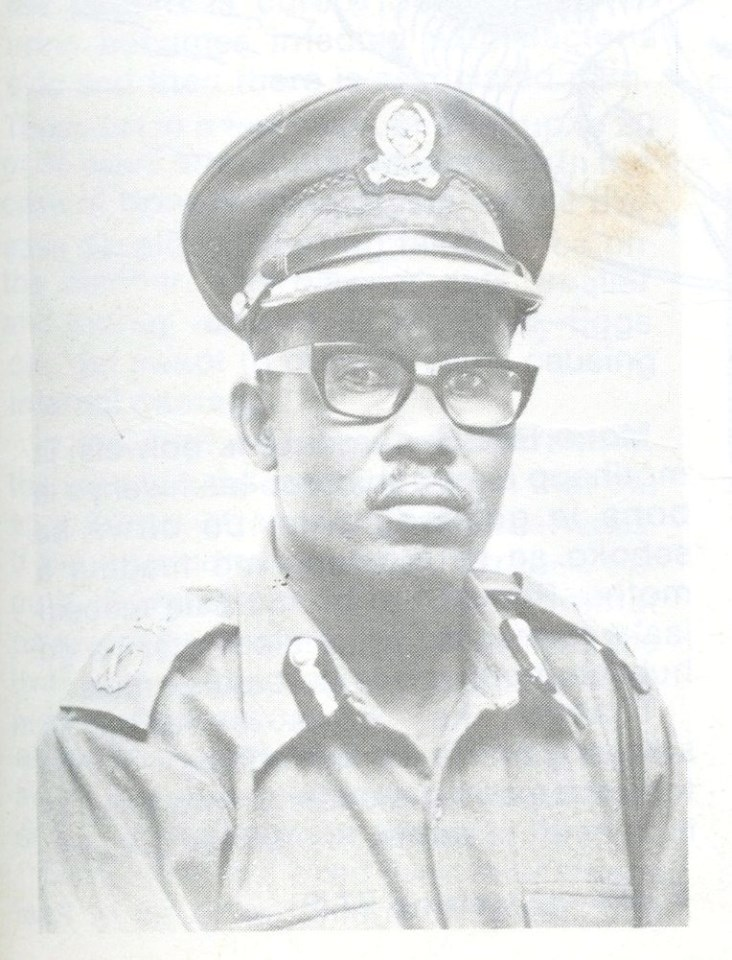
Former Major General of the Botswana Defence Force.

== Awards and honours ==
Botswana highest honour dubbed Naledi ya Botswana in 2011.

Political offices
Preceded by Gaositwe K.T. Chiepe	Foreign Minister of Botswana; 1994–2008	Succeeded by Phandu Skelemani
Preceded by Ian Khama	Vice-President of Botswana; 2008–2012	Succeeded by Ponatshego Kedikilwe
