= Moeti Mohwasa =

Motswana politician (born 1969)

The Honourable Moeti Mohwasa MP

Minister for State President, Defence and Security
- Incumbent
- Assumed office 18 November 2024
- President: Duma Boko

Leader of the House
- Incumbent
- Assumed office 19 November 2024
- Preceded by: Slumber Tsogwane

Specially-elected Member of Parliament
- Incumbent
- Assumed office 6 November 2024

Vice President of the Botswana National Front
- Incumbent
- Assumed office 23 July 2025
- President: Duma Boko
- Preceded by: Micus Chimbombi

Personal details
- Born: Moeti Caesar Mohwasa; 30 September 1969 (age 56) Botswana
- Party: Botswana National Front
- Other political affiliations: Umbrella for Democratic Change

Moeti Caesar Mohwasa (born 30 September 1969) is a Motswana politician who has served as Botswana's Minister for State President, Defence and Security and Leader of the House since 2024.

A member of the Botswana National Front (BNF) he entered the 13th Parliament in November 2024 as one of the country's specially elected Members of Parliament.

Before entering government, Mohwasa was bes as a long-serving BNF and UDC spin doctor. He served as BNF publicity secretary, BNF secretary-general, and head of communications for the UDC. In July 2025, he was elected vice president of the BNF.

== Early life ==
Mohwasa is the youngest of eight children and a father of five. His father was from Matjitjileng in Limpopo, South Africa, while his mother was from Serowe, Botswana. Both of his parents were primary school teachers. Mohwasa lost his parents in a car accident when he was five and was raised by his maternal grandmother, whom he later described as a strict Christian and disciplinarian.

Mohwasa has said that he became politically attached to the BNF at the age of eight after encountering a BNF rally in Selebi-Phikwe. He also cited the influence of labour grievances at the BCL mine in Selebi-Phikwe, saying that conversations with mine workers shaped his sympathy for workers and vulnerable people.

== Political career ==
=== BNF and UDC activism ===
Mohwasa became BNF spokesperson in 2005 at the party's national congress in Ledumang. By 2010, he was serving as BNF publicity secretary, but announced that he would not contest that year's central committee elections, saying he wished to attend to personal matters and hand over the role to another candidate.

He later held several BNF offices, including deputy chairperson and chairperson of the party's Youth League in the Selebi-Phikwe constituency, member of the National Elections Appeals Board, chair of the BNF 45th and 50th anniversary celebration committees, and information and publicity secretary. He became BNF secretary-general in 2016. In that role he was also associated with the UDC's communications operation and was UDC head of communications since 2022.

As secretary-general, Mohwasa argued that the BNF needed a full-time and better-resourced secretariat, saying that the party should be careful not to let its organisational machinery weaken if the UDC entered government.

=== 2014 parliamentary election ===
Mohwasa stood for the UDC in Selebi-Phikwe West at the 2014 Botswana general election. During the campaign, UDC leader Duma Boko launched Mohwasa as the party's parliamentary candidate for the constituency. Mohwasa finished third, receiving 1,215 votes behind Dithapelo Keorapetse of the Botswana Congress Party, who won with 4,247 votes, and Opelo Makhandlela of the Botswana Democratic Party, who received 3,187 votes.

=== In government ===
After the UDC won the 2024 Botswana general election, President Duma Boko nominated Mohwasa as one of six specially elected members of the 13th Parliament, alongside Bogolo Kenewendo, Lesego Chombo, Pius Mokgware, Steven Modise and Nono Kgafela-Mokoka.

Mohwasa was sworn in as Minister for State President at the Office of the President in Gaborone on 18 November 2024.

In February 2026, Mohwasa defended the government's proposal for a constitutional court, saying that it was intended to address constitutional and human rights issues broadly rather than specific matters such as same-sex marriage or the death penalty.
