= First Lady of Botswana =

Wife of the president of Botswana

Her Excellency The First Lady of Botswana
- Incumbent; Kaone Boko since 1 November 2024
- Inaugural holder: Ruth Williams Khama
- Formation: September 30, 1966 (59 years ago)

The first lady of the Republic of Botswana is the wife of the president of Botswana. The current first lady is Kaone Boko, the wife of President Duma Boko.

The role is largely ceremonial and has no salary. President Neo Masisi has said that his wife does not have the remit to influence government policies.

== History ==
There was no first lady from 1 April 2008 to 1 April 2018, as President Ian Khama was unmarried. The absence of a first lady was problematic for some official functions, and there were moves to find a substitute for some occasions. President Kharma's unmarried status was controversial because of the requirements of tribal traditions.

== First ladies of Botswana ==
| Name | Portrait | Term began | Term ended | President | Notes |
|---|---|---|---|---|---|
| Ruth Williams Khama | | 30 September 1966 | 13 July 1980 | Seretse Khama | |
| Gladys Olebile Masire | | 13 July 1980 | 31 March 1998 | Quett Masire | |
| Barbara Mogae | | 1 April 1998 | 1 April 2008 | Festus Mogae | |
| Vacant | | 1 April 2008 | 1 April 2018 | Ian Khama | President Ian Khama never married. |
| Neo Masisi | | 1 April 2018 | 1 November 2024 | Mokgweetsi Masisi | |
| Kaone Boko | | 1 November 2024 | Present | Duma Boko | |

== See also ==
- List of heads of state of Botswana
