= 2015 in Botswana =

- Decades: 1990s; 2000s; 2010s; 2020s
- See also: Other events of 2015; Timeline of Botswana history

The following lists events that happened during 2015 in Botswana.

== Incumbents ==
- President: Ian Khama
- Vice President: Mokgweetsi Masisi

== Events ==
=== November ===
- November 16 – The world's second-largest diamond of gem quality, Lesedi La Rona, is found in the Karowe mine located north of Gaborone by the Lucara Diamond Corp.
