= Mmadinare (Botswana constituency) =

Parliamentary constituency in Botswana, 1965 onwards

- Single-member constituency for the National Assembly
- District: Central District
- Population: 30,460
- Major settlements: Mmadinare
- Area: 5,614 km^{2}

Current constituency
- Created: 1965
- Party: UDC
- MP: Ketlhalefile Motshegwa
- Margin of victory: 38 (0.4 pp)

Mmadinare is a constituency in Botswana represented in the National Assembly of Botswana since 2024 by Ketlhalefile Motshegwa, an Umbrella for Democratic Change (UDC) MP since 2024.

== Constituency profile ==
The seat was a stronghold for the Botswana Democratic Party (BDP), consistently delivering large majorities in its favor from its establishment in 1965 until the 2024 Botswana general election, when the Umbrella for Democratic Change (UDC) flipped it to the opposition. This shift was mainly due to a steep collapse in the BDP vote, ending the party’s 58-year grip on the constituency. Notably, the seat had long been considered a safe one for the BDP, particularly for a constituency outside Serowe for instance, it was the safest non-Serowe based seat for the BDP in the country in the 2014 general election. This victory reflected the broader success of the UDC in northern Botswana during the 2024 election, where the BDP was completely locked out of the Central District — historically its strongest region.

The predominantly rural constituency anchored around the mining town of Selebi-Phikwe encompasses the following localities:

1. Mmadinare
2. Sefophe
3. Tobane
4. Tshokwe
5. Robelela
6. Damochojenaa

== Members of Parliament ==
Key: BDP UDC

Election	Winner
1965 election	Amos Dambe
1969 election	Amos Dambe
1974 election	Kebatlamang Morake
1979 election	Kebatlamang Morake
1984 election	Ponatshego Kedikilwe
1989 election	Ponatshego Kedikilwe
1994 election	Ponatshego Kedikilwe
1999 election	Ponatshego Kedikilwe
2004 election	Ponatshego Kedikilwe
2009 election	Ponatshego Kedikilwe
2014 election	Kefentse Mzwinila
2019 election	Molebatsi Molebatsi
2024 election	Ketlhalefile Motshegwa

== Election results ==
=== 2024 election ===
General election 2024: Mmadinare
Party	Candidate	Votes	%	±%
UDC	Ketlhalefile Motshegwa	3,285	30.33	+1.24
BCP	Sennye Obuseng	3,247	29.98	N/A
BDP	Kefentse Mzwinila	2,849	26.31	−23.73
BPF	Jacob Mosimanyana	1,333	12.31	−4.51
BMD	Lame Bothman-Hall	116	1.07	N/A
Margin of victory		38	0.35	N/A
Total valid votes		10,830	98.93	−0.19
Rejected ballots		117	1.07	+0.19
Turnout		10,947	80.63	−1.61
Registered electors		13,577		
UDC gain from BDP		Swing	+15.61	

=== 2019 election ===
General election 2019: Mmadinare
Party	Candidate	Votes	%	±%
BDP	Molebatsi Molebatsi	6,847	50.04	−20.11
UDC	Joseph Bagwasi	3,980	29.09	−0.76
BPF	Felicity Keleeme	2,301	16.82	N/A
AP	Motshereganyi Madingwane	555	4.06	N/A
Margin of victory		2,867	20.95	−19.35
Total valid votes		13,683	99.12	+1.26
Rejected ballots		121	0.88	−1.26
Turnout		13,804	82.54	+1.28
Registered electors		16,725		
BDP hold		Swing	−9.68	

=== 2014 election ===
General election 2014: Mmadinare
Party	Candidate	Votes	%	±%
BDP	Ponatshego Kedikilwe	7,325	70.15	−1.11
BCP	Christopher Motsholapheko	3,117	29.85	+1.11
Margin of victory		4,208	40.30	−2.22
Total valid votes		10,442	97.86	−0.06
Rejected ballots		228	2.14	+0.06
Turnout		10,670	81.26	+4.54
Registered electors		13,131		
BDP hold		Swing	−1.11	

=== 2009 election ===
General election 2009: Mmadinare
Party	Candidate	Votes	%	±%
BDP	Ponatshego Kedikilwe	6,304	71.26	−7.27
BCP	Christopher Motsholapheko	2,542	28.74	+7.27
Margin of victory		3,762	42.52	−14.54
Total valid votes		8,846	97.92	+1.32
Rejected ballots		188	2.08	−1.32
Turnout		9,034	76.72	+6.19
Registered electors		11,776		
BDP hold		Swing	−7.27	

=== 2004 election ===
General election 2004: Mmadinare
Party	Candidate	Votes	%	±%
BDP	Ponatshego Kedikilwe	4,258	78.53	−10.05
BCP	Christopher Motsholapheko	1,137	21.47	N/A
Margin of victory		3,021	57.06	−20.10
Total valid votes		5,295	96.26	+5.64
Rejected ballots		206	3.74	−5.64
Turnout		5,501	70.53	+2.30
Registered electors		7,800		
BDP hold		Swing	−10.05	

=== 1999 election ===
General election 1999: Mmadinare
Party	Candidate	Votes	%	±%
BDP	Ponatshego Kedikilwe	4,398	88.58	+3.17
BNF	R.J. Lesedi	567	11.42	−3.17
Margin of victory		3,831	77.16	+6.34
Total valid votes		4,965	90.62	N/A
Rejected ballots		514	9.38	N/A
Turnout		5,479	68.23	+10.86
Registered electors		8,030		
BDP hold		Swing	+3.17	

=== 1994 election ===
General election 1994: Mmadinare
Party	Candidate	Votes	%	±%
BDP	Ponatshego Kedikilwe	3,871	85.41	−3.89
BNF	Moses Seeletso	661	14.59	+3.89
Margin of victory		3,210	70.82	−7.78
Turnout		4,532	57.37	−14.17
Registered electors		7,900		
BDP hold		Swing	−3.89	

=== 1989 election ===
General election 1989: Mmadinare
Party	Candidate	Votes	%	±%
BDP	Ponatshego Kedikilwe	4,650	89.30	−2.80
BNF	Gabaikitse Kolenyane	557	10.70	+2.80
Margin of victory		4,093	78.60	−5.60
Turnout		5,207	71.54	−8.27
Registered electors		7,278		
BDP hold		Swing	−2.80	

=== 1984 election ===
General election 1984: Mmadinare
Party	Candidate	Votes	%	±%
BDP	Ponatshego Kedikilwe	4,817	92.10	+5.59
BNF	Nicolas Selelo	417	7.90	+2.39
Margin of victory		4,400	84.20	+5.66
Turnout		5,230	79.81	+23.19
Registered electors		6,553		
BDP hold		Swing	+3.99	

=== 1979 election ===
General election 1979: Mmadinare
Party	Candidate	Votes	%
BDP	Kebatlamang Morake	5,068	86.51
BPP	P.K. Pudiephatshwa	467	7.97
BNF	M. Giddie	323	5.51
Margin of victory		4,601	78.54
Turnout		5,858	56.62
Registered electors		10,345	
BDP hold			

=== 1974 election ===
General election 1974: Mmadinare
Party	Candidate	Votes	%	±%
BDP	Kebatlamang Morake	Walkover	N/A	N/A
BDP hold				

=== 1969 election ===
General election 1969: Madinare
Party	Candidate	Votes	%	±%
BDP	Amos Dambe	4,222	96.48	+0.82
BIP	M.L. Mabengano	82	1.87	+0.06
BPP	L. Sentufhe	72	1.65	−0.89
Margin of victory		4,140	94.61	+1.49
Turnout			64.24	−24.4
Registered electors		6,812		
BDP hold		Swing	+0.44	

=== 1965 election ===
General election 1965: Madinare
Party	Candidate	Votes	%
BDP	Amos Dambe	6,144	95.66
BPP	K.J. Letoa	163	2.54
BIP	L. Mabeganu	116	1.81
Margin of victory		5,981	93.12
Turnout		6,423	88.6
Registered electors		N/A	
BDP win (new seat)			
