= Ruth Williams Khama =

First Lady of Botswana from 1966 to 1980

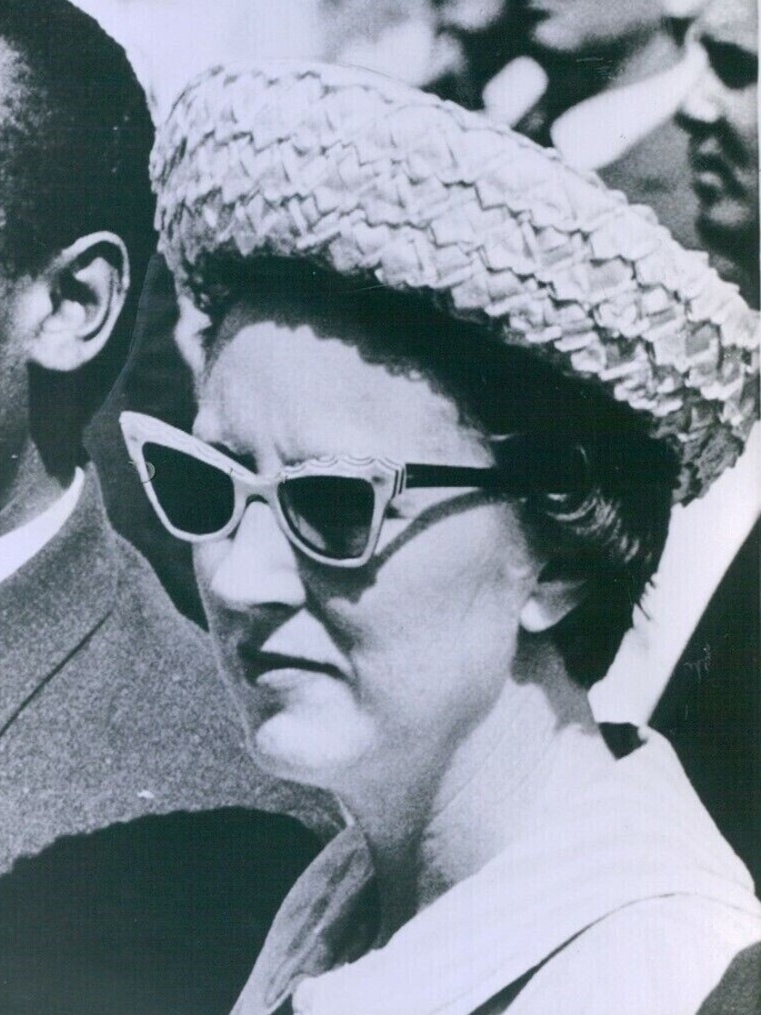
- Khama in 1964

1st First Lady of Botswana
- In role 30 September 1966 – 13 July 1980
- President: Seretse Khama
- Preceded by: Office created
- Succeeded by: Gladys Olebile Masire

Personal details
- Born: Ruth Williams; 9 December 1923 Blackheath, London
- Died: 22 May 2002 (aged 78) Gaborone, Botswana
- Resting place: Royal Cemetery, Serowe, Botswana
- Party: Botswana Democratic Party
- Spouse: Seretse Khama (m. 1948; died 1980)
- Children: Jacqueline Khama; Ian Khama; Tshekedi Khama II; Anthony Khama

Ruth Williams Khama, Lady Khama (née Williams; 9 December 1923 – 22 May 2002) was the wife of Botswana's first president Sir Seretse Khama, the Paramount Chief of its Bamangwato tribe. She served as the inaugural First Lady of Botswana from 1966 to 1980.

== Early life ==
Khama was born in Meadowcourt Road, Blackheath in South London, the daughter of George and Dorothy Williams. Her father had served as a captain in the British Army in India, and later worked in the tea trade. She had a sister, Muriel (later Muriel Sanderson), with whom she remained close.

She was educated at Eltham Hill Grammar School and then served as a WAAF ambulance driver at various airfields in the south of England during the Second World War. After the war, she worked as a clerk for Cuthbert Heath, a firm of underwriters at Lloyd's of London.

== Marriage ==
In June 1947, at a dance at Nutford House organised by the London Missionary Society, her sister introduced her to Prince Seretse Khama. He was the son of the Kgosi (a Bamangwato title equivalent to "king", though the British government prefers "paramount chief"), Sekgoma II, of the Bamangwato people and was studying law at Inner Temple in London after a year at Balliol College, Oxford. The couple were both fans of jazz music, particularly The Ink Spots, and quickly fell in love. Khama was the first black man she had ever spoken to. Their plans to marry caused controversy with elders in Bechuanaland and the government of South Africa, which had recently instituted the system of racial segregation known as apartheid.

Britain was developing an atomic bomb which was felt necessary to maintain Britain's claim to be a great power and it was felt crucial that the supplies of uranium come from within the Commonwealth; South Africa happened to be endowed with much uranium which could be mined cheaply via open pit mining out on the veld by black South African miners who were paid wages considerably lower than the white miners. Uranium could also be obtained elsewhere in the Commonwealth such as from Canada, but the Canadian uranium was mined via deep shaft mining in the far north by well paid miners, making the Canadian uranium far more expensive than the South African uranium. Thus for reasons of cost, the British government much preferred to buy South African uranium for its atomic bomb programme.

The South African government made it very clear that its willingness to supply uranium for the British nuclear programme was contingent upon stopping the marriage. The British government intervened to stop the marriage. Both Ruth and Seretse were Anglicans who wanted to be married within the Church of England, but neither could find a priest willing to marry them. The Bishop of London, William Wand, said he would permit a church wedding only if the government agreed.

The couple married at Kensington Register Office on 29 September 1948. The marriage attracted much media attention as the Canadian journalist Mackenzie Porter wrote in 1952: "The Press treated their marriage as front-page news. Here, flouting all the dangers he knew to be implicit in [inter-racial marriage], was the scion of the ancient and illustrious House of Khama ... And here, seeking to be an African queen, was an English working girl who had been reared to expect nothing more exotic than a semi-detached house in one of London's great dormitories and a husband who every morning would don his bowler hat, seize his umbrella and catch a red double-decker bus to the city." D. F. Malan, then the Prime Minister of South Africa, described their marriage as "nauseating". Julius Nyerere, then a student teacher and later President of Tanzania, said it was "one of the great love stories of the world".

=== Arrival in Bechuanaland ===
The couple returned to Bechuanaland, a British protectorate, where Seretse's uncle Tshekedi Khama was regent. For the Bamangwato people, the wife of the king was regarded as the mother of the entire Bamangwato people, and for Prince Tshekedi it was simply inconceivable that a white woman could play this role. Prince Tshekedi lobbied the British Colonial Office to either force Seretse to renounce his wife or renounce his claim to the throne.

In the 1948 South African elections, the Afrikaner nationalist National Party that had strong republican and anti-British tendencies was victorious, and the fear that Prime Minister Malan might declare South Africa a republic led successive British governments to seek to appease Malan, who made it very clear that he disapproved of the Khamas' marriage. Malan banned both Khamas from South Africa. A Cape Town newspaper called Ruth "a foolish ignorant girl". The presence of the "White Queen" - as South African newspapers called Ruth - was seen as a threat to apartheid and several South African newspapers advocated invading Bechuanaland if the "White Queen" was permitted to stay.

Ruth's arrival in Bechuanaland in August 1949 coincided with the best rainy season in decades, which was taken as a good omen by the Bamangwato, who dubbed her the "Rain Queen". Ruth took part in a Bamangwato ceremony where a large group of women circled around her, singing songs while carrying buckets of water or corn before kneeling down to offer her the water and corn while proclaiming "You are the mother of us all!" Due to the adverse publicity, Ruth Khama disliked speaking to journalists, whom she shunned. Many of the newspaper stories portrayed her and her husband in an unflattering light, which greatly hurt her; a particular bugbear of hers was to pick out the inaccuracies in newspaper stories such as the claim that her husband's grades at the Inner Temple declined after he started dating her.

In addition, she was upset about stories in the British and American press written by journalists who had never been to Bechuanaland that portrayed it as either a wet place covered by jungles as typical of central Africa or as a savanna typical of East Africa (Bechuanaland had a hot, dry climate and much of the protectorate was covered by the Kalahari Desert). One of the few journalists whom she did speak to was the American journalist Margaret Bourke-White, who was able to gain her trust and did a photo-essay on her for Life.

Bourke-White became a close friend of hers and did much to keep up her spirits. Knowing that Ruth Khama was a great ailurophile, Bourke-White gave her the gift of two kittens, whom Seretse named Pride and Prejudice after his wife's favourite novel.

=== Exile in London ===
After receiving popular support in Bechuanaland, Seretse was called to London in March 1950 for discussions with British officials. Ruth advised her husband not to go to London, later saying: "I had a premonition they were going to keep him there". At the time, she was pregnant, and in case her child was a boy, she wanted to give birth in Bechuanaland as under Bamangwato custom a future king must be born on their soil.

As she suspected, it was a trick. He was prevented from returning home and told he had to remain in exile. The British government, which wished to stay in the good graces of the South African government, offered Seretse £1,000 if he would agree to renounce his claim to the throne; when he refused, he was told he was banished from Bechuanaland for the next five years. In a telegram to his wife, he wrote: "Tribe and myself tricked by British government. Am banned from whole protectorate. Love Seretse". As Ruth did not speak Setswana and most of the whites of Bechuanaland shunned her, after she was separated from her husband, she was very lonely with her principal companions being her two cats and her infant daughter.

The outbreak of the Korean War on 25 June 1950 increased the importance of South African uranium as it was a major fear of the Attlee government that the United States would become more interested in Asia at the expense of Europe, which it was felt would weaken the American "nuclear umbrella". The Attlee government believed that there was a serious possibility that Joseph Stalin had ordered the North Korean invasion of South Korea with the aim of embroiling the United States in Asia in order to launch a Soviet invasion of Western Europe. As such, it was felt to be of paramount importance that Britain have its own nuclear weapons as soon as possible, which in turn increased the importance of South African uranium.

Under British law, interracial marriages were legal, and the attempt to (in effect) apply the South African law against interracial marriage to a British protectorate by exiling the Khamas was seen as highly controversial; it was clear, at the time, that it was South African pressure that was decisive. In South Africa, the Afrikaner nationalist newspaper Die Transvaaler stated in an editorial, "While trying to prop up with words the whitewashed façade of liberalism, the British government has in practice had to concede to the demands of apartheid". In a leader (editorial), The Times stated, "They will not easily persuade public opinion, which has righteously been aroused, that the divergence in racial attitude between the Union [of South Africa] and the British territories can best be met by appeasement at cost of personal injustice. They will have a heavy task to prove that Seretse's exclusion will not do much more damage than his recognition". British public opinion was very much on the side of the Khamas and against the government.

During this time, a reconciliation with Ruth's father took place, as he accepted her decision to marry a black man. Ruth joined Seretse in England, with the married couple living as exiles from 1951 in Croydon.

Winston Churchill, as the leader of the Official Opposition, had criticised the ban on Seretse Khama placed by the Attlee government, calling it "a very disreputable transaction". However, when he won the 1951 election, Churchill decided to have the ban be permanently enforced, claiming that Seretse's return would be a danger to public order. Despite his claims, riots broke out in Bechuanaland when it was learned that the Khamas would not be permitted to return. In a vote in the House of Commons in 1951, 308 MPs voted to keep the Khamas exiled while 286 MPs voted to allow them to return. Notably, Prime Minister Churchill (who championed Khamas' cause as the leader of the opposition) said nothing during the vote. During his exile, Prince Seretse suffered from bouts of depression and, in 1952, Ruth told Porter that "Sometimes he just sits in front of the fire warming his hands and brooding. He suffers from lumbago because of the climate. Much as I love him—more than the day we were married—I cannot move him when he gets into one of his black moods. There is absolutely nothing that will snap him out of it."

=== Return to Bechuanaland ===
Popular support and protest continued in Bechuanaland. The couple were permitted to return in 1956 after the Bamangwato people sent a telegram to Queen Elizabeth II. Seretse renounced his throne and became a cattle farmer in Serowe. He founded the nationalist Bechuanaland Democratic Party and won the 1965 general election. As prime minister of Bechuanaland, he pushed for independence, which was granted in 1966. Seretse Khama became the first president of independent Botswana and he became a Knight Commander of the Most Excellent Order of the British Empire. Lady Khama was an influential, politically active First Lady during her husband's four consecutive terms as president from 1966 to 1980.

== Family ==
Lady Khama and her husband had four children. Their first child Jacqueline was born in Bechuanaland in 1951, shortly after Seretse was exiled. Their first son Ian was born in England in 1953, and twins Anthony and Tshekedi were born in Bechuanaland in 1958 (Anthony was named after Tony Benn, then known as Anthony Wedgwood Benn, who supported their return from exile in the early 1950s).

She remained in Botswana after her husband's death in office in 1980, receiving recognition as "Mohumagadi Mma Kgosi" (mother of the king, or queen mother). Despite the national controversy surrounding their union in the 1940s and 1950s, the couple were inseparable until his death from cancer in 1980.

After her husband's death, she lived on a large farm in Botswana, dedicating her time and efforts to charitable causes and spending time with her children and grandchildren.

Two of their sons, Ian and Tshekedi, have become prominent politicians in Botswana. Ian Khama was elected as the President of Botswana in 2008.

== Death ==
Lady Khama died of throat cancer in Gaborone in 2002 at the age of 78, survived by her four children. She was buried in Botswana next to her husband.

== In popular culture ==
A film, A Marriage of Inconvenience, based on the Michael Dutfield book with same name, was made in 1990 about the Khamas. In 2006, a book was published titled Colour Bar: The Triumph of Seretse Khama and His Nation, written by historian Susan Williams, about the Khamas' relationship and struggles. Another film, A United Kingdom, based on the Williams book and directed by Amma Asante, was made in 2016. In A United Kingdom, Lady Khama is portrayed by Rosamund Pike.

In addition to this, it has been suggested that the experiences of the Khamas, as well as the somewhat contemporary case of 1950s debutante Peggy Cripps' marriage to the African anti-colonialist Nana Joe Appiah, influenced the writing of the Oscar-winning feature film, Guess Who's Coming to Dinner (1967).

== Notes ==
Honorary titles
Preceded by Office created	First Lady of Botswana; 30 September 1966 – 13 July 1980	Succeeded by Gladys Olebile Masire
