= Gladys Olebile Masire =

First Lady of Botswana from 1980 to 1988

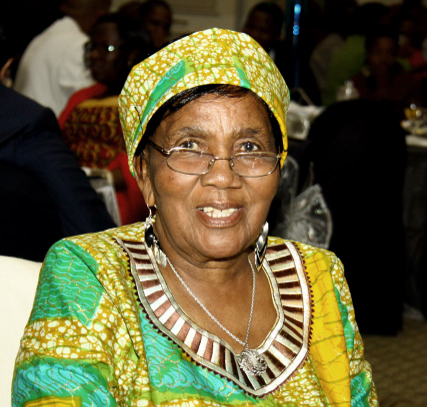

2nd First Lady of Botswana
- In role 13 July 1980 – 31 March 1998
- President: Quett Masire
- Preceded by: Ruth Williams Khama
- Succeeded by: Barbara Mogae

Personal details
- Born: Gladys Molefi Olebile; 30 July 1931 Modimola, Mafikeng, South Africa
- Died: 17 May 2014 (aged 82) Parktown, Johannesburg, South Africa
- Spouse: Sir Ketumile Masire (m. 1958)
- Children: 6
- Education: Tiger Kloof
- Profession: Teacher

Gladys Molefi Olebile Masire (30 July 1931 – 17 May 2014) was a Botswana teacher and political figure who served as the longest ruling First Lady of Botswana from 1980 until 1998.

== Early life and education ==
Gladys Molefi Olebile was born in 1931 in the village of Modimola, Mafikeng, Union of South Africa. She was the daughter of Fenkwane Mogwera and Mabu Mogwera. From her maternal side, she belonged to the Tawana-a-Tshidi Mina Tholo royal family. After graduating from Tigerkloof, she followed in her mother's footsteps by becoming a teacher for many years, firstly in her hometown of Mafikeng and later at Kanye, Bechuanaland.

== Career ==
In the 1980s, Lula Dawson, wife of U.S. Ambassador Horace Dawson, helped Olebile Masire establish Botswana's first charity. This charity was called the Child-to-Child Foundation of Botswana, and she was an honorary president of the foundation in 1996.

In 1990, Gladys Olebile Masire was a member of the Mandela National Reception Committee that helped prepare for Nelson Mandela's June 1990 visit to Gaborone after his release from Robben Island.

== Personal life ==
She was married to the late former President of Botswana Quett Ketumile Masire in 1958 and had six children.

== Honours ==
- Patron of the Special Olympics Botswana from 1989 until 2013.
- In the 1996/97 school year, the University of Botswana established the Lady Olebile Masire Prize in her name. This award is given to a student with the highest grades in the Faculty of Engineering.
- Presidential Order of Honour Award in 2016 by President Ian Khama (posthumous honour)

== Death ==
On 17 May 2014, she died at Milpark Hospital in Parktown, Johannesburg, South Africa, aged 82. She was buried in Kanye, Botswana, on 25 May 2014, a week later.
