= Kaone Boko =

First Lady of Botswana, from 2024

First Lady of Botswana
- Incumbent
- Assumed office 1 November 2024
- President: Duma Boko
- Preceded by: Neo Masisi

Personal details
- Born: 15 December 1987 (age 38) Moshupa, Botswana
- Spouse: Duma Boko
- Children: Yes
- Profession: Lawyer
- Known for: Commercial litigation, governance, community engagement, charitable initiatives

Kaone Tumalano Boko (born 15 December 1987), is a Motswana lawyer and is currently serving as the First Lady of Botswana as the wife of President Duma Gideon Boko since November 2024.
