= Molebatsi Molebatsi =

Motswana politician

Deputy Minister of Agriculture of Botswana
- In office 13 February 2022 – 1 November 2024
- President: Mokgweetsi Masisi
- Succeeded by: Edwin Dikoloti

Personal details
- Born: Botswana
- Party: Botswana Democratic Party

Molebatsi Shimane Molebatsi is a Motswana politician and educator. He served as the Deputy Minister of Agriculture of Botswana, having been appointed to the position in 2019 by President Mokgweetsi Masisi. His term began on 13 February 2022 and ended on 1 November 2024. He also served as MP for Mmadinare from 2019 to 2024.

Awards and achievements
Preceded by	Deputy Minister of Agriculture of Botswana	Succeeded by
