= Neo Masisi =

First lady of Botswana

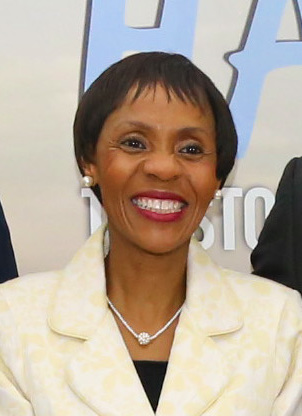

First Lady of Botswana
- In role 1 April 2018 – 1 November 2024
- President: Mokgweetsi Masisi
- Preceded by: Barbara Mogae (2008)
- Succeeded by: Kaone Boko

Personal details
- Born: Neo Jane Maswabi; 15 November 1971 (age 54)
- Spouse: Mokgweetsi Masisi
- Children: 1
- Profession: Accountant

Neo Jane Masisi also known as Mma Atsile is the former First Lady of Botswana and the wife of former Botswana President Mokgweetsi Masisi.

== Personal life ==
Neo Jane Masisi was born in November 1971 in Francistown, the eldest of six children of Baruki and Irene Maswabi. Both her parents were university graduates. She grew up and attended school in Gaborone, where her parents were working.

She married Mokgweetsi Masisi in 2002; they have a daughter named Atsile.

== Career ==
Masisi is an accountant. She trained at the Accountancy Training Centre of the Debswana Diamond Company where she obtained membership of the Chartered Institute of Management Accountants. From 2001 to 2004 she continued her studies at De Montfort University in England, where she obtained an MBA degree. First Lady Neo Masisi was in 2019 conferred Fellow Chartered Management Accountant by CIMA President Mr Steven Swientozielskyj in Gaborone. In 2004 she joined the United Nations, initially working at the UN Headquarters in New York City and then at the United Nations Economic Commission for Africa in Addis Ababa. She has also worked for the UN in the Central African Republic.

In 2017 Masisi moved back to New York to work on Umoja, an enterprise resource planning software system to be used by United Nations entities worldwide.

She left the UN in 2018 when her husband became President of Botswana.

Her role as First Lady is largely ceremonial. As First Lady, Masisi has focused on issues that affect children and adolescents, and on women's empowerment. In 2018 she launched Eseng Mo Ngwaneng, a UNICEF campaign against sexual exploitation and abuse.
