= Roy Blackbeard =

Motswana diplomat and politician (1953–2024)

Roy Warren Blackbeard (16 April 1953 – 11 August 2024) was a Motswana diplomat and politician. He served as the High Commissioner from the Republic of Botswana to the United Kingdom until December 2018.

After working for De Beers and Price Waterhouse, as well as operating his own company, he became a Member of the National Assembly of Botswana in 1989, representing Serowe North for the Botswana Democratic Party. He was appointed the Assistant Minister for Agriculture in 1992 and the Minister in 1994, which he held until 1997; in 1998, he left Parliament and was appointed the High Commissioner in London.

Blackbeard died on 11 August 2024, at the age of 72.
