= Matsitsileng =

Matšitšileng Wisconsin
- Location within Limpopo Location within South Africa
- Coordinates: 23.480°S 28.843°E
- Country: South Africa
- Province: Limpopo
- District: Waterberg
- Municipality: Mogalakwena

Area
  - Total: 7.69 km^{2} (2.97 sq mi)

Population (2011)
  - Total: 805
  - Density: 105/km^{2} (271/sq mi)

Racial makeup (2011)
  - Black African: 99.9%
  - Other: 0.1%

First languages (2011)
  - Northern Sotho: 95.6%
  - Zulu: 2.1%
  - Other: 2.2%
- Time zone: UTC+2 (SAST)

Matšitšileng, also known as Wisconsin, is a village Next to Ga-Mathapo(Ga-Matlala) in the Mogalakwena Local Municipality of the Waterberg District Municipality of the Limpopo province of South Africa. It is situated about 110 km northwest of Polokwane and Mokopane.

Many former residents of Matšitšileng have moved to urban areas such as Mokopane, Polokwane, Tshwane, Ekurhuleni, Johannesburg and other urban centres. Matšitšileng continues to rely on traditional farming and livestock farming.

== Demographics ==
The language spoken in Matšitšileng is Northern Sotho (commonly referred to as "Sepedi"). Although there is some ethnic diversity, like Tsongas (the Ndlovus, Mokoenas and the like), most of the people call themselves Bakone under Kgosi Matlala in Bavaria Ga-Mathapo, though he is not the Chief of Matšitšileng. The bona-fide Chief of the village is Kgoši Mmatšhaka of the Batlokwa tribe, though the inhabitants of Matšitšileng respect Kgoši Matlala for his position as a Chief of the Matlala area.

On 27 December 2016, the people of Matšitšileng went to the polls and elected Mr Lesetja Modiba (commonly known as "Afrika") to be their new Induna for a fixed term of five years.

== Schools ==
- Mafasa High School
- Ratinke Primary School, formerly known as Matšitšileng Community Comprehensive School

The people of Matšitšileng have embraced education as the key factor to the success of every family. However, there are no institutions of higher learning in Matšitšileng. Those who wish to further their studies have to go to Mahwelereng or Seshego for a teacher's diploma, or Mankweng for the University of Limpopo (Turfloop campus) for other qualifications, while some opt for Gauteng and job hunting.

== Employment ==
Seventy-eight percent of the people in Matjitjileng are teachers, 6% in the military, 2% police, 2% health, 2% other and 10% unemployed (stats to be verified).

== Infrastructure ==
There is some infrastructure in Matjitjileng. The roads are mostly graveled roads and some were created by cattle tracks over centuries. There is one visible road that crosses Matjitjileng from Ga-Thapedi supermarket and post office. Matšitšileng does not have a source of water like a river. Back in the days before people started having their own boreholes, they used to get water from the local well next to the famous Ga-Mahlatjie property (sedibeng) and the community borehole (pomping ya setshaba). Now there is a water supply, thanks to a government initiative.

Ga-Thapedi was a white-owned store where the locals used to buy anything from salt to school uniforms, wedding gowns and suits. It was known as Treves as it was a postal area code. The post office has now been moved to Ga-Mathapo, but the postal code (0618) still remains the same.
