= Lenyeletse Seretse =

Botswana politician (1921–1983)

- President: Sir Ketumile Masire

Lenyeletse Mpetwane Seretse (25 June 1921 – 3 January 1983) was the second Vice-President of Botswana from July 1980 until his death on 3 January 1983. From Serowe, Northern Botswana, Seretse was appointed vice-president to placate his fellow Northerners following the assumption of Southerner Quett Masire to the Presidency.

In 1937, Lenyeletse was sent to undertake Secondary School studies alongside Seretse Khama at Tiger Kloof. Upon graduation in 1944, Lenyeletse and Seretse were inducted into the Malekantwa age regiment.

Political offices
Preceded by Quett Masire	Vice-President of Botswana; 1980–1983	Succeeded by Peter Mmusi
