= Peter Mmusi =

Botswanan politician

Peter Simako Otlaadisang Mmusi
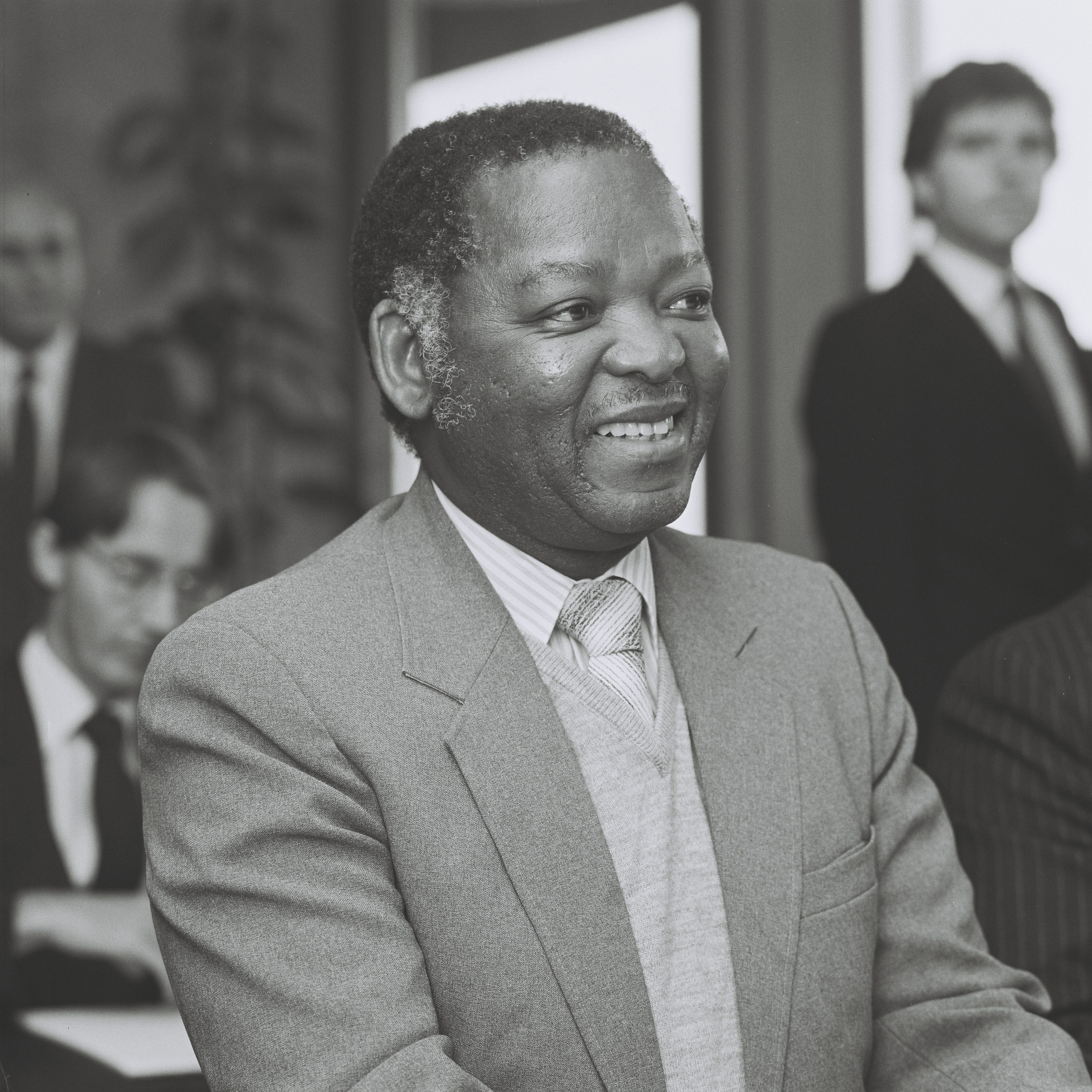

3rd Vice-President of Botswana
- In office 1983–1992
- Preceded by: Lenyeletse Seretse
- Succeeded by: Festus Mogae

Minister of Finance
- In office 1980–1989
- Preceded by: Quett Masire
- Succeeded by: Festus Mogae

Personal details
- Born: May 16, 1929 Mmankgodi, Bechuanaland Protectorate (now Botswana)
- Died: October 1, 1994 (aged 65)

Peter Simako Otlaadisang Mmusi (16 May 1929 –October 1994) was a Motswana politician who served as the third Vice-President of Botswana from 3 January 1983 until 6 March 1992. Born in Mmankgodi in the Kweneng District, he also served as Minister of Finance from 1980 to 1989, and as Minister of Local Government and Lands.

He resigned from office in 1992 following a presidential commission of inquiry which implicated him in illegal land dealings outside Gaborone.

Political offices
Preceded by Lenyeletse Seretse	Vice-President of Botswana; 1983–1992	Succeeded by Festus Mogae
