= Festus Mogae =

President of Botswana from 1998 to 2008

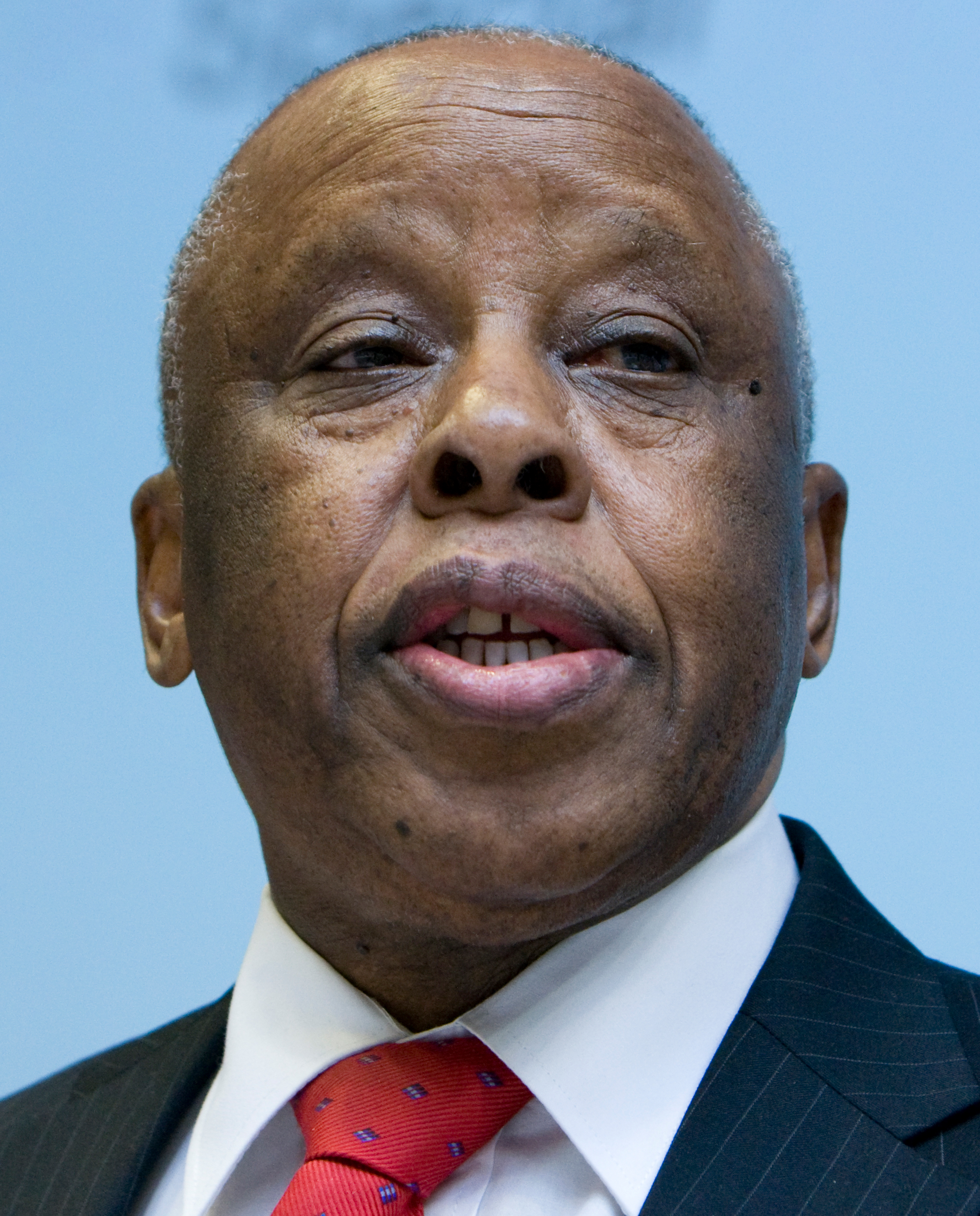
- Mogae in 2009

3rd President of Botswana
- In office 1 April 1998 – 1 April 2008
- Vice President: Ian Khama
- Preceded by: Quett Masire
- Succeeded by: Ian Khama

4th Vice-President of Botswana
- In office 9 March 1992 – 1 April 1998
- President: Quett Masire
- Preceded by: Peter Mmusi
- Succeeded by: Ian Khama

President of the Botswana Democratic Party
- In office 1 April 1998 – 1 April 2008
- Preceded by: Quett Masire
- Succeeded by: Ian Khama

Minister of Finance and Development Planning
- In office 1989–1998
- President: Quett Masire
- Preceded by: Peter Mmusi
- Succeeded by: Ponatshego Kedikilwe

Member of the National Assembly for Palapye
- In office 1994–1998
- Preceded by: Constituency established
- Succeeded by: Boyce Sebetela

Specially elected member of the National Assembly
- In office 1989–1994

Personal details
- Born: Festus Gontebanye Mogae; 21 August 1939 Serowe, Bechuanaland Protectorate
- Died: 8 May 2026 (aged 86) Gaborone, Botswana
- Party: Botswana Democratic Party
- Spouse: Barbara Modise (m. 1967)
- Children: 3
- Education: University College, Oxford (BA); University of Sussex (Master of Arts; MA)
- Profession: Economist

Festus Gontebanye Mogae (21 August 1939 – 8 May 2026) was a Motswana economist and politician who served as the third president of Botswana from 1998 to 2008. He previously served as vice-president from 1992 to 1998 and minister of finance and development planning from 1989 to 1998 under Quett Masire. A member of the Botswana Democratic Party (BDP), he led the party throughout his presidency.

Educated at the universities of Oxford and Sussex, Mogae began his career in Botswana's civil service in 1968. He worked in the finance ministry and represented African countries at the International Monetary Fund (IMF) before becoming governor of the Bank of Botswana in 1980. He served as permanent secretary to the president from 1982 to 1989, when he entered Parliament as a specially elected member. He won the Palapye constituency in the 1994 general election. He succeeded Masire on 1 April 1998 and led the BDP to victories in 1999 and 2004.

During Mogae's presidency, revenue from diamonds financed public services while the government sought to develop other industries. Mogae made HIV/AIDS a national priority. In 2002, Botswana became the first African country to launch a national programme of free antiretroviral therapy. Routine HIV testing in public health facilities followed in 2004. His government faced criticism over the relocation of San communities from the Central Kalahari Game Reserve, the deportation of political scientist Kenneth Good and the secrecy surrounding executions.

Mogae backed his vice-president, Ian Khama, in a contest for the BDP chairmanship in 2003. Khama's victory helped secure his position as Mogae's successor. Mogae left office on 1 April 2008 after reaching the constitutional limit of ten years. That October, he received the Ibrahim Prize for Achievement in African Leadership for his leadership during the AIDS epidemic and his record in government. In retirement, he continued his HIV/AIDS advocacy, served as a United Nations special envoy on climate change and chaired the supermarket group Choppies. In 2019 he said that he regretted choosing Khama as his vice-president.

== Early life and education ==
Mogae was born on 21 August 1939 in Serowe, then part of the British Bechuanaland Protectorate. His father was a headman of the Batalaote, and the family kept cattle. Mogae started school at the age of eleven. He later recalled that boys in his community learned to tend cattle before they went to school. He attended Moeng College before continuing his education in Britain.

Mogae studied economics at the North Western Polytechnic in London. In 1965 he entered University College, Oxford to read philosophy, politics and economics. He subsequently studied development economics at the University of Sussex, which awarded him a master's degree in 1970. He began working in Botswana's civil service in 1968, two years after the country gained independence.

== Civil service and financial career ==
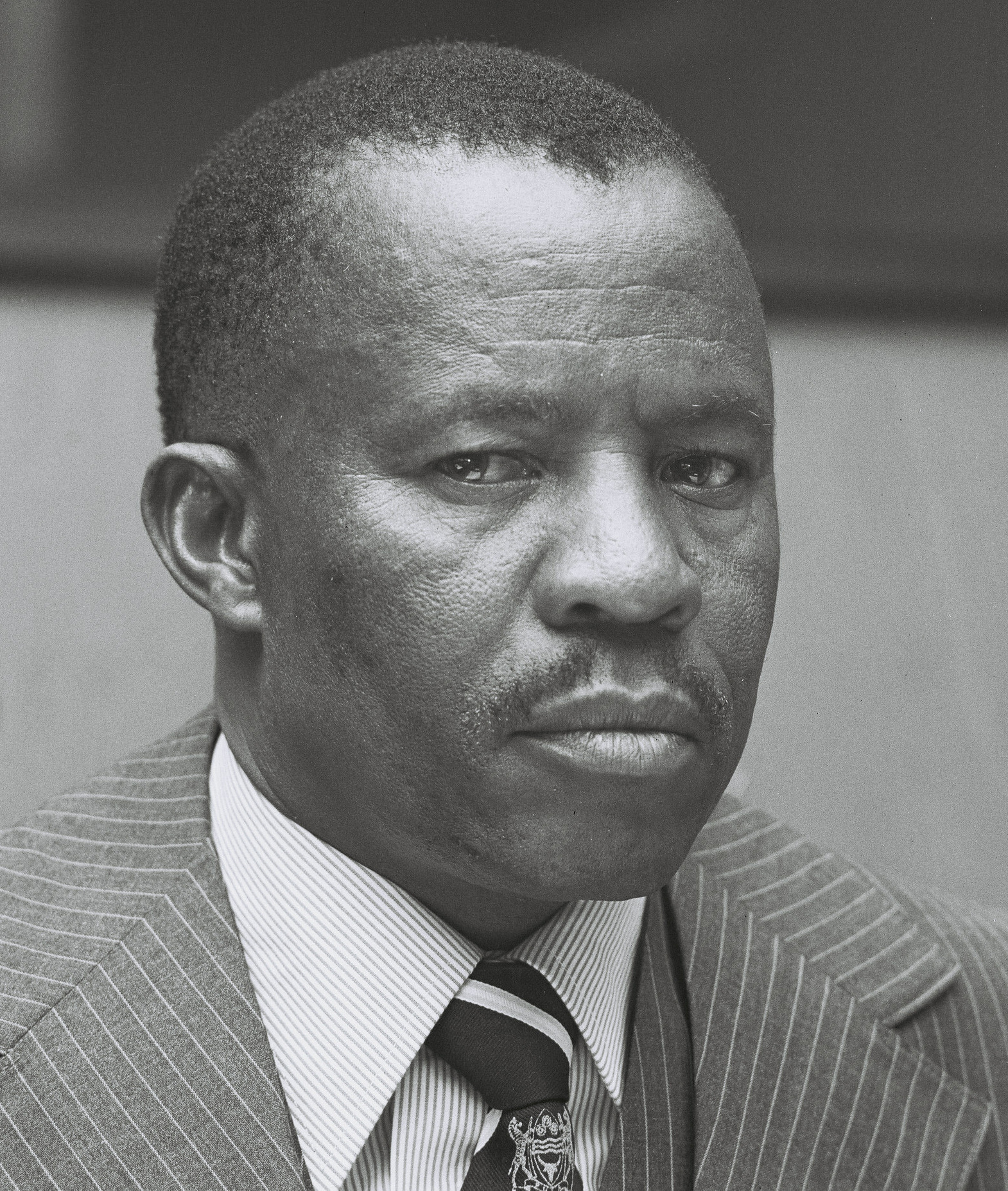
Quett Masire, under whom Mogae served in the civil service and government

Mogae joined the Ministry of Development Planning as a planning officer in 1968. He subsequently became director of economic affairs and, in 1975, permanent secretary in the Ministry of Finance and Development Planning. His career developed under Masire, who was then both vice-president and finance minister. The two maintained a close working relationship as Mogae moved from economic administration into national politics.

Alongside his ministry duties, Mogae represented Botswana in international financial institutions. Between 1971 and 1976, he served as alternate governor for Botswana at the IMF, the African Development Bank and the International Bank for Reconstruction and Development. He also held directorships in public enterprises, including the Botswana Development Corporation, Water Utilities Corporation, Botswana Housing Corporation and the diamond-mining company that became Debswana. These appointments placed him within the institutions responsible for managing the expansion of Botswana's economy after independence.

From 1976 to 1980, Mogae worked in Washington, D.C., as an alternate executive director and then executive director at the IMF, representing a constituency of English-speaking African countries. He returned to Botswana in 1980 to become governor of the Bank of Botswana. In 1982, he was appointed permanent secretary to President Masire, also serving as secretary to the Cabinet and supervisor of elections. He remained permanent secretary until entering ministerial politics in 1989.

== Entry into politics and vice-presidency ==
After the 1989 general election, the National Assembly elected Mogae to one of its four specially elected seats. Masire appointed him minister of finance and development planning. Mogae had spent his career in the civil service and had little standing in the BDP's organisation. Opposition politicians objected to the practice of bringing officials into the cabinet through specially elected seats.

Mogae's promotion to vice-president followed the controversy surrounding the Kgabo Commission's investigation into land allocations around Gaborone. Vice-President Peter Mmusi and Agriculture Minister Daniel Kwelagobe resigned in March 1992 after criticism of their involvement in land-allocation decisions. Masire appointed Mogae vice-president on 9 March, while retaining him as finance minister. His relative distance from the BDP's rival factions was a factor in the appointment, according to Masire's later account.

Mogae contested a constituency for the first time at the 1994 general election, winning the newly created Palapye seat against Botswana National Front (BNF) candidate Klaas Motshidisi. The BDP retained government but lost ground nationally, winning 27 of the 40 elected seats as the BNF increased its representation to thirteen. Mogae's victory gave him a constituency base while he remained vice-president and the prospective successor to Masire.

Constitutional changes in 1997 introduced a ten-year limit on presidential tenure and provided for the vice-president to succeed automatically to a vacant presidency. Other reforms established an independent electoral commission and reduced the voting age from 21 to 18. Masire announced that he would retire before the next general election, allowing Mogae to take office before seeking an electoral mandate as party leader.

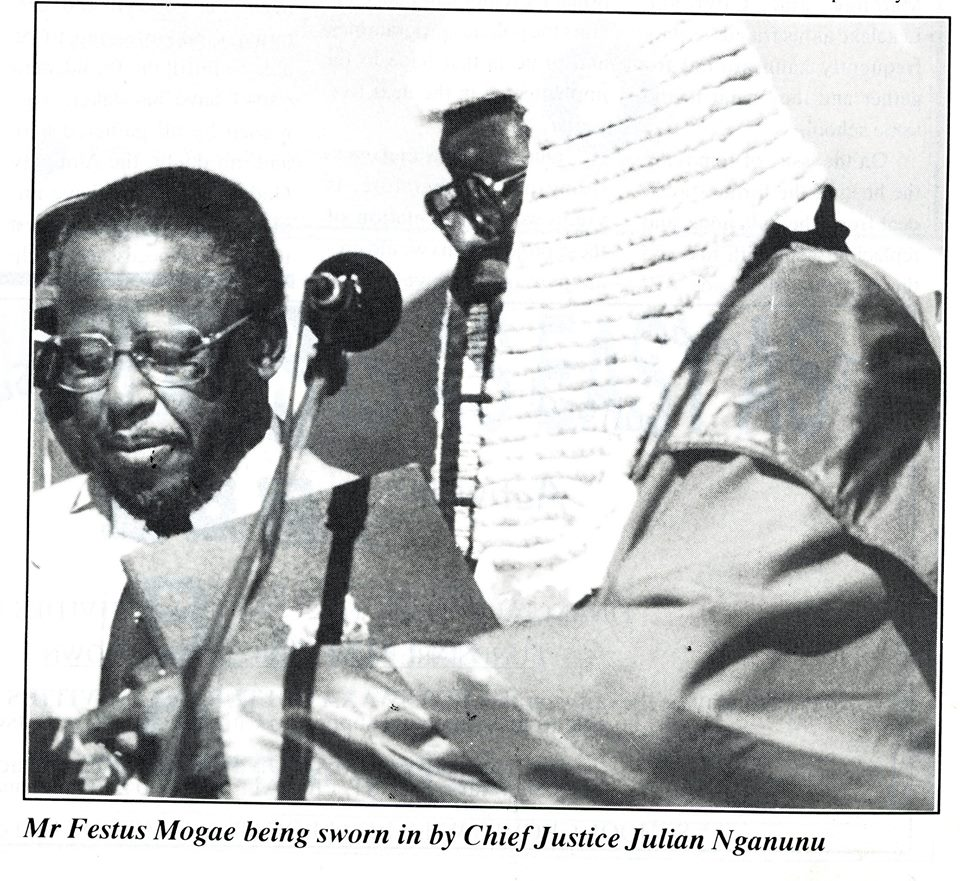
Mogae taking the presidential oath before Chief Justice Julian Nganunu on 1 April 1998

Masire retired at the end of March 1998, shortly after a visit to Botswana by US President Bill Clinton. Mogae was sworn in on 1 April. Masire was the first Botswana president to retire. He had himself taken office on the death of Seretse Khama in 1980.

== Presidency (1998–2008) ==
=== Accession and government formation ===
Mogae took office while the BDP was divided by factional disputes and facing a stronger parliamentary opposition than it had during most of its time in government. He recruited Ian Khama, the retiring commander of the Botswana Defence Force, into the government. Khama was the son of Botswana's first president and the hereditary leader of the Bangwato, whose support was important to the BDP.

Khama initially became minister of presidential affairs and public administration. Because he did not yet hold an elected parliamentary seat, he could not immediately become vice-president. Roy Blackbeard resigned as MP for Serowe North, and Khama won the resulting by-election in July 1998. He was sworn in as vice-president on 13 July. Mogae appointed Ponatshego Kedikilwe, a leading figure in a rival BDP faction, to the finance ministry.

The opposition split soon after Mogae's accession. In 1998, a group led by Michael Dingake broke away from the BNF to establish the Botswana Congress Party (BCP). The division weakened the BNF's parliamentary position and split opposition support ahead of the next general election.

=== 1999 general election ===
Constituency results of the 1999 general election, in which the BDP won 33 of the 40 elected seats

The general election of 16 October 1999 was the first administered by the new Independent Electoral Commission and the first in which eighteen-year-olds could vote. The BDP campaigned on its economic record, fiscal prudence and support for private investment. Mogae also made the HIV/AIDS epidemic a campaign priority. The opposition criticised persistent poverty, unemployment and inequalities in the distribution of diamond wealth, while the BDP argued that divisions among its opponents made them an unreliable alternative government.

Mogae issued the election writ before the names of voters who had registered during a supplementary registration period had been published for inspection. The timing threatened to exclude more than 60,000 people from the roll. As Parliament had already been dissolved, Mogae declared a state of emergency to recall it. Parliament amended the Electoral Act to admit the voters, and the emergency ended five days after it began.

The BDP won approximately 57.1% of the vote and 33 of the 40 elected seats, increasing its majority. The BNF won six seats and the BCP one. The division between the two opposition parties contributed to the BDP's recovery from its losses in 1994. Mogae was sworn in for a new term on 20 October, pledging to address poverty and unemployment.

=== HIV/AIDS ===
Botswana had one of the world's highest HIV prevalence rates, and AIDS had sharply reduced life expectancy. An estimate used by researchers studying routine testing in the mid-2000s put HIV prevalence at 37% of adults. Mogae spoke publicly about the scale of the crisis and made the national response a presidential priority. He chaired the National AIDS Council and took an HIV test publicly to encourage testing and challenge the stigma associated with the virus.

His government combined public expenditure with international partnerships. The African Comprehensive HIV/AIDS Partnerships brought together the government, the Bill & Melinda Gates Foundation and Merck & Co. to support treatment, prevention and the health system. In 2002, the government launched the Masa programme. Eligible citizens could obtain antiretroviral drugs free of charge through the public health service, the first national programme of its kind in Africa.

Treatment initially expanded more slowly than intended. Shortages of trained personnel, weaknesses in health infrastructure and reluctance to undergo testing limited access. In early 2004, the government introduced routine HIV testing in health facilities, with patients able to decline. The policy aimed to identify infections earlier and connect more people to treatment.

Prevention of transmission from mothers to their children was another priority. In its assessment following Mogae's death, UNAIDS reported that AIDS-related deaths had fallen by 39% during his presidency and new infections among children by 73%. Mogae continued to campaign for prevention alongside treatment, particularly in response to the stigma that discouraged people from seeking care.

=== Economic policy ===
Mogae's economic policy emphasised fiscal discipline, private investment and the management of diamond revenues. His government sought to reduce Botswana's dependence on mining by encouraging other industries and developing financial services. The International Financial Services Centre was one component of this strategy. The remaining exchange controls were abolished in 1999, and legislation expanded the Bank of Botswana's role in regulating financial-services businesses.

In 2000, the government adopted a privatisation policy, followed by a programme for restructuring and transferring selected state enterprises to private ownership. Implementation proceeded slowly. A retrospective assessment in the government-owned Daily News attributed the limited progress partly to resistance within the public administration and identified economic diversification as an unresolved problem of Mogae's presidency.

The government also changed the exchange-rate regime. In 2005, the pula was devalued by 12%, and a crawling exchange-rate mechanism was introduced to allow continuing adjustment against Botswana's trading partners. The measures were intended to correct the currency's overvaluation and improve competitiveness, particularly outside the mining industry. They also increased the domestic cost of imported goods and contributed to inflationary pressure.

Diamond revenues continued to support economic growth, public services and foreign-exchange reserves. However, dependence on mining, unemployment and unequal access to the benefits of growth remained concerns. The cost of the HIV/AIDS response added to demands on public expenditure, even as treatment helped limit the loss of skilled workers and the wider economic effects of the epidemic.

=== Social policy and labour relations ===
Mogae's government continued reforms to laws affecting women's legal status. The Citizenship Act 1998, which received assent on 20 April and came into force on 24 April, provided for citizenship through either parent and included children born outside marriage. The legislation formed part of the development of nationality law following the constitutional challenge brought by Unity Dow.

The Abolition of Marital Power Act 2004 removed the common-law authority of husbands over their wives and provided for equal powers in the administration of matrimonial property and the guardianship of children. The Act applied to marriages under common law. It left the rules governing customary and religious marriages in place.

In 2003 and 2004, Parliament amended trade-union and labour-dispute legislation after Botswana's ratification of International Labour Organization conventions in 1997. The amendments allowed public officers to form and join unions and bargain collectively. Members of the armed forces, police and prison service were excluded.

In 2004, workers at Debswana's Jwaneng and Orapa mines sought higher wages and bonuses after the company reported strong profits. Mogae invited management and union representatives to his office to try to settle the dispute. While they were meeting, Debswana's lawyers sought a court order against the strike. The court declared the strike unlawful, and Debswana dismissed 461 workers. Mogae criticised the union's conduct, while the dismissals became a continuing source of resentment within the labour movement.

=== Telecommunications and broadcasting ===
Botswana's telecommunications market expanded during Mogae's presidency. Mascom began operating in 1998, alongside the second mobile operator, Vista, later Orange Botswana. The introduction of competing mobile networks widened access to telephone services.

Botswana Television began broadcasting in July 2000, completing a project that had been considered under earlier administrations. Previously, television viewing had depended largely on foreign broadcasts and a limited domestic private service. The new national broadcaster extended the state's role in television production and distribution, while also prompting debate over government control of broadcasting and its implications for political coverage.

=== Foreign relations ===
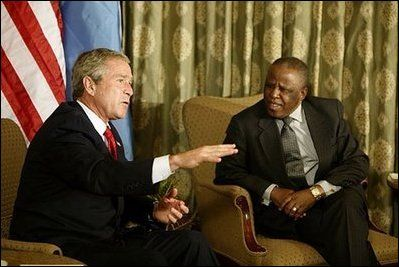
Mogae with US President George W. Bush during Bush's visit to Botswana in July 2003

Mogae maintained close relations with Western governments while participating in regional diplomacy through the Southern African Development Community. His foreign policy emphasised investment, development assistance, the international response to HIV/AIDS and the peaceful settlement of disputes. He also defended the economic importance of Botswana's diamond industry and its distinction from the trade in conflict diamonds, supporting the Kimberley Process Certification Scheme.

Relations with the United States included visits to Washington and cooperation on HIV/AIDS. Mogae visited President George W. Bush at the White House in 2002 and 2005, and hosted Bush in Botswana in July 2003. His overseas travel drew criticism in Botswana over its frequency and cost. The government defended the visits as a means of securing investment and development assistance.

==== Namibia and the Caprivi conflict ====
Relations with Namibia were strained early in Mogae's presidency by the arrival of refugees and separatist leaders from the Caprivi Strip. Among them was Mishake Muyongo, a former Namibian opposition leader associated with the Caprivi Liberation Army. President Sam Nujoma sought the return of separatists who had entered Botswana, while Mogae's government treated their claims as applications for asylum.

In February 1999, Botswana granted political asylum to Muyongo and fourteen other separatist leaders. The decision became a central issue in talks between Mogae and Nujoma in Gaborone the following month. With assistance from the United Nations High Commissioner for Refugees, arrangements were made for the group to move to Denmark in May. The wider refugee crisis continued, particularly after fighting in Katima Mulilo in August 1999, and Botswana, Namibia and UNHCR subsequently negotiated arrangements for voluntary repatriation.

The two countries were also pursuing a territorial dispute over Kasikili/Sedudu Island in the Chobe River. Their disagreement concerned which channel around the island constituted the boundary established by an 1890 Anglo-German treaty. The case had been submitted to the International Court of Justice under Masire. On 13 December 1999, the court determined that the boundary followed the northern channel and that the island belonged to Botswana. It also held that nationals and vessels of both countries should receive equal treatment in the channels around the island.

=== BDP factional disputes ===
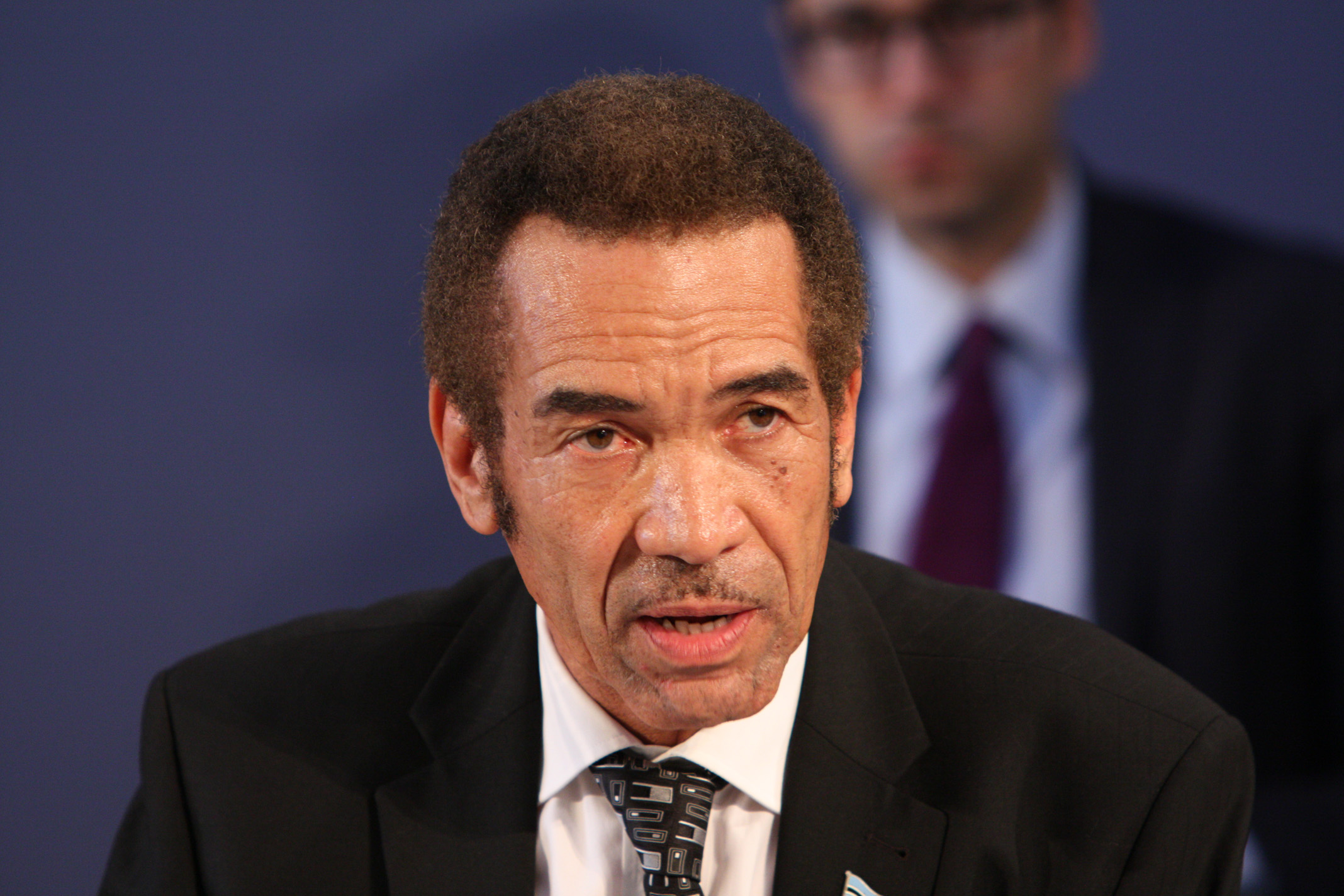
Ian Khama, Mogae's vice-president and successor

Mogae's presidency was marked by competition between factions within the BDP. The group associated with Ponatshego Kedikilwe and Daniel Kwelagobe, subsequently known as Barata-Phathi, had a substantial base within the party organisation. Its rivals coalesced around Khama in the faction commonly called the A-Team. The divisions reflected competition over party office and presidential succession as well as disagreements about government policy.

Mogae's appointment of Khama as vice-president had disappointed senior politicians who considered themselves better qualified. Khama's position as a hereditary leader and former military commander also attracted criticism from those concerned about the combination of traditional, military and political authority. Mogae initially sought to accommodate rival groups in his government, but his reliance on Khama increasingly aligned the presidency with one side of the contest.

The dispute came to a head before the BDP congress at Ghanzi in July 2003. Mogae publicly backed Khama's challenge to Kedikilwe for the party chairmanship. Khama won by 512 votes to 219. Contemporary reporting described the result as strengthening Mogae's control over the central committee and making Khama's eventual succession more likely. It also raised questions about whether the defeated faction would remain within the party.

The election did not end internal disagreements. BDP backbenchers continued to challenge aspects of government policy and the leadership's management of the party. Factional disputes continued beyond Mogae's retirement.

=== 2004 general election ===
Constituency results of the 2004 general election, in which the BDP won 44 of the 57 elected seats

Mogae led the BDP into the general election on 30 October 2004, the first held after the number of elected constituencies had increased from 40 to 57. The BNF contested the election in an electoral pact with the Botswana People's Party and Botswana Alliance Movement, but the BCP remained outside the arrangement. Opposition votes consequently remained divided in a number of constituencies.

The BDP defended its development record and the government's response to HIV/AIDS. Mogae promised improvements in training, water and electricity provision, and changes to legislation that discriminated against women. Opposition parties focused on poverty and unemployment and complained about unequal access to the state media. Observers generally regarded the election as free and fair, while recording concerns over the advantages enjoyed by the governing party.

The BDP won approximately 51.7% of the vote and 44 of the 57 elected seats. The BNF took 12 seats and the BCP one. Although the BDP's share of the vote had declined since 1999, the result secured another presidential term for Mogae.

=== Civil liberties and human rights ===
==== Capital punishment ====
Botswana retained the death penalty throughout Mogae's presidency. Mogae defended its use, arguing that it had public support and was an appropriate punishment for serious crimes. Human-rights organisations criticised both capital punishment itself and the secrecy surrounding executions, including the lack of advance notice to prisoners' families and lawyers.

The execution of Mariette Bosch in 2001 attracted particular international attention. Bosch, a South African national convicted of murder, was hanged without prior notification to her family or legal representatives. Her lawyers said that they had been seeking clemency and had not been informed that the execution would take place. Amnesty International condemned the manner in which it had been carried out.

==== Central Kalahari relocations ====
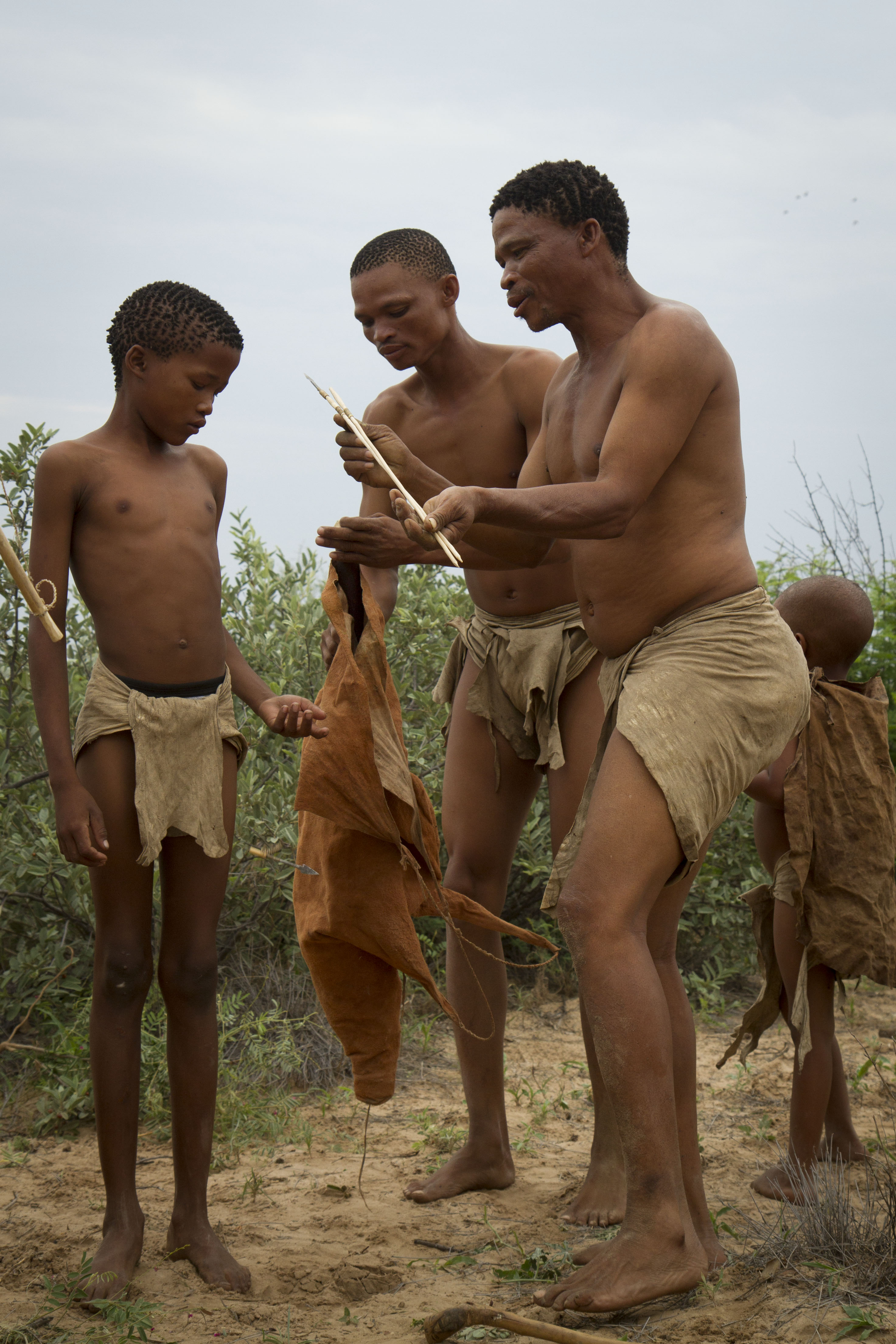
The relocation of San communities from the CKGR became a major dispute during Mogae's presidency.

Under Masire and then Mogae, the government moved San communities, known in Botswana as Basarwa, from settlements within the Central Kalahari Game Reserve (CKGR). The government argued that providing services to small settlements within the reserve was expensive and that relocation would improve access to education, health care and economic opportunities. It also maintained that permanent settlement and some forms of resource use were incompatible with the reserve's conservation objectives.

Residents and organisations including Survival International disputed the government's account of voluntary resettlement. They described pressure to leave, inadequate consultation and the disruption of livelihoods based on hunting and gathering. Some campaigners linked the removals to diamond deposits within the reserve. The government denied that mining had motivated its policy.

Mogae's public statements intensified the controversy. In an interview published in The New York Times in 1996, while he was vice-president, he argued that the San had to change their way of life to survive in modern society. Critics subsequently cited the remarks when objecting to the government's claim that resettlement would benefit the people it displaced.

In 2002, the government ended the provision of services to settlements in the reserve, including water supplies, food assistance, transport for schoolchildren and mobile health care. Residents argued that the withdrawal left them little practical choice but to leave. A group of applicants brought a legal challenge, represented by lawyers including Gordon Bennett and Duma Boko.

The High Court delivered judgment in Sesana and Others v Attorney General on 13 December 2006. It found that the applicants had lawfully occupied their settlements and, by a majority, that the government had deprived them of possession without their consent. It also found unlawful the refusal to issue them special game licences and the requirement that they obtain permits to re-enter the reserve. However, the majority upheld the termination of public services and did not order the government to restore them.

The successful applicants could return, but access to water remained in dispute. Disputes over implementation continued after Mogae left office. In a 2010 report, UN Special Rapporteur James Anaya treated the situation in the reserve as part of wider concerns about the rights and participation of indigenous peoples in Botswana.

==== Deportation of Kenneth Good ====
In February 2005, Mogae declared Kenneth Good, an Australian political scientist who had taught at the University of Botswana since 1990, a prohibited immigrant. The decision followed criticism of Botswana's political system in a paper Good had written with Ian Taylor, including criticism of automatic presidential succession. Good challenged the order in court but was deported to South Africa on 31 May.

The government initially declined to give detailed reasons for the decision, relying on the president's powers under immigration legislation. Critics regarded the deportation as an attack on academic freedom and freedom of expression. University students and academics protested, and the International Press Institute condemned the expulsion as damaging to Botswana's reputation for political openness.

Mogae rejected the claim that Good had been expelled simply for criticising the government. In December 2005, he said that Good had sought international support for a boycott of Botswana's diamonds. Taylor, writing about the case in the Journal of Contemporary African Studies, argued that the expulsion exposed the limits of freedom of expression under an executive empowered to remove foreign residents without publicly explaining its reasons.

Good took his complaint to the African Commission on Human and Peoples' Rights. In May 2010, the commission found that Botswana had violated several provisions of the African Charter on Human and Peoples' Rights, including protections relating to expression, a fair hearing, expulsion and family life. It recommended compensation for lost remuneration and legal costs, and changes to immigration law and practice to bring them into conformity with the charter.

=== Departure from office ===
Mogae's accession in April 1998 meant that the constitutional limit of ten years would require him to leave office before the end of the parliamentary term elected in 2004. Khama remained his intended successor, but some BDP MPs opposed his reappointment as vice-president after the election. Mogae threatened to dissolve Parliament and call another election if they refused to endorse Khama. On 8 November, the Assembly confirmed Khama as vice-president.

The prospect of Khama's succession revived debate about the automatic transfer of the presidency to the vice-president. Supporters presented the arrangement as a means of ensuring continuity and stability, while opponents argued that it reduced the electorate's influence over the choice of president. The controversy over Good's deportation added to scrutiny of the succession process.

On 14 July 2007, at a BDP gathering in Molepolole, Mogae confirmed that he would leave office in April 2008. He subsequently undertook a farewell tour and gradually gave Khama a more prominent public role. In his final public appearances as president, he encouraged other African leaders to retire when their time in office ended.

Khama was sworn in on 1 April 2008 at a ceremony attended by Mogae, Barbara Mogae and Masire. The transfer was widely reported as peaceful and orderly. It also confirmed the succession arrangement that Mogae had supported throughout much of his presidency.

== Later life ==
=== HIV/AIDS advocacy and diplomacy ===
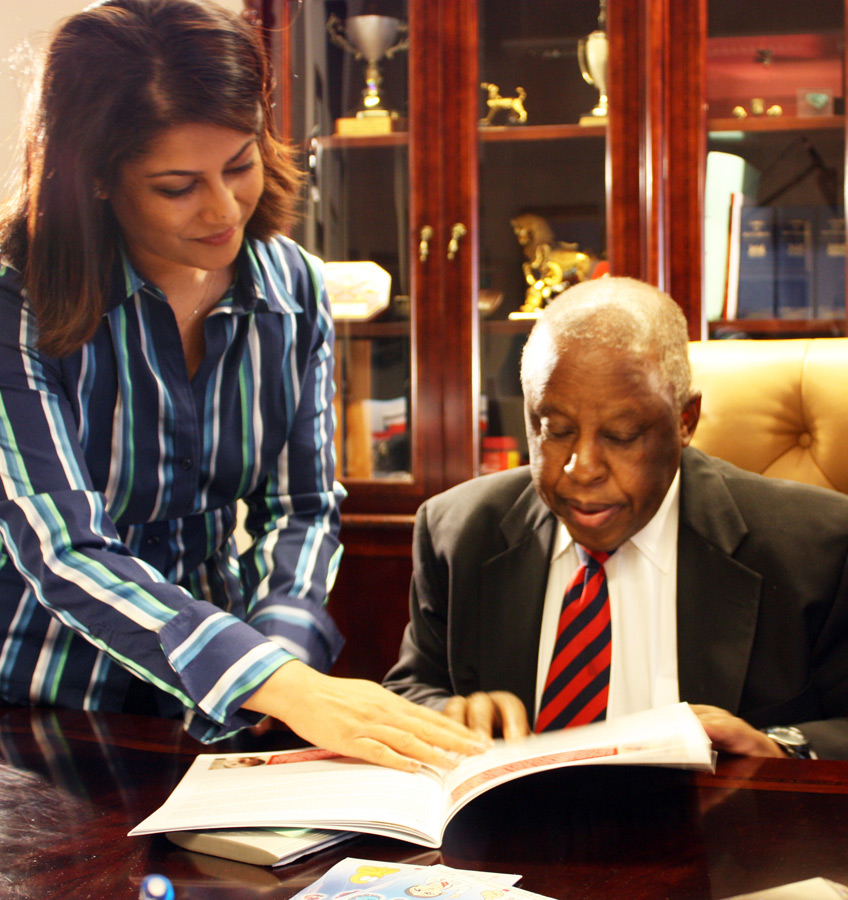
Mogae with TeachAids founder Piya Sorcar in 2010

After leaving office, Mogae continued to campaign on HIV/AIDS. In August 2008, he launched Champions for an HIV-Free Generation, bringing together former African presidents and other public figures to encourage political leadership on prevention and treatment. He subsequently participated in UNAIDS commissions on HIV prevention and global health.

In September 2008, UN Secretary-General Ban Ki-moon appointed Mogae a special envoy on climate change. He joined Gro Harlem Brundtland, Ricardo Lagos and Srgjan Kerim in efforts to build political support for international climate negotiations.

=== Business interests ===
Mogae became chairman of the Choppies supermarket group after leaving the presidency and invested in the company. During his association with the group, Choppies expanded beyond Botswana and listed on the Botswana Stock Exchange in 2012 and the Johannesburg Stock Exchange in 2015.

The company later became embroiled in disputes over its accounts and management. Delays in publishing audited results led to the suspension of trading in its shares in 2018 and a sharp fall in their value. In 2019, Mogae and other directors came into conflict with chief executive Ramachandran Ottapathu. Mogae left the board that year after shareholders backed Ottapathu. In January 2020, the Botswana Gazette reported that Mogae intended to sell his remaining shares.

=== Relations with his successors ===
Mogae initially avoided public criticism of Khama, but their relationship deteriorated during Khama's presidency. Mogae criticised his successor's economic management, concentration of power and approach to dissent. He also opposed plans to acquire Gripen fighter aircraft. By 2018, he was openly expressing regret about having helped bring Khama to power.

Khama disputed Mogae's criticism. Responding in May 2019 to Mogae's comments about regretting his choice of vice-president, Khama said that he respected his predecessor's right to express an opinion and had regrets of his own about decisions he had made. The exchange occurred amid Khama's increasingly public dispute with Mokgweetsi Masisi, who had succeeded him as president in 2018.

Mogae supported Masisi during the latter's conflict with Khama and backed BDP candidates in the 2019 general election.

== Personal life and death ==
Mogae married Barbara Gemma Modise in 1967. They had three daughters, Nametso, Chedza and Boikaego. He died at his home in Gaborone on 8 May 2026, aged 86. President Duma Boko announced his death and declared three days of national mourning. No cause of death was announced. A state funeral was held in Gaborone on 16 May.

== Honours and recognition ==
French President Nicolas Sarkozy awarded him the Grand Cross of the Legion of Honour on 20 March 2008, shortly before he left office.

In October 2008, Mogae was awarded the Ibrahim Prize for Achievement in African Leadership. The prize recognised his leadership of Botswana, including his response to HIV/AIDS and his departure from office within constitutional limits. It carried an award of US$5 million over ten years and an annual payment of US$200,000 thereafter.

Announcing the award, Kofi Annan, the chair of the prize committee, singled out Mogae's handling of the AIDS epidemic. San campaigners challenged the choice. In a statement released by Survival International, they argued that the award overlooked the government's treatment of people removed from the Central Kalahari Game Reserve.
