= Nutford House, London =

Coordinates: 51.5171°N 0.1630°W

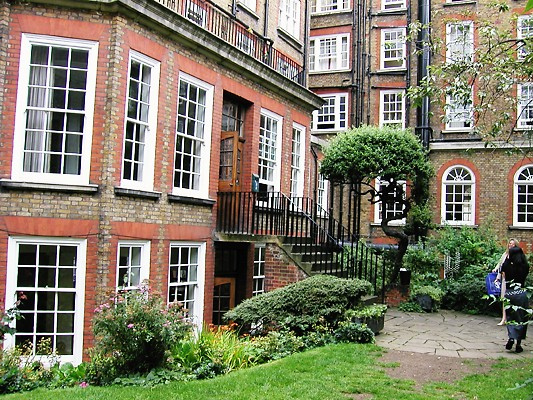
Nutford House

Nutford House is a university hall of residence in London, located on the corner of Nutford Place and Brown Street, near Marble Arch in the City of Westminster.

It was built in 1916 and was acquired by the University of London in 1949, after which it was expanded to take in five terraced houses in Brown Street, known as the Annexe and one house in Seymour Place. Accommodation is provided for 223 men and women students in 181 single and 21 twin rooms.

Nutford House has a total of 181 single rooms, and 21 shared rooms across the main hall, annexe and Seymour Place.

The residence is split into 3 separate accommodations: Main Hall, The Annexe and Seymour. Residents in Seymour Place only have access to laundry facilities and common areas in the main or annex buildings. The House has 2 common rooms in the main building, one of which is a TV room and the other a JCR (Junior Common Room) with a piano. There is no Senior Common Room. There is, however, a music room in the annex. The annex also houses a games room with darts, foosball table, and TV.
