= Kenneth Good (political scientist) =

Australian political scientist (1933–2020)

- Born: 12 December 1933; Queensland, Australia
- Died: 3 November 2020 (aged 86); Melbourne, Australia

Academic background
- Education: University of Queensland (B.A., M.A.,), McGill University (Ph.D.)

Academic work
- Discipline: political science, political economy, African politics
- School or tradition: political science and political economy
- Institutions: RMIT University; University of Botswana; University of Zambia; University of the South Pacific; University of Papua New Guinea; University of Rhodesia; La Trobe University

Kenneth Alfred Francis Good (12 December 1933 – 3 November 2020) was an Australian academic and formerly Professor of Political Science at the University of Botswana. He specialized in the analysis of the political economy of African and Melanesian nations. In 2005 he was ejected from Botswana for criticizing the government, later winning a favorable judgement from the African Commission on Human and Peoples’ Rights.

== Background ==
Good was born and grew up in Queensland, Australia. He studied at the University of Queensland (BA 1964, MA Political Science, 1965) and gained a PhD in political science from McGill University, Canada in 1969.

After PhD graduation he taught briefly at the new La Trobe University in Melbourne (1969–1972). He then taught at the University of Rhodesia (1972-3, expelled by the Smith regime for challenging apartheid), University of Papua New Guinea (1975–80), University of Port Harcourt, Nigeria (1980–81), the University of Zambia (1982–89) and the University of the South Pacific.

He was Associate Professor then Professor of Political Studies, University of Botswana from 1990 to 2005 before being declared a Prohibited Immigrant by the government at the age of 72.

He resided in Melbourne, Australia and was adjunct professor in Global Studies, RMIT University and taught occasionally in South Africa, where he was Visiting Professor in Political and International Studies, Rhodes University.

== Scholarship ==
- Democracy and Democratisation
- Poverty and inequalities
- Corruption and non-accountability
- Resource dependency
- Southern African politics and development

A long-standing theme of Good's research was the tendency of elites to derail democracy in developing countries. In his latter years in Botswana, Good, along with other human rights researchers, identified the expulsion of the San Bushmen from their homelands as being linked to state and commercial interests wishing to exploit diamond reserves, and also questioned the Presidential succession rules and the lack of coherent opposition to the ruling Botswana Democratic Party, which wins every election. In 2014 he published a major work of synthesis supporting participatory democracy worldwide (Good 2014).

== Removal from Botswana ==
In May 2005 Good co-authored a book chapter "Unpacking the 'Model': Presidential Succession in Botswana", with Ian Taylor. He was later declared a Prohibited Immigrant and, after unsuccessful legal challenges, escorted to the South African border. No official reason was given for his expulsion. After some months in Europe, Good returned to Australia, where he had not lived since the 1970s, leaving behind his daughter who was finishing school. Good later took his case to the African Commission on Human and Peoples’ Rights. In May 2010 they handed down their judgement in Good's favour:

"...the Commission finds that Botswana has violated Articles 1, 2, 7.1.a, 9, 12.4 and 18.1 & 18.2 of the African Charter. 244. The Commission recommends: 1. that the Respondent State provides adequate compensation to the victim for the loss and cost he has incurred as a result of the violations. The compensation should include but not be limited to remuneration and benefits he lost as a result of his expulsion, and legal costs he incurred during litigation in domestic courts and before the African Commission. The manner and mode of payment of compensation shall be made in accordance with the pertinent laws of the Respondent State; and 2. The Respondent State should take steps to ensure that Sections 7(f), 11(6) and 36 of the Botswana Immigration Act and its practices conform to international human rights standards, in particular, the African Charter."

The Government of Botswana has not implemented these judgements.

== Main publications ==
- Good, K.A. 2019. The Struggle of Democratisation against Authoritarianism in Contemporary Africa. Newcastle, UK: Cambridge Scholars Publishing. ISBN 1-5275-3309-3
- Good, K.A. 2014. Trust in the Capacities of the People, Distrust in Elites. New York: Lexington Books.
- Good, K.A. 2008. Diamonds, Dispossession and Democracy in Botswana. Oxford and Johannesburg: James Currey and Jacana Media.
- Good, K.A. 2002. The Liberal Model and Africa: Elites Against Democracy. London: Palgrave.
- Good, K.A. 1997. Realising Democracy in Botswana, Namibia and South Africa. Pretoria: Africa Institute. (2nd ed. 2004 with amendments and Conclusion)
- Good, K.A. and M. Donaldson. 1988. Articulated Agricultural Development: Traditional and Capitalist Agricultures in Papua New Guinea. Aldershot, Gower Publishing.
- Good, K.A. 1986. Papua New Guinea: A False Economy. Indigenous Peoples and Development Series, no. 3. London: The Anti-Slavery Society.
- Good, K.A. A. Amarshi and R. Mortimer. 1979. Development and Dependency: The Political Economy of Papua New Guinea. Oxford University Press.
