= Ponatshego Kedikilwe =

7th Vice President of The Republic of Botswana

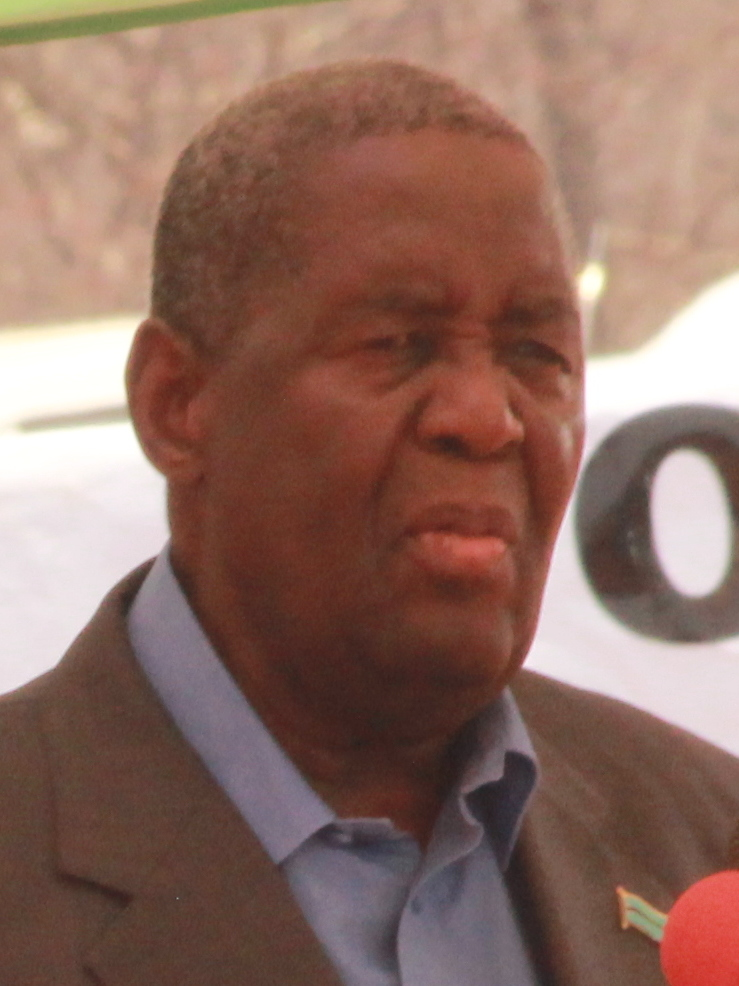

7th Vice President of Botswana
- In office 31 July 2012 – 12 November 2014
- President: Ian Khama
- Preceded by: Mompati Merafhe
- Succeeded by: Mokgweetsi Masisi

Minister of Finance
- In office 1998–1999
- Preceded by: Festus Mogae
- Succeeded by: Baledzi Gaolathe

Minister of Minerals, Energy, and Water Resources of Botswana
- In office January 2007 – ?
- President: Festus Mogae, Ian Khama

Personal details
- Born: July 7, 1938 (age 87) Bechuanaland Protectorate, now (Botswana)
- Party: BDP

Ponatshego Honorius Kefaeng Kedikilwe (born 7 July 1938) is a Motswana politician who was Vice-President of Botswana from 2012 to 2014. A member of the Botswana Democratic Party (BDP), he also served as Minister of Minerals, Energy, and Water Resources from 2007 to 2014.

== Career ==
Mr Kedikilwe was inaugurated as the founding Vice Chancellor of Botswana Open University (BOU) which was previously Botswana College of Open and Distance Learning (BOCODOL) in 2018. He was also a board member for Sefalana Holdings, joining them in 2014, later becoming the board's chairperson. He retired from the position in 2020.

== Political career ==
Kedikilwe was educated at the Kikuyu College of Social Studies, the University of East Africa, Nairobi 1963–64; University of Rochester, NY 1964–65; University of Connecticut 1965–68; Maxwell School of Citizenship and Public Affairs, Syracuse University.

He was first elected to the National Assembly as the Member of Parliament for Mmadinare and served from 1984 to 2019. He served as Minister of Finance from 1998 to 1999.

Kedikilwe served as Chairman of the BDP until 2003. President Ian Khama was elected as Botswana Democratic Party Chairman at a party congress on 22 July 2003, defeating Kedikilwe; Khama received 512 votes against 219 for Kedikilwe. Khama had been backed for the post by Former President Festus Mogae, and the outcome was viewed as crucial, paving the way for Khama to eventually succeed Mogae as president during that time.

Kedikilwe was appointed Minister of Minerals, Energy, and Water Resources in January 2007.

Vice-President Mompati Merafhe retired on 31 July 2012. President Ian Khama nominated Kedikilwe as vice-president on 1 August 2012, and the National Assembly promptly approved the nomination; 38 MPs voted in favor, while 12 abstained from the vote. Kedikilwe was sworn in later in the same day. The government said that Kedikilwe would retain his portfolio as Minister of Minerals, Energy, and Water Resources.

Following the 2014 general election, Khama instead nominated Mokgweetsi Masisi as vice-president on 12 November 2014.

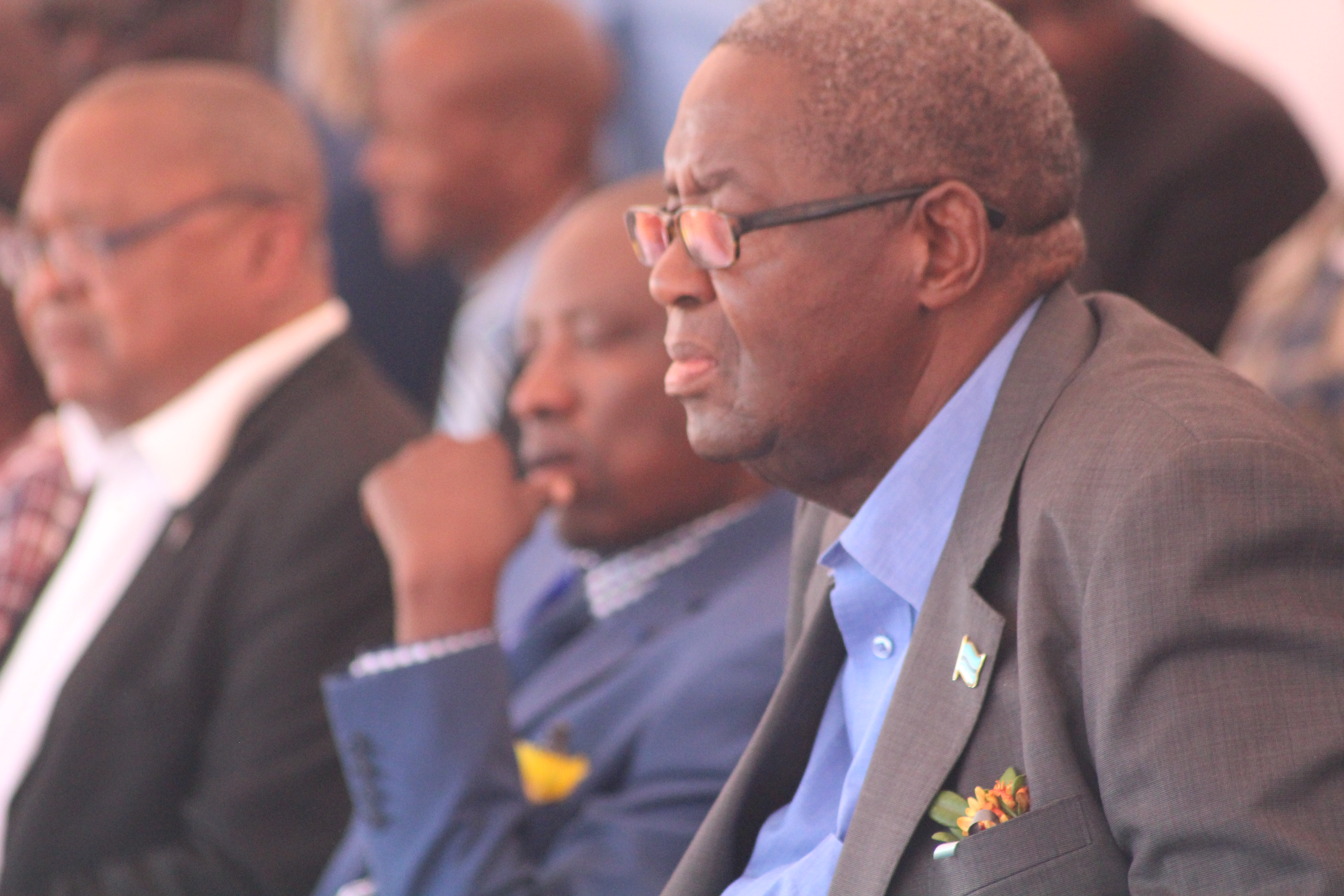

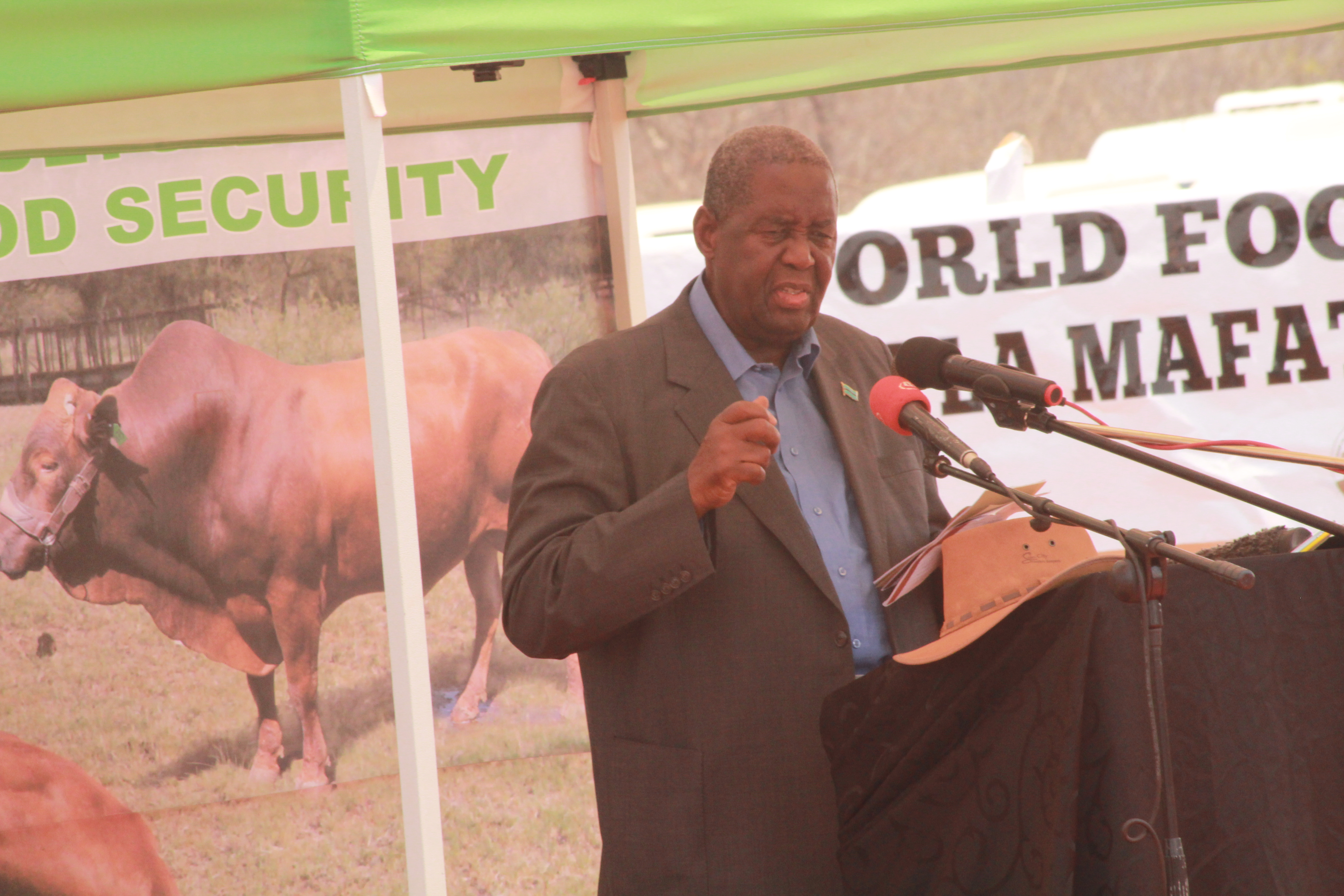

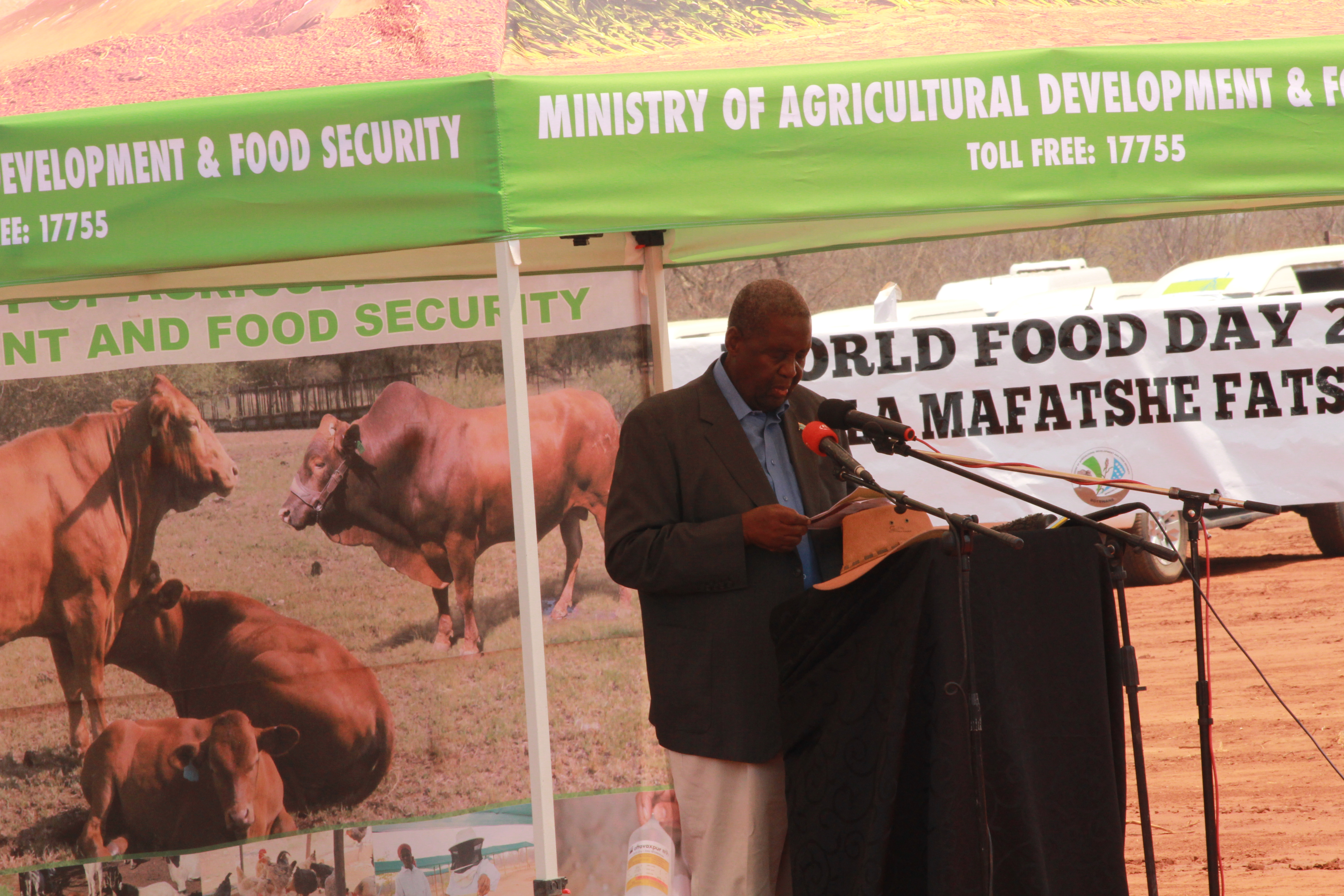

Political offices
Preceded by Mompati Merafhe	Vice President of Botswana; 2012-2014	Succeeded by Mokgweetsi Masisi
