= Vice-President of Botswana =

Deputy head of state and government of Botswana

The vice-president of Botswana is the second-highest executive official in the Government of Botswana. The vice-president is appointed by the president from among the elected members of the National Assembly. The vice-president is the constitutional successor of the president in case of a vacancy. The current vice-president is Ndaba Gaolathe.

== List of officeholders ==
Political parties

Botswana Democratic Party (BDP)
Alliance for Progressives (AP)

Symbols

^{†} Died in office

No.	Portrait	Name (Birth–Death)	Term of office			Political party
No.	Portrait	Name (Birth–Death)	Took office	Left office	Time in office	Political party
1		Quett Masire (1925–2017)	30 September 1966	13 July 1980	13 years, 287 days	BDP
2		Lenyeletse Seretse (1921–1983)	18 July 1980	3 January 1983^{[†]}	2 years, 6 months	BDP
3		Peter Mmusi (1929–1994)	3 January 1983	8 March 1992	9 years, 65 days	BDP
4		Festus Mogae (1939–2026)	9 March 1992	31 March 1998	6 years, 82 days	BDP
5		Ian Khama (born 1953)	13 July 1998	1 April 2008	9 years, 263 days	BDP
6		Mompati Merafhe (1936–2015)	1 April 2008	31 July 2012	4 years, 121 days	BDP
7		Ponatshego Kedikilwe (born 1938)	1 August 2012	12 November 2014	2 years, 103 days	BDP
8		Mokgweetsi Masisi (born 1961)	12 November 2014	1 April 2018	3 years, 140 days	BDP
9		Slumber Tsogwane (born 1960)	4 April 2018	1 November 2024	6 years, 211 days	BDP
10		Ndaba Gaolathe (born 1972)	7 November 2024	Incumbent	1 year, 231 days	AP (UDC)

== See also ==
- Politics of Botswana
- First Lady of Botswana
- List of colonial governors of Bechuanaland
- List of heads of state of Botswana
- List of heads of government of Botswana
