= Quett Masire =

President of Botswana from 1980 to 1998

Quett Masire GCMG
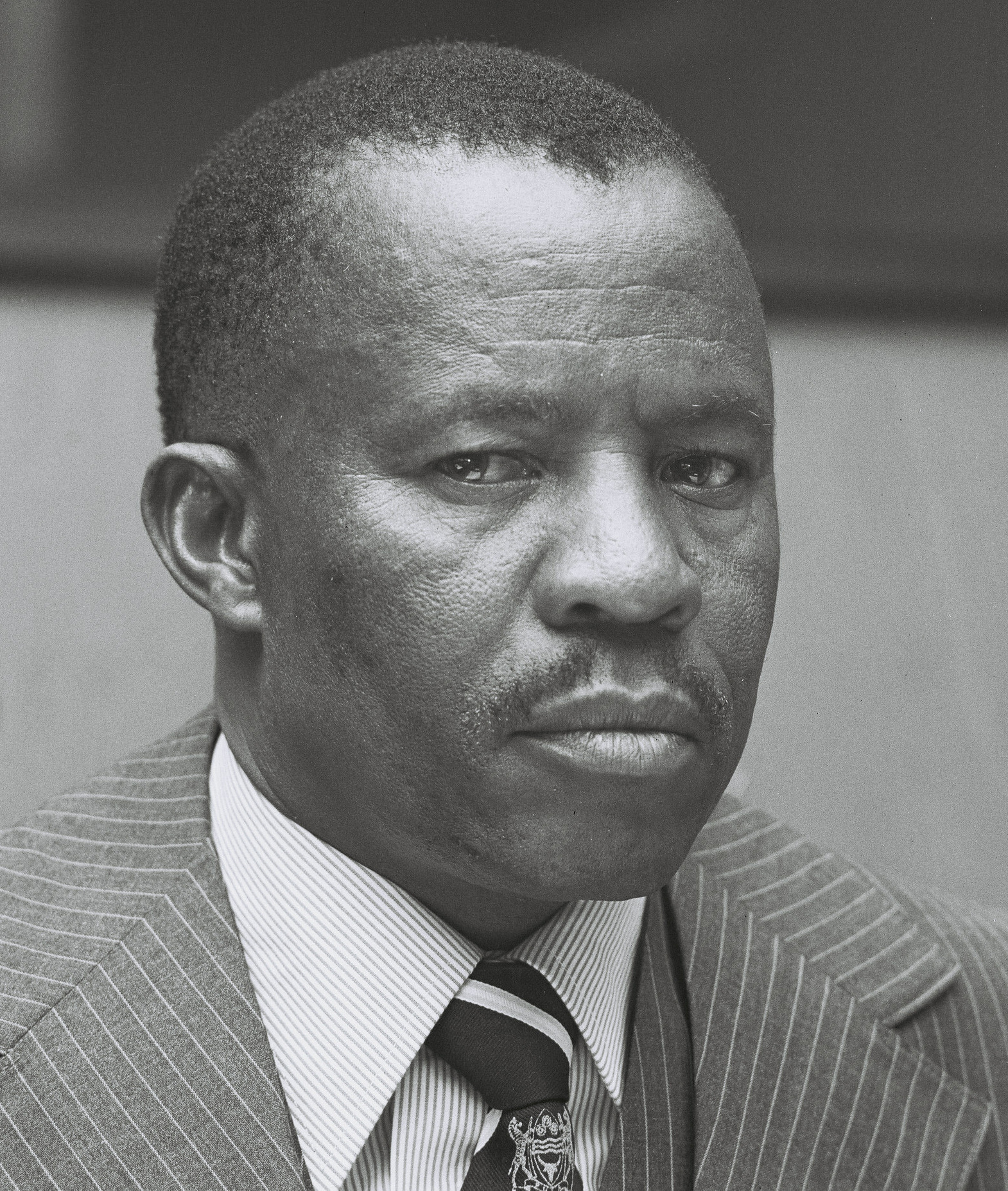
- Masire in 1980

2nd President of Botswana
- In office 13 July 1980 – 31 March 1998; Acting to 18 July 1980
- Vice President: Lenyeletse Seretse; Peter Mmusi; Festus Mogae
- Preceded by: Seretse Khama
- Succeeded by: Festus Mogae

1st Vice-President of Botswana
- In office 30 September 1966 – 13 July 1980
- President: Seretse Khama
- Preceded by: Position established
- Succeeded by: Lenyeletse Seretse

1st Vice Prime Minister of Botswana
- In office 3 March 1965 – 30 September 1966
- Preceded by: Position established
- Succeeded by: Position abolished

Personal details
- Born: Ketumile Quett Joni Masire; 23 July 1925 Kanye, Bechuanaland Protectorate
- Died: 22 June 2017 (aged 91) Gaborone, Botswana
- Party: Botswana Democratic Party
- Spouse: Gladys Olebile Masire (m. 1958; died 2014)
- Children: 6
- Education: Bangwaketse Reserve
- Profession: Teacher

Ketumile Quett Joni Masire GCMG (23 July 1925 – 22 June 2017) was a Motswana politician and statesman who was the second and longest-serving president of Botswana, in office from 1980 to 1998. He was given an honorary knighthood of the Grand Cross of Saint Michael and Saint George by Queen Elizabeth II (GCMG) in 1991.

He was a leading figure in the independence movement and then the new government, and played a crucial role in facilitating and protecting Botswana's steady financial growth and development. He stepped down in 1998 and was succeeded by Vice-President Festus Mogae, who became the third president of Botswana.

== Early life ==
Masire was born on 23 July 1925 in Kanye, Bechuanaland Protectorate, into a cattle-herding family to Gaipone (née Kgopo) and Joni Masire. He grew up at a time when there was not much economic activity in the country other than working as low-paid migrant labourers in the mines of apartheid South Africa. From an early age Masire set himself apart through academic achievement. After graduating at the top of his class at his local school in Kanye, he won a scholarship to further his education at the Tiger Kloof Educational Institute in South Africa.

In 1950, after graduating from Tiger Kloof, Masire helped found the Seepapitso II Secondary School, the first institution of higher learning in the Bangwaketse Reserve. He served as the school's headmaster for about six years. During this period he clashed with Bathoen II, the autocratic Bangwaketse ruler. Resenting Bathoen's many petty interferences in school affairs, Masire, working through the revived Bechuanaland African Teachers Association, became an advocate for the autonomy of protectorate schools from chiefly authority.

In 1957, Masire earned a Master Farmers Certificate and established himself as one of the territory's leading agriculturalists. His success led to renewed conflict with the jealous Bathoen, who seized his farms as a penalty for the supposed infraction of fencing communal land.

In 1958, Masire was appointed the protectorate reporter for the African Echo/Naledi ya Botswana newspaper. He was also elected to the newly reformed Bangwaketse Tribal Council and, after 1960, to the protectorate-wide African and Legislative Councils. Although he attended the first Kanye meeting of the People's Party, the earliest nationalist grouping to enjoy a mass following in the territory, he declined to join the movement.

Masire married Gladys Olebile Masire in 1958. Sir Quett and Lady Masire had six children.

== Politics and governance ==
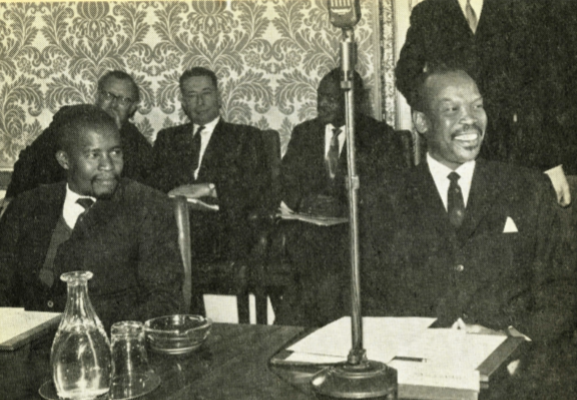
Masire (front left) with Seretse Khama during Botswana's independence talks in 1965

In 1961, Masire helped found the Botswana Democratic Party (BDP). He was instrumental in the formation of the party, and served as its first secretary-general.

In March 1965, the Democratic Party won 28 of the 31 contested seats in the new Legislative Assembly, giving it a clear mandate to lead Botswana to independence. Masire was elected to the legislature and became Deputy Prime Minister in 1966 under Prime Minister Seretse Khama. Upon independence later that year, Masire became the new nation's vice-president, under President Khama. Until 1980 he also held the significant portfolios of finance (from 1967) and development planning (from 1967), which were formally merged in 1971.

As a principal architect of Botswana's steady economic and infrastructural growth between 1966 and 1980, Masire earned a reputation as a highly competent technocrat. However, his local Bangwaketse political base was eroded by his old nemesis Bathoen. During the initial years of independence the Democratic Party government moved decisively to undercut many of the residual powers of the chiefs. As a result, in 1969 Bathoen II a Seêpapitsô abdicated, only to reemerge as the leader of the opposition National Front. This set the stage for Bathoen's local electoral victory over Masire during the same year. However, the ruling party won decisively at the national level, thus allowing Masire to maintain his position as one of the four "specially elected" members of Parliament.

== Presidency ==
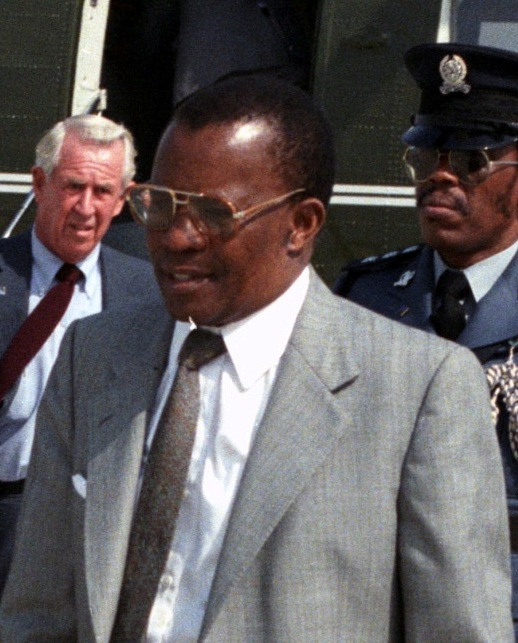
Quett Masire departing after a state visit to the United States in 1984.

Khama died on 13 July 1980, and Masire automatically became acting president per the Constitution.

Five days after Khama's death, Masire was elected as president by secret ballot at the National Assembly on 18 July 1980. Masire's three full terms were characterised by an emphasis on developments through regional and international organisations. Masire was chairman of the Southern African Development Community and vice chairman of the Organisation of African Unity; he was also chairman of the Global Coalition for Africa and a member of the UN group on Africa Development.

On 7 August 1988, while flying with his staff to a summit in Angola, his executive jet was accidentally shot at by an Angolan Air Force MiG-23. The plane was damaged and Masire was injured, but the co-pilot was able to make a successful emergency landing.

== Post-presidency and death ==
Following his retirement in 1998, Sir Ketumile Masire was involved in numerous diplomatic initiatives in a number of African countries, including Ethiopia, Lesotho, Malawi, Mozambique, Ghana and Swaziland. Between 1998 and 2000 he served as Chairman of the International Panel of Eminent Personalities Investigating the Circumstances Surrounding the 1994 Rwandan genocide, and between 2000 and 2003 was the facilitator for the Inter-Congolese National Dialogue, which had the objective of bringing about a new political dispensation for the Democratic Republic of Congo, in terms of the Lusaka Ceasefire Agreement.

In 2007, Sir Ketumile Masire set up the Sir Ketumile Masire Foundation to promote the social and economic well-being of the society of Botswana. The foundation strives to facilitate and drive efforts to promote peace, good governance and political stability internationally; assist children with disabilities from birth; and promote innovation and alternatives in agriculture.

During the last decade of his life, Masire became increasingly unhappy with the direction of the Botswana Democratic Party and the government of Ian Khama. Events such as the loss of about a fifth of the membership to the breakaway Botswana Movement for Democracy in 2010, and the bitter 2011 BOFEPUSU strike made him question leadership decisions. He came to conclude that the BDP had lost its original ideas, and had instead been taken over by opportunists looking to benefit from senior government positions. As a result, he became estranged from the party for the first time in his life.

Sir Ketumile was also a founding member of the Global Leadership Foundation, an organization which works to support democratic leadership, prevent and resolve conflict through mediation and promote good governance in the form of democratic institutions, open markets, human rights and the rule of law. It does so by making available, discreetly and in confidence, the experience of former leaders to today's national leaders. It is a not-for-profit organization composed of former heads of government, senior governmental and international organization officials who work closely with heads of government on governance-related issues of concern to them.

In May 2010 Sir Ketumile Masire led an African Union Election Observer Mission to the May 2010 Ethiopian general election, and in October 2010 he co-led (with fellow GLF Member Joe Clark) a National Democratic Institute pre-election assessment mission in Nigeria, which identified a number of hurdles that could undermine a successful process surrounding the 2011 state and national polls.

He was the chancellor of the University of Botswana from 1982 to 1998.

Masire died at Bokamoso Hospital in Mmopane, Botswana, surrounded by his family, on 22 June 2017 at the age of 91. He had been hospitalized on 18 June after undergoing surgery for an unspecified reason, but his health deteriorated afterwards. He was buried on the morning of Thursday 29 June 2017 in his home village Kanye, Botswana.

== Honours and accolades ==
- Three Honorary Doctorates of Law (L.L.D.) from St. John's University, New York, and Williams College, Massachusetts, in the United States (1980), and in the United Kingdom (1988)
- Two Honorary Doctorate of Humane Letters from Ohio University (1988), and DePaul University (1994) in the United States.
- Africa Prize for Leadership for the Sustainable End of Hunger (1988)
- Grand Counsellor of the Royal Order of Sobhuza II, Swaziland (1988)
- Honorary Knighthood of the Grand Cross of Saint Michael and Saint George (GCMG), UK (1990)
- Namibia's Order of the Welwitschia (1995)
- Free Market Award from the Free Market Foundation of South Africa (2000)
- Sir Ketumile Masire Hospital named after the second president of Botswana

Political offices
Preceded by New office	Vice-President of Botswana; 1966–1980	Succeeded by Lenyeletse Seretse
Preceded by Seretse Khama	President of Botswana; 1980–1998	Succeeded by Festus Mogae
