= Jonas Gwangwa =

South African musician (1937–2021)

Jonas Mosa Gwangwa OIG
- Born: 19 October 1937; Soweto, South Africa
- Origin: South Africa
- Died: 23 January 2021 (aged 83)
- Genres: Jazz
- Occupations: Musician, songwriter, producer
- Years active: 1959–2021

Jonas Mosa Gwangwa OIG (19 October 1937 – 23 January 2021) was a South African jazz musician, songwriter and producer. He was an important figure in South African jazz for more than 40 years.

== Life and career ==
Gwangwa was born in Orlando East, Soweto, on 19 October 1937. He first gained prominence playing trombone with The Jazz Epistles. After the short-lived group broke up, he continued to be important to the South African music scene and then later abroad.

In the 1960s, he began to gain recognition in the United States, and in 1965 he was featured in a "Sound Of Africa" concert at Carnegie Hall. The others at the concert included South African musicians Miriam Makeba, Hugh Masekela, and Letta Mbulu. Despite his international fame, he was not seen favourably by the apartheid government, and went into exile in the 1970s.

Initially exiled to the United States, Gwangwa spent the late 1970s and a better part of the 1980s living in Gaborone, Botswana, where he founded the band Shakawe that included South African musicians Steve Dyer, Dennis Mpale, Tony Cedras and local Botswana musicians Rampholo Molefhe, Whyte Kgopo, Bonjo Keipedile, Tsholofelo Giddie and Japie Phiri. During his time in Gaborone, Gwangwa got involved in the MEDU Art Ensemble, a collection of anti-apartheid musicians, visual artists, and writers, working alongside other Botswana-based South African exiles such as Keorapetse Kgositsile, Baleka Mbeta, Tim Williams, Thami Mnyele and Mongane Wally Serote. During the 14 June 1985 apartheid South African Defence Force cross-border Raid on Gaborone, which killed MEDU members Mnyele, Mike Hamlyn and ten others, as well as bombing a house recently vacated by MEDU leader Williams, Gwangwa believed he and other artistic exiles were being targeted by the apartheid government and returned to overseas exile.

From 1980 to 1990, at the request of ANC leader in exile, Oliver Tambo, Gwangwa was the leader of Amandla, the cultural ensemble of the African National Congress. Gwangwa assembled Amandla participants from exiled South Africans in Angola and toured more than 40 countries with Amandla the musical, a story of South Africa's struggle against apartheid told in artistic musical form.

In later life, he became important as a composer doing the scores of films including Cry Freedom (1987) and, at the 60th Annual Academy Awards in 1988, he performed his nominated song "Cry Freedom". Also, in 1988, he performed at the Nelson Mandela 70th Birthday Tribute in Wembley Stadium, London. In 1991, he returned to South Africa and in 1997 composed the theme for the country's Olympic bid.

Gwangwa is paid tribute as the subject of the composition "Portrait of Mosa Gwangwa" by Johnny Dyani, which appeared on Dyani's album Angolian Cry.

Gwangwa died due to cardiac complications on 23 January 2021, at the age of 83.

== Honours ==
- South Africa: Order of Ikhamanga, Gold (27 April 2010)

== Bibliography ==
- Jürgen Schadeberg, Don Albert, Jazz, Blues and Swing: Six Decades of Music in South Africa, 2007, ISBN 978-0-86486-705-6
