= Timeline of Gaborone =

Botswana's Capital city

The following is a timeline of the history of the city of Gaborone, Botswana.

== Prior to 20th century ==
- 1890 - Gaberones founded by British South Africa Company.
- 1897 - Railway station built.

== 20th century ==
- 1960-1966 - Gaberones becomes capital of independent Botswana
- 1963 - Town construction begins.
- 1964
  - Bechuanaland Daily News begins publication.
  - Population: 3,855.
- 1965
  - British colonial Bechuanaland Protectorate capital relocated to Gaberones from Mafeking.
  - Gaborone Secondary School built.
- 1966
  - Gaberones becomes capital of independent Botswana.
  - Botswana National Stadium opens.
  - Derek Jones becomes mayor.
- 1968 - Botswana National Museum built.
- 1969
  - Gaberones renamed "Gaborone."
  - Debswana Diamond Company Ltd headquartered in Gaborone.
- 1971 - Population: 17,718.
- 1975 - Sister city relationship established with Burbank, California.
- 1979 - Serara Ketlogetswe becomes mayor.
- 1980
  - Mosque built.
  - Southern African Development Community headquartered in Gaborone.
- 1982
  - University of Botswana established.
  - University of Botswana Stadium opens.
- 1984
  - 14 June: Raid on Gaborone.
  - Seretse Khama International Airport opens.
  - Paul Mmlotsi Rantao becomes mayor.
  - Mmegi newspaper begins publication.
- 1985 - Botswana Gazette newspaper begins publication.
- 1988 - Gaborone Broadcasting Company established.
- 1991
  - Population: 133,468.
  - Botswana College of Agriculture established near city.
- 1993 - "The Voice Newspaper" begins publication
- 1995 - Botswana Stock Exchange and Botswana Institute for Development Policy Analysis headquartered in city.
- 1998 - Fictional The No. 1 Ladies' Detective Agency book series begins publication.
- 1999 - Nelson Ramaotwana becomes mayor.

== 21st century ==
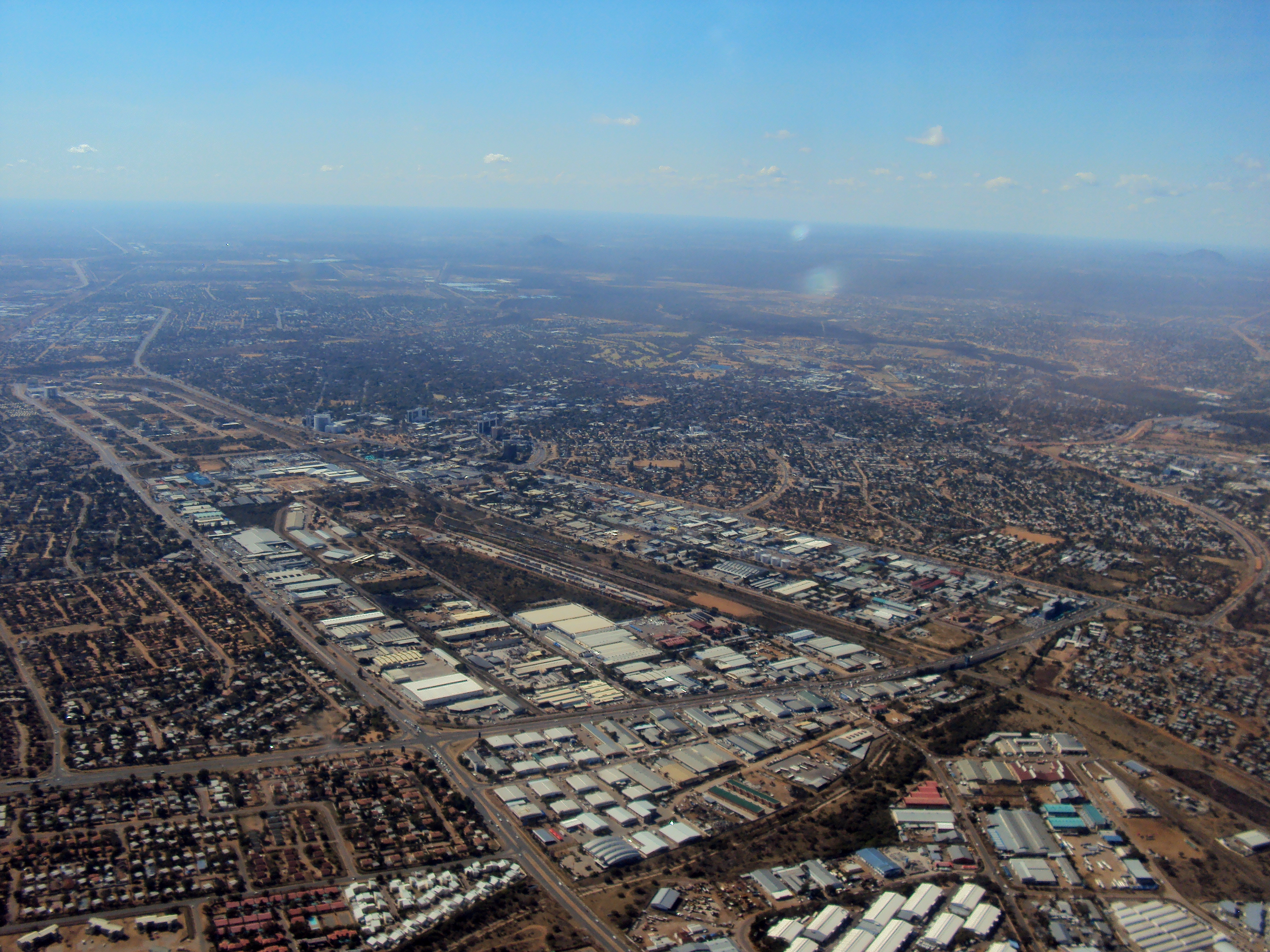
Aerial view of Gaborone, 2011

- 2001 - Population: 186,007.
- 2002 - Reteng founded.
- 2003 - Uniao Flamengo Santos Football Club formed.
- 2004 - Harry Mothei becomes mayor.
- 2005 - The Voice Newspaper becomes Botswana's best selling newspaper and goes digital.
- 2005 - Population: 208,000.
- 2007 - National Botanical Garden opens.
- 2009
  - Steinmetz Gaborone Marathon begins.
  - Veronica Lesole becomes mayor.
- 2011
  - May: 2011 African Junior Athletics Championships held.
  - Haskins Nkaigwa becomes mayor.
- 2013 - De Beers rough diamond sales headquarters relocated to Gaborone from London.
- 2014 - May: 2014 African Youth Games held in Gaborone.
- 2017 - Population: 264,311 (estimate).
- 2019 - Thata Father Maphongo becomes mayor.

== See also ==
- History of Gaborone
- List of mayors of Gaborone

== Bibliography ==
- Paul Tiyambe Zeleza; Dickson Eyoh, eds. (2003). "Gaborone, Botswana". Encyclopedia of Twentieth-Century African History. Routledge. ISBN 0-415-23479-4.
- Luc J. A. Mougeot, ed. (2005). "(Gaborone)". Agropolis: The Social, Political, and Environmental Dimensions of Urban Agriculture. International Development Research Centre. ISBN 978-1-55250-186-3.
- Fred Morton; et al. (2008). Historical Dictionary of Botswana (4th ed.). Scarecrow Press. ISBN 978-0-8108-6404-7. (+ 3rd ed. fulltext via Internet Archive)
- Andrew Hermann (2010). "Gaborone, Botswana". In Anthony Appiah and Henry Louis Gates (ed.). Encyclopedia of Africa. Oxford University Press. ISBN 978-0-19-533770-9.
