= Ben Martins =

South African politician (born 1956)

Ben Martins MP
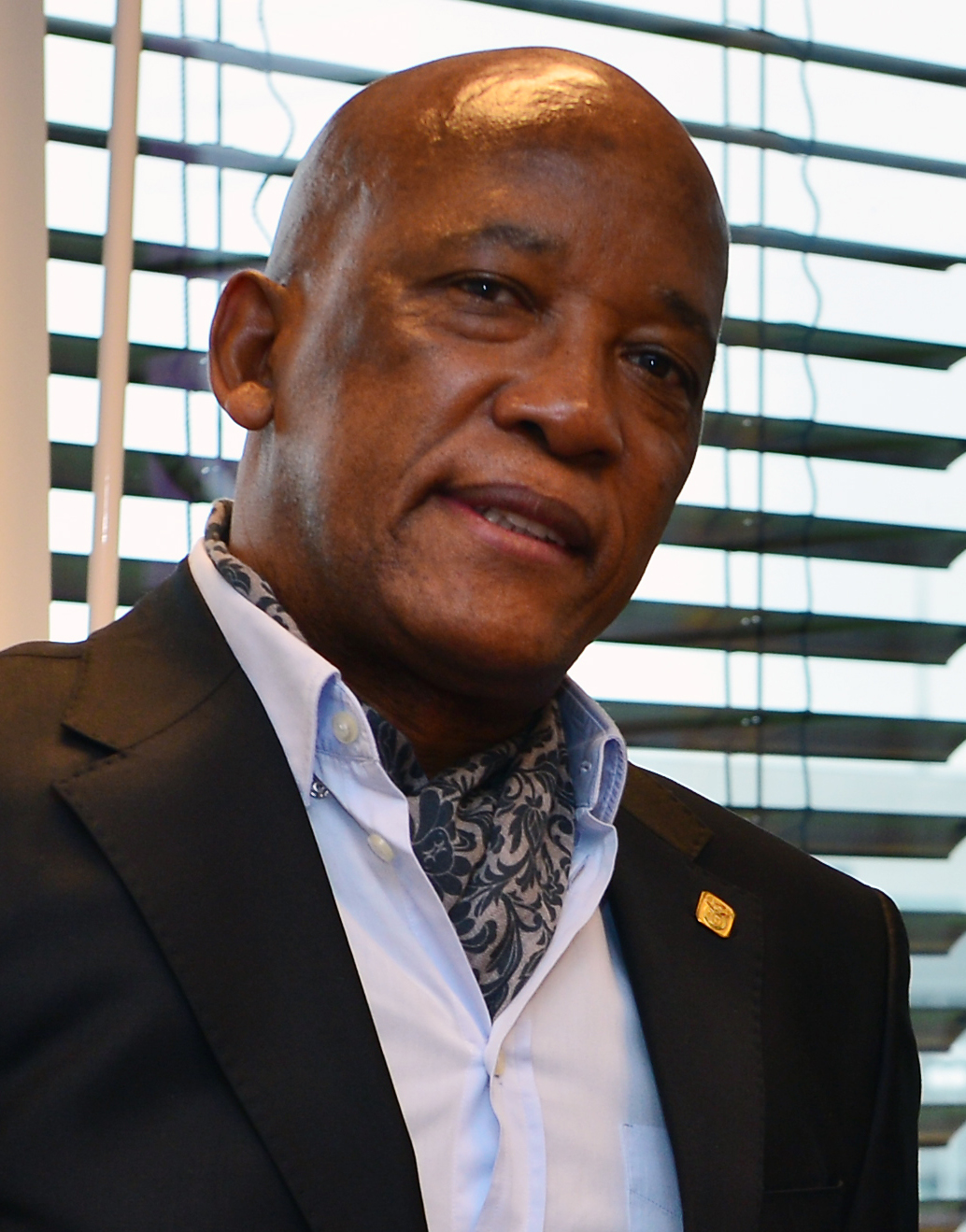

Minister of Energy
- In office 10 July 2013 – 25 May 2014
- President: Jacob Zuma
- Deputy: Barbara Thompson
- Preceded by: Dipuo Peters
- Succeeded by: Tina Joemat-Pettersson

Minister of Transport
- In office 12 June 2012 – 9 July 2013
- President: Jacob Zuma
- Deputy: Lydia Sindiswe Chikunga
- Preceded by: S'bu Ndebele
- Succeeded by: Dipuo Peters

Deputy Minister of Public Enterprises
- In office 1 November 2010 – 12 June 2012
- President: Jacob Zuma

Personal details
- Born: 2 September 1956 (age 70) Alexandra township, Johannesburg, Gauteng
- Party: African National Congress; South African Communist Party
- Education: University of South Africa; University of Cape Town; University of Natal

Dikobe Ben Martins (born 2 September 1956, Alexandra township, Gauteng), is a former Minister of Energy and has held other posts in the Cabinet of South Africa. He has served in Parliament since 1994 and has been a Central Committee Member of the South African Communist Party.

== Education ==
Ben Martins was born in Alexandra Township in Johannesburg and attended school at St Joseph's School in Aliwal North, Bechet College in Durban and Coronationville High School in Johannesburg. He received a Bachelor of Arts degree from the University of South Africa, a Bachelor of Law (LLB) degree from the University of Natal (now the University of KwaZulu-Natal) and a Master of Law Degree (LLM) as well as a Post Graduate Diploma in Management Practice from the University of Cape Town.

== Early activist career ==
Martins was a member of the Black Consciousness Movement beginning in the 1970s. He was utilized for his artistic background after having studied at Bill Ainslie's studio and at the Federated Union of Black Artists (FUBA) with the likes of Johnny Rieberio, Fikile Magadlela and Thamsanqa Mnyele. As a graphic artist, he produced protest T-shirts and made posters for the movement, later producing the famous poster distributed at Steve Biko's funeral. In the late 1970s, he traveled to Botswana and Lesotho to meet with activists-in-exile such as Mnyele and Wally Serote and in 1979, became a member of the African National Congress (later joining Umkhonto we Sizwe, the armed branch of the ANC). He was made the chief coordinator of the visual art committee in South Africa for assisting artists to attend the Culture and Resistance Conference and Festival in Gaborone. From 1977 up to the time of his arrest he worked and ran art workshops while setting up one of the earliest silk screen and poster making collectives at the Old Mill building in Pietermaritzburg.

During the 1980s, he produced T-shirts and posters for the United Democratic Front, while also contributing poetry, essays, and graphics to Staffrider magazine, an important and explicitly non-racial literary production in the 70s and 80s written for the general public about daily life in South Africa.

He was later arrested under the Terrorism Act and from 1983 to 1991, was jailed at Robben Island and in Johannesburg. For a period of seven months prior to trial, he was placed in solitary confinement and tortured by the security police. During his time on trial and in prison, he was able to write a book of poetry entitled Baptism of Fire, published in 1984. After his release, he took a job working for the African National Congress and the South African Communist Party. In addition, he released his second work in 1992, Prison Poems.

== Political career ==
Ben Martins became a Member of Parliament after the first democratic elections in South Africa in 1994. While serving in Parliament, he was appointed by President Jacob Zuma to serve as Deputy Minister of Public Enterprises, which he did from November 1, 2010 to June 12, 2012. During a subsequent cabinet reshuffle, he was promoted to become Minister of Transport, serving from June 2012 to July 2013. He was then appointed to become Minister of Energy on July 10, 2013. He was unsuccessful in a bid to become a member of the ANC National Executive Committee in 2012.

== Role in the art community ==
As politics must teach people the ways and give them the means to take control over their own lives, art must teach people, in the most vivid and imaginative ways possible, to take control over their own experience and observations, how to link these with the struggle for liberation and a just society free of race, class and exploitation.

In addition to his governmental duties, he is a Member of Council of the Robben Island Museum and an Executive Committee Member of the Caversham Centre for writers and artists. He continues to be a patron of the Congress of South African Writers (COSAW). He is still a practicing artist, with his artwork forming part of the permanent Art collection of the Killie Campbell Collection of the University of KwaZulu-Natal, the Pretoria and Johannesburg Art Galleries, as well as that of numerous private collections.

== Allegations of involvement in state capture ==
In November 2017 the suspended head of legal affairs for state company Eskom, Suzanne Daniels, testified before a Parliamentary committee into state capture that Martins had been present at a meeting where Gupta family associate Salim Essa attempted to interfere in Eskom's affairs. Martins responded the next day that he had never been part of such a "phantom coffee tea party meeting" but would have to consult his diary to say where he had been on the day.

Martins said he had been introduced to the Gupta family by Lucky Montana, then CEO of state company Prasa. Montana countered that it had been Martins who had introduced him to the Gupta family.

Political offices
Preceded by Dipuo Peters	Minister of Energy; 10 July 2013 – 25 May 2014	Succeeded by Tina Joemat-Pettersson
Preceded by S'bu Ndebele	Minister of Transport; 12 June 2012 – 09 July 2013	Succeeded by Dipuo Peters
