= Medu Art Ensemble =

Cultural activist collective (1979–1986)

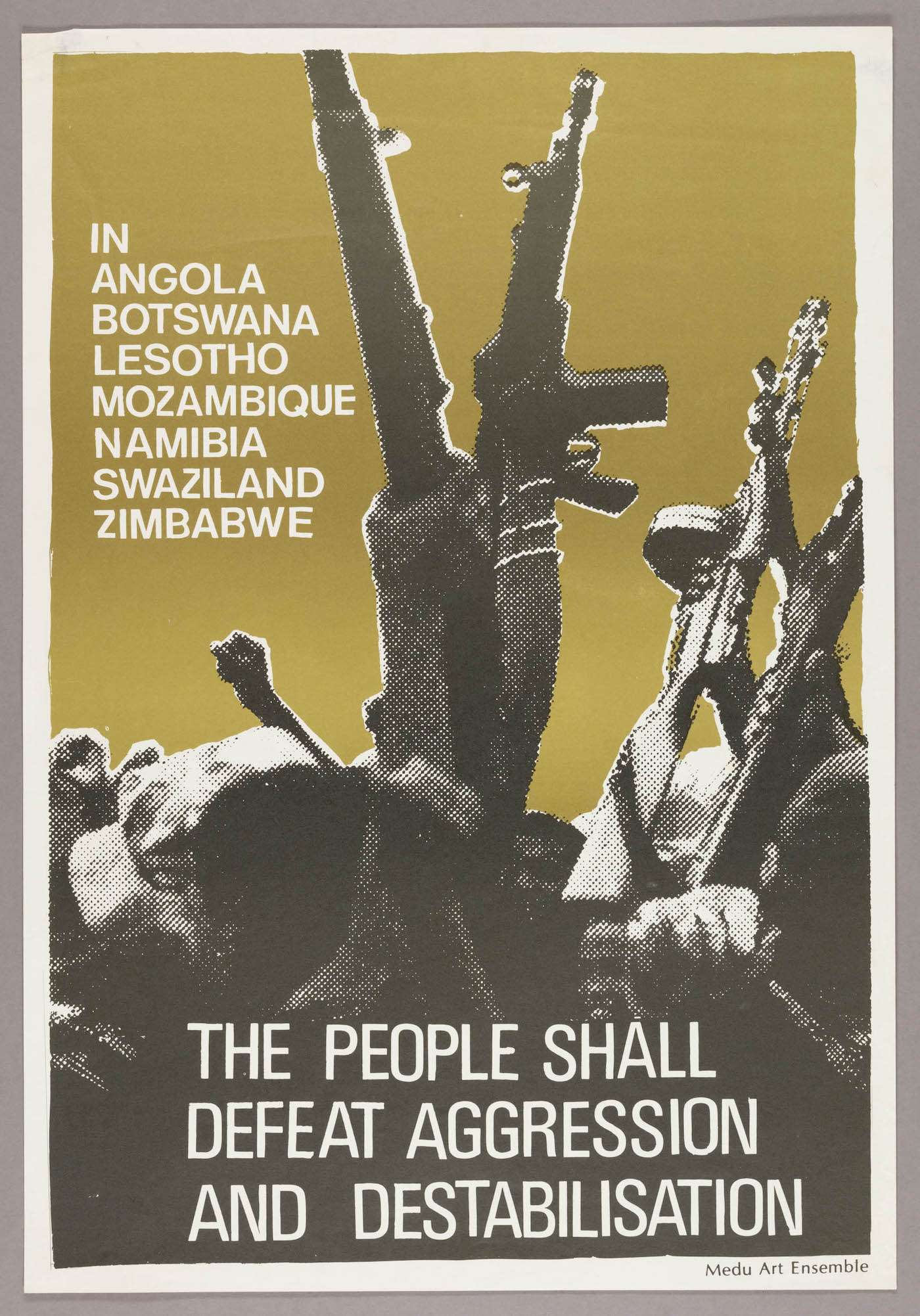
Medu Art Ensemble, The People Shall Defeat Aggression and Destabilisation, 1983

Medu Art Ensemble (1979–1985) was a multiracial, Pan-African, and anti-colonial collective of cultural activists based in Gaborone, Botswana during the height of the anti-apartheid resistance movement during the late twentieth century. The collective formed originally in 1979 and was formed to give voice to South Africa’s apartheid policy of racial segregation (1948–1994) and liberation struggles in neighboring countries Angola, Botswana, Mozambique, Namibia, and Zimbabwe. The group was formed after the 1976 Soweto Uprising, when many South African activists were forced into exile. The group was composed of over 60 musicians, performance artists, visual artists, researchers, writers, and poets. Most of the members were South African, but some were from the United States of America, Canada, Cuba, Brazil, Sweden, and Botswana. As a "non-aligned" group, Medu worked with artists from various racial, social, political, and cultural backgrounds. Medu’s members, or “cultural workers” as they preferred to be called, eventually organized and relocated to Gaborone, Botswana in 1978. They felt that the term "cultural workers" was far more fitting to their mission rather than referring to themselves as artists because the such a pursuit was regarded as something trivial and therefore inherently elitist and white. With the support of the African National Congress (ANC), in Gaborone, Medu officially registered as a cultural organization with the Botswanan government. Medu means “roots” in the Northern Sotho language Sepedi, and describes the collective's underground operations (in defiance of the apartheid government's ban on oppositional political parties and organizations). The collective’s cultural work was divided into six units; Publications and Research, Graphic Arts and Design, Music, Theatre, Photography, and Film.

In Gaborone, Medu organized concerts, conducted art and creative writing workshops, produced films, organized public health campaigns, and mounted exhibitions among other activities. The collective also produced agitational newsletters and political posters, both of which sought to simultaneously bolster regional solidarity, critique the injustices of the apartheid state, and promote black consciousness. One of Medu's flagship events was the 1982 Culture and Resistance Festival and Symposium, which brought thousands of activists, cultural workers, and ordinary people together (from across Africa, the Americas, and Europe) for a week of concerts, exhibitions, talks, workshops and other forms of radical cultural programing. This massive undertaking brought greater attention to Medu's activism, heightening in particular the apartheid government's scrutiny of collective's work. Medu disbanded in 1985, following the South African Defence Force's murderous Raid on Gaborone, which resulted in the death of twelve people, including Medu members Mike Hamlyn, Thamsanga Mnyele, George Phahle, and Lindi Phahle.

== Members ==
As a multiracial collective of cultural workers, Medu comprised more than sixty visual artists, performers, and writers who were collectively invested in regional liberation and resistance to apartheid rule. Members of the collective included Gwen Ansell, Theresa Devant, Sergio-Albio González, Jonas Gwangwa, Basil Jones, Michael Kahn, Heinz Klug, Keorapetse Kgositsile, Adrian Kohler, Mandla Langa, Hugh Masekela, Gordon Metz, Thamsanqa Mnyele, Judy Seidman, Mongane Wally Serote, Pethu Serote, and Tim Williams, among many others. The collective originally consisted of just black South African's as its founding members were very much inspired by the Black Consciousness Movement which held the belief, among others, that white sympathisers were ‘more of a hindrance than a help to their cause’. Evidently this position of belief changed and was adapted to fit the ideal of a future South Africa that would be home to all men regardless of race and white people were allowed to join and as such it helped gain international funding for the Ensemble.

== Inspirations ==
Members of the Medu Art Ensemble were inspired by artists around the world. Although the group considered themselves to be an ideologically diverse group, their artworks lean towards socialist and communist teachings. The members were influenced by various liberation struggles worldwide and wanted to break away from mainstream art institutions, and Marxist artists all around the world. Theorists such as Frantz Fanon, Mao Zedong, and Bertolt Brecht, with African writers such as Wole Soyinka and Ngũgĩ wa Thiong’o furthered the group's cultural thinking. The iconography found across the collective's posters partakes of an international socialist and revolutionary lexicon of broken chains, clenched fists, upraised arms, and heroic depictions of activists and freedom fighters. This symbolism originated in World War I–era labor and anti-oppression movements across the world and was expressed in the work of Soviet and antifascist poster makers, Mexican muralists and print workshop members, and participants in the Harlem Renaissance. Because these cross-cultural influences went against the rigid notions of art, Medu used their work to reflect on the realities of oppressed people under apartheid.

== Posters ==
Medu played a formative role in shaping the visual culture of resistance in South Africa during the late 1970s and early 1980s along with other key printmaking initiatives such as Junction Avenue, Screen Training Project, and Cape Town Arts Project. Operating both contemporaneously with and after Medu, these collectives also issued posters to inform and galvanize their compatriots, countering the disinformation campaigns and ideologies promulgated by the apartheid government.

The first of Medu's six units to emerge was Publications and Research, which served as the collective’s mouthpiece and administrative organ by generating the collective's meeting minutes, quarterly newsletters, and other publications. This unit operated symbiotically with the Graphics Unit, which designed covers for the newsletters and produced the posters for which Medu is best known. Members of the Graphic Arts Movement included Thami Mnyele, Miles Pelo, Heinz Klug, Judy Seidman, Gordon Metz Albio and Theresa Gonzales, Philip Segola, and Lentswe Mokgatle. Medu produced over 100 posters during its lifetime, using a range of printing techniques including offset lithograph, and screen printing. These techniques allowed Medu's posters to be mass produced and spread to the general public. The posters were often folded inside of newsletters and clandestinely smuggled into South Africa where they were often posted in public spaces before being torn down by state police or censors. Numerous examples of Medu's posters appeared on official censorship registries in accordance with apartheid state's 1974 Publications Act which outlined materials the regime deemed "undesirable," or potentially threatening to apartheid law; during the 1980s, newspapers such as the Rand Daily Mail ran columns on censored material, many of which included Medu's posters and newsletters.

Medu's posters range in their content. Posters intended for South African audiences forcefully scrutinized the pernicious mechanism and brutality of apartheid through bold imagery and slogans, commemorated activists and events, while others promoted the various cultural activities Medu's Film, Photography, Theatre, and Music units organized in Gaborone. The posters were typically produced through dialogue among Medu's participants, with individuals or groups of members contributing to different designs before presenting proposals to the entire collective for approval. While posters for temporal-specific events such as concerts were often produced in short runs, others with evergreen political content were issued in the hundreds, especially in the lead up to the collective's 1982 Culture and Resistance Festival and Symposium where posters were given out to attendees.

Today the Medu posters serve as a rich source, they provide information that has little to no documentation elsewhere as South Africa's harsh censorship laws forbid such intelligence to be shared in the country. Gaborone in Botswana was an ideal location for the Collective not just geographically (very close to the border to South Africa and neighboring to a number of Africa countries) but also this distance served as a chance for artists to work outside of the numerous censorship laws, a chance to express themselves and to be free of the restrictive Apartheid laws. The Medu Ensemble were not the first ones to discover the advantages of the capital, the Afrikaans couple Marius and Jeanette Schoon had set the works in place in 1977 when they founded bases there for the anti-apartheid movement.

== 1982 Culture and Resistance Festival and Symposium ==
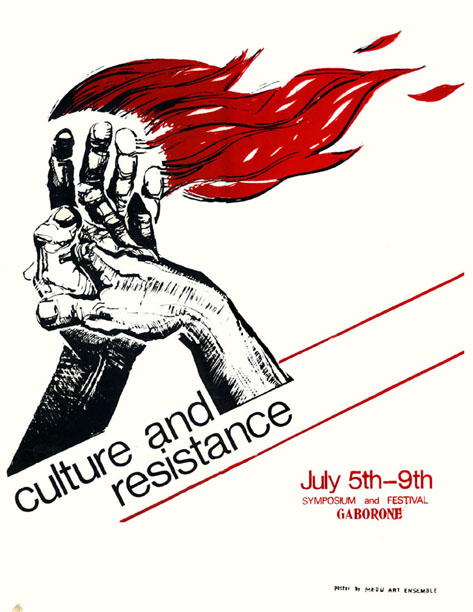
Thami Mnyele's poster for the 1982 Culture and Resistance Symposium

One of Medu’s most notable acts was their July 5 to 9, 1982 Culture and Resistance Festival and Symposium in which hundreds of artists from around the world gathered at the University of Botswana to emphasize the importance of culture for southern African liberation from apartheid and colonialism. The conference’s main goal was to redefine people’s definition of art and use it as a form of resistance to help their community. The conference allowed Medu's posters to gain traction and exposure to the public. The symposium was organized by members of the ANC and leaders of Medu, Wally Serote, Thami Mnyele, and Sergio-Albio González. Events from the conference included Art Toward Social Development curated by David Koloane and Emile Maurice, consisting of paintings, photography, live music, poetry, and theater performances. Around 300 art pieces were displayed in the exhibition. Artists collaborated and created t-shirts, political pins, and other forms of art. Printmaking was a significant aspect of the conference as artists collaborated to create graphics for the anti-apartheid movement. The festival included performances from Junction Avenue Theatre Company’s Marabi, a musical focusing on the culture within the South African working class, and well-known live musical acts Hugh Masekela, Barry Gilder, and Abdullah Ibrahim. The festival and symposium allowed cultural workers to interact and engage in each other's works and influenced new forms of multiracial cultural resistance including the United Democratic Front and the Silkscreen Training Project to fight against apartheid.

=== The Necessity of Art for National Liberation ===
Medu and ANC member Dikobe wa Mogale Ben Martins opened the symposium with the speech, ‘The Necessity of Art for National Liberation’. Referencing Austrian art historian Ernst Fischer’s, The Necessity of Art: A Marxist Approach (1959) Martins claimed that artists have the responsibility to teach the general public about social issues and stimulate their social and class consciousness in the struggle for liberation and the world around them. Martins argued, "As politics must teach people the ways and give them the means to take control over their own lives, art must teach people, in the most vivid and imaginative ways possible, how to take control over their own experience and observations, how to link these with the struggle for liberation and a just society free of race, class and exploitation."

== Raid on Gaborone ==
The Medu Art Ensemble's ties with the African National Congress (ANC) and the Umkhonto We Sizwe (MK) its paramilitary wing are a contentious issue. Due to the Ensemble's underground nature, clear evidence is limited. The ANC was banned by the South African government in 1960 but their operations continued in secret. Officially the Medu were not tied with the ANC and the Ensemble claimed to be impartial but Medu member poet Dr Wally Serote describes the Medu members as "cadres of the ANC." The Ensemble's involvement may have fuelled their motives but it may have also contributed to their downfall and abrupt end as the SADF forces claim that their Botswana Raid 1985 was motivated by their intelligence that alleged that they were to attack ANC members.

At 1:40am on 14 June 1985 the South African Defense Forces (SADF) crossed the border into Botswana and began a raid that lasted a total of 40 minutes. The raid killed twelve people including Thami Mnyele and Cecil George Phahle (only two were Medu members) and others injured.

== Aftermath ==
Succeeding the raid, the Botswana government banned the remaining members from honoring the victims. With not enough people to mass produce posters and the constant threat of an attack, the Medu Art Ensemble disbanded soon after the raid. Many of the surviving members left Botswana to continue their political work whereas others remained and practiced underground. After the disbandment, little was known about the whereabouts of the remaining Medu posters. Some were snuck into South Africa and publicly displayed, but most were confiscated, or destroyed by the SADF.

After the attack, the representative of Botswana for the United Nations called for an urgent meeting of the Council where the event was called an "unprovoked and unwarranted attack. The United Nations Resolution 568 drafted on 21 June 1985 ordered ‘full and adequate compensation by South Africa to Botswana' for the damages and Botswana's status and place of refugee for those affected by the apartheid regime was reiterated.

In 2002, the Truth and Reconciliation Commission claimed that because the raid went outside the South African borders, perpetrators of the raid could not be tried and persecuted. Only the men who were tried for the raid were the informants for the raid, who were granted amnesty.

== Exhibitions ==
Medu's work has been the subject of several exhibitions. In 2008, the Johannesburg Art Gallery mounted the exhibition Thami Mnyele + Medu Art Ensemble, which centered on the work of Thamsanqa (Thami) Mnyele and his contributions to Medu's Graphics Unit. This comprehensive exhibition brought together artwork by Mnyele, a substantial collection of Medu's posters, and archival documents, media, and ephemera attesting to the collective's cultural programming and tragic dissolution.

Medu's posters were included in the 2011 exhibition, Impressions from South Africa,1965 to Now at the Museum of Modern Art, New York.

In 2019, the Art Institute of Chicago organized The People Shall Govern! Medu Art Ensemble and the Anti-Apartheid Poster, the first exhibition on Medu's work in North America. The exhibition featured approximately 130 of Medu's artwork consisting of t-shirts, banners, and 60 known posters.

== Bibliography ==
Key sources of scholarship on Medu Art Ensemble include:

- Antawan I. Byrd and Felicia Mings, eds., The People Shall Govern! Medu Art Ensemble and the Anti-Apartheid Poster (Art Institute of Chicago & Yale University Press, 2020)
- Shannen L. Hill, Biko's Ghost: the Iconography of Black Consciousness (Minneapolis: University of Minnesota Press, 2015)
- Molemo Moiloa, ed., 58 Years of the Treason Trial: Inter-Generational Dialogue as a Method of Learning (Johannesburg: Keleketla Media Arts Project NPC, 2012)
- John Peffer, Art and the End of Apartheid. Minneapolis (Minnesota: University of Minnesota Press, 2009)
- Diana Wylie, Art + Revolution: The Life and Death of Thami Mnyele, South African Artist (Auckland Park: Jacana, 2008)
- Clive Kellner and Sergio-Albio González, eds., Thami Mnyele + Medu Art Ensemble Retrospective: Johannesburg Art Gallery (Johannesburg: Jacana Media, 2008)
- Judy Seidman, Red on Black: The Story of the South African Poster Movement (Johannesburg: STE Publishers, 2007)
- Giorgio Miescher, Dag Henrichsen, eds., African Posters: A Catalogue of the Poster Collection in the Basler Afrika Bibliographien (Basel: Basler Afrika-Bibliographien, 2004)
- Images of Defiance: South African Resistance Posters of the 1980s (Johannesburg: STE Publishers, 2004)

== Collections ==
Posters (and in some case, newsletters) by Medu Art Ensemble can be found in numerous public collections including:

- South African History Archive
- Freedom Park Archives
- University of the Western Cape, Robben Island Museum
- The Art Institute of Chicago
- Museum of Modern Art, New York
- Basler Afrika Bibliographien, Basel, Switzerland
