= History of Gaborone =

Past events that made Gaborone

Historical population
Year	Pop.	±%
1964	3,855	—
1971	17,718	+359.6%
1981	59,657	+236.7%
1991	133,468	+123.7%
2001	186,007	+39.4%
2011	231,592	+24.5%

The history of Gaborone began with archaeological evidence in the area around Gaborone dating back to 400 BCE, and the first written accounts of Gaborone are from the earliest European settlers in the 19th century. Since the 1960s, when Botswana gained its independence from Britain and Gaborone became the capital, the city has grown from a small village in the Botswana scrubland to a major center in southern Africa.

== Early history ==
Evidence shows that there have been inhabitants along the Notwane River for centuries, all the way back to the Middle Stone Age. The area that is now modern-day Botswana was inhabited exclusively by the Khoikhoi pastoralists, who valued cattle because of nutritional benefits, until around the 8th century CE when the Toutswe people arrived in Botswana. The Toutswe (also called the Toutswemogala society after their main settlement, Toutswemogala) settled in the area around Palapye and Serowe, and they introduced the cultivation of sorghum and millet. By 900 CE, the Toutswe culture started to gain a foothold in Botswana. Like the earlier Khoikhoi people, the Toutswe society heavily centered around cattle: kraals, or cattle enclosures, have been found in numerous locations around eastern Botswana. In this society, wealth and hierarchy were based on the number of cows, not on the amount of gold such as in the adjacent Mapungubwe society. The Toutswe engaged in long-distance trade, acquiring beads and porcelain. The Toutswe culture started to collapse in the 13th century due to overgrazing and drought; however the prestige of cattle remained in Botswana society.

== 19th century ==
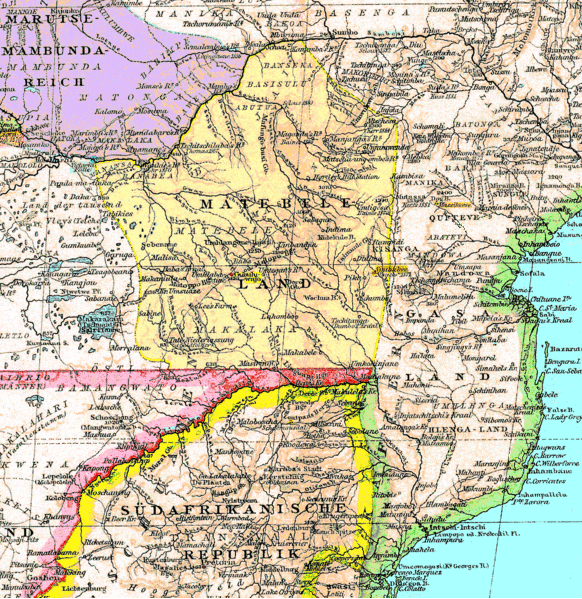
German map of Matabeleland with the city of Gaborone (referred to as Moschaweng) in the lower left-hand corner on the border between the Bechuanaland Protectorate (pink) and the South African Republic (bright yellow)

The Mfecane (the crushing or scattering in Zulu) is a period in the early 19th century marked by major upheavals and migrations of the tribes in southern Africa. Before the arrival of Europeans to the area, the Batswana were the dominant ethnic group in the southern half of Botswana, subjugating the Bakgalagadi people and the Khoikhoi to become malata or servants. In the 1830s, the Boers embarked on the Great Trek from the Cape Colony towards the northeast. This movement caused the Amandebele people, led by Mzilikazi, to attack the Batswana as they moved northwards to present-day Zimbabwe in the 1830s, forcing them to pay tribute. The Bakololo people also fought with the Batswana during this time when they migrated to Barotseland in modern-day western Zambia. Along with the Bakololo and the Amandebele, the Boers also created skirmishes with the Batswana. Kgosi Seshele I (kgosi means chief in Tswana) of the Bakwena led the Batswana side during the Battle of Dimawe from 1852–1853. An agreement was signed between the Boers and the Batswana in January 1853.

During this time, European missionaries from the London Missionary Society, such as David Livingstone and Robert Moffat, spread Christianity throughout the region. David Livingstone started the first church and school in 1845 at the Kolobeng Mission, near Gaborone.

In the 1880s, Kgosi Gaborone of the Batlokoa clan left the Magaliesberg area in the South African province of North West to settle in the southeastern part of Botswana and called the settlement Moshaweng. There is an unrelated Moshaweng in the Kweneng District northwest of Gaborone. The city that Kgosi Gaborone founded was first called Gaborone's Village by the first European settlers. It was later shortened to Gaberones. Cecil Rhodes, a mining magnate and founder of the De Beers mining company, built a fort for colonial administration across the river from Gaberones. The fort was where Rhodes planned the Jameson Raid during the Second Boer War. The site of the fort became Gaborone and the city of Gaberones became Tlokweng.

After gold was discovered in South Africa in 1871, Khama III of the Bamangwato tribe made an alliance with the United Kingdom against advancing Boer gold miners. On 31 March 1885, the United Kingdom created the Bechuanaland Protectorate from the land north of the Molopo River to the Caprivi Strip of German South-West Africa. The area south of the Molopo River became part of South Africa.

Until the 1890s, Britain ruled Bechuanaland indirectly, letting the dikgosi (plural of kgosi) rule themselves. Things changed when Cecil Rhodes established the British South Africa Company with a government charter. Rhodes wanted to have control over the entire southern African region. Three dikgosi, Khama III, Sebele I, and Bathoen I, traveled to Great Britain in 1895 to ask Queen Victoria not to incorporate Botswana into Rhodes's company or other British colonies like Southern Rhodesia or the Cape Colony, and they proved successful. Today, in Gaborone, there is a memorial called the Three Dikgosi Monument in honor of the three chiefs who helped the founding of Bechuanaland and later Botswana.

== 20th century ==
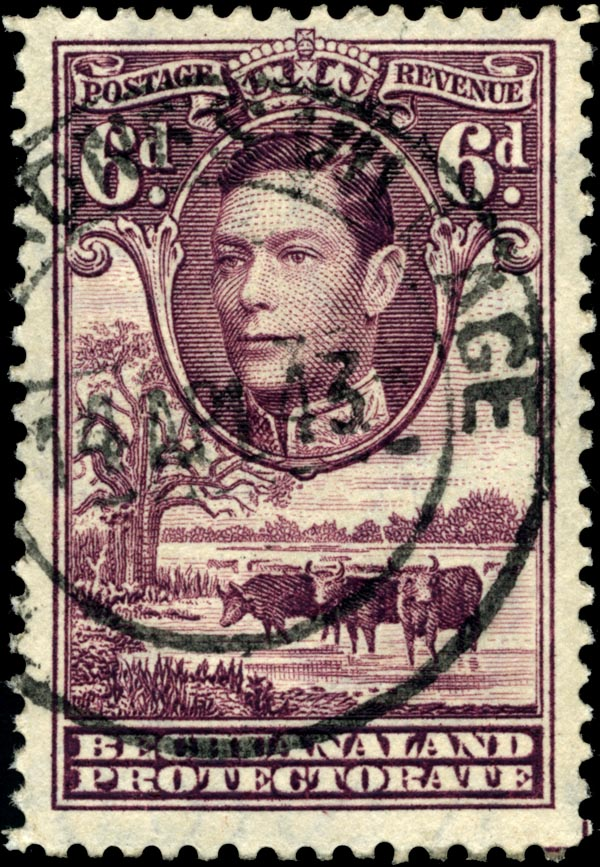
A postage stamp c.1943, the postmark reading "Gaberone's Village"

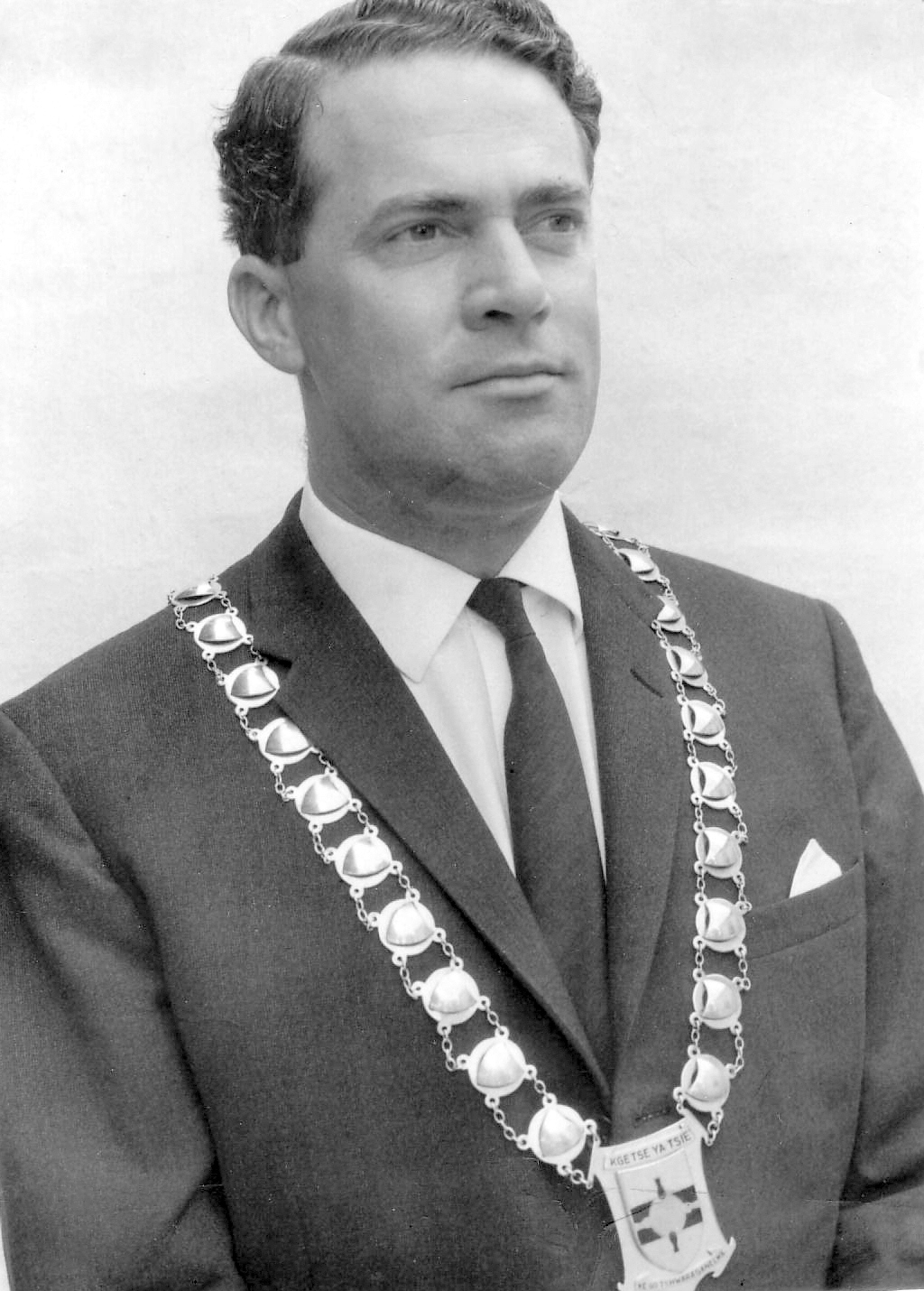
Rev. Derek Jones, the first mayor of Gaborone

From 1961 to 1965, the city experienced a major drought, killing more than 250,000 head of cattle.

In 1965, the capital of the Bechuanaland Protectorate moved from Mafeking to Gaberones. When Botswana gained its independence, Lobatse was the first choice as the nation's capital. However, Lobatse was deemed too limited, and instead, a new capital city would be created next to Gaberones. The city was chosen because of its proximity to a fresh water source, its proximity to the railway to Pretoria, and its central location among the central tribes. Another reason Gaborone was picked to be capital was that it had a history of being the administrative center of Botswana. During the Second Boer War, the city served as the temporary capital of Bechuanaland while Mafikeng was under siege by the Boers. Gaborone was not affiliated with any tribe either, another reason for its designation as the capital. The old colonial Gaberones became a suburb of the new Gaberones and is now known as "the Village".

On 30 September 1966, Bechuanaland became the eleventh British dependency in Africa to become independent. The first mayor of Gaborone was Reverend Derek Jones.

The city was planned under Garden city principles with numerous pedestrian walkways and open spaces. The building of Gaborone started in mid-1964. During the city's construction, the chairman of Gaberones Township Authority, Geoffrey Cornish, likened the layout of the city to a “brandy glass” with the government offices in the base of the glass and businesses in the “mall”, a strip of land extending from the base.

Most of the city was built within three years, earlier than expected so the government offices could move in earlier. 2,000 workers helped construct the city, shoveling 140,000 cubic yards (110,000 m^{3}) and making 2,500,000 blocks of concrete. Buildings in early Gaborone include assembly buildings, government offices, a power station, a hospital, schools, a radio station, a telephone exchange, police stations, a post office, more than 1,000 houses and apartments, a British high commission, a library, a brewery, a church, and numerous other structures. By 1966, the population of Gaborone was about 5,000 people.

The city changed its name from Gaberones to Gaborone in 1969.

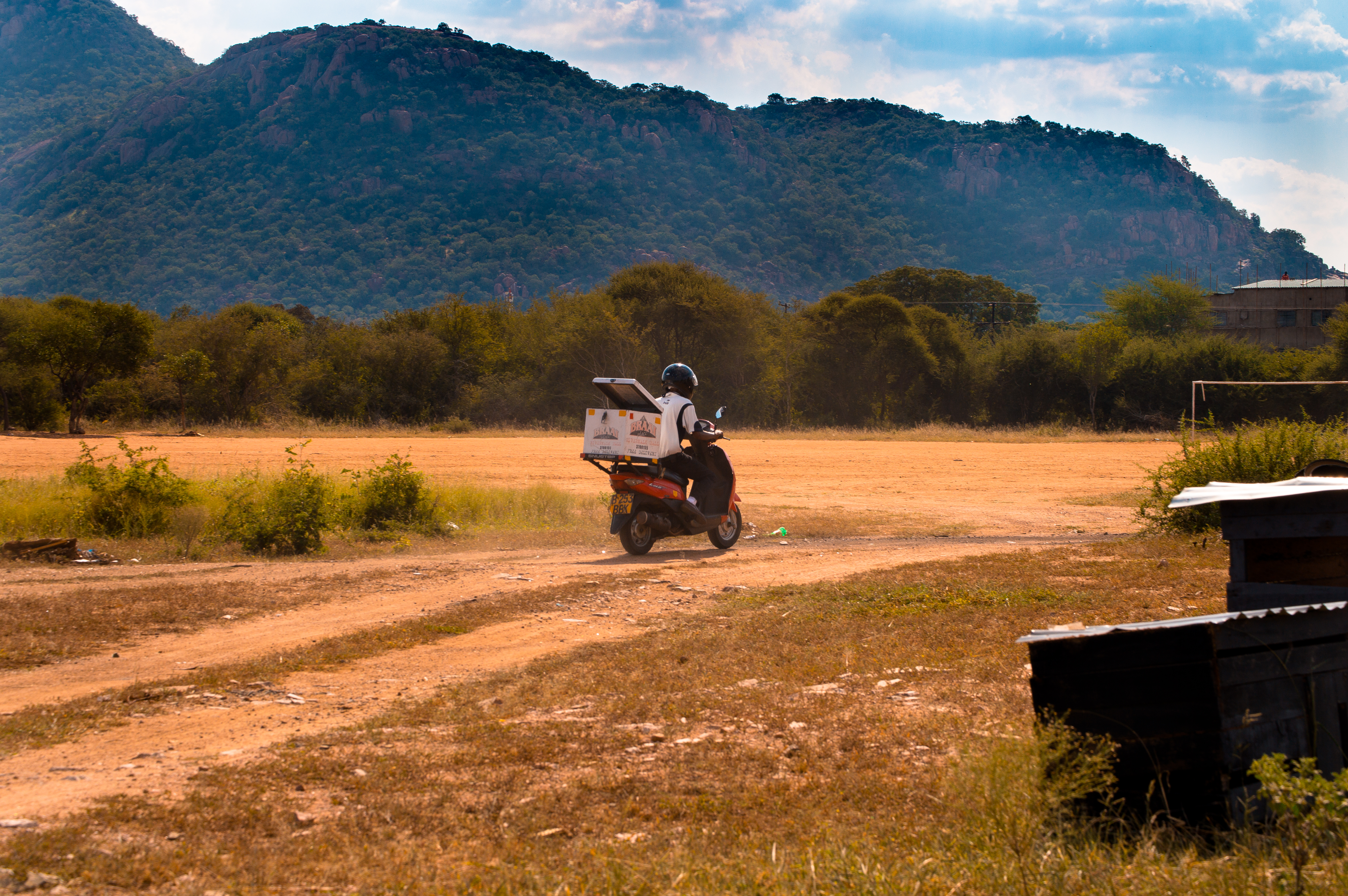
Delivery man at Old Naledi

Because the city was built so quickly, there was a massive influx of labourers who had built illegal settlements on the new city's southern industrial development zone. These settlements were named Naledi. Naledi literally means the star, but could also mean under the open sky or a community that stands out from all others. In 1971, because of the growth of illegal settlements, the Gaborone Town Council and the Ministry of Local Government and Lands surveyed an area called Bontleng, which would contain low-income housing. However, Naledi still grew, and the demand for housing was greater than ever. In 1973, the Botswana Housing Corporation (BHC) built a "New Naledi" across the road from the "Old Naledi". Residents from Old Naledi would be moved to New Naledi. However, the demand for housing increased yet again; moreover, the residents who relocated to New Naledi disliked the houses. The problem was solved in 1975 when Sir Seretse Khama, the president of Botswana, rezoned Naledi from an industrial zone to a low-income housing area.

In the 1970s, the city was involved in the conflicts of the Rhodesian Bush War and South Africa under apartheid. Thousands of South Africans and Rhodesians crossed the border into the country where they either stayed in Gaborone or Francistown, or flew to Zambia or Tanzania to participate in anti-apartheid movements or freedom-fighting activities with Joshua Nkomo's Zimbabwe African People's Union. The runaways put economic stress on the city, caused the standard of living to decrease, and created tensions not only between the governments of Botswana, South Africa, and Rhodesia but also between the citizens within Botswana and the refugees. A quote from a government official summarizes the conundrum:

In this part of the country the Botswana people are the refugees. When they see the assistance flowing into the camps, they want it also. They become beggars.

— J. H. Munamati

Gaborone has experienced a multitude of attacks by the South African military in the 1980s. On 13 May 1983, South Africa sent helicopters to attack the army base outside of Gaborone. On 14 June 1985, South Africa attacked an anti-apartheid group in the Raid on Gaborone. The raids resulted in twelve civilian deaths. After the raid, the United States withdrew its ambassador to South Africa. South African forces also ambushed the Botswana Defence Force barracks just northwest of the city towards Mogoditshane on 19 May 1986; a government worker was killed during the helicopter-borne attack. South Africa claimed that they were rooting out African National Congress terrorists. Another attack on 28 March 1988 left four dead in Gaborone.

Gaborone gained the title of city in 1986 after being classified as a town.

In 1992, the Southern African Development Community (SADC) was founded in Gaborone, uniting the economies of the member nations.

After the 1994 General Elections, riots started in Gaborone because of high unemployment and other issues.

Today, Gaborone is growing very rapidly. The city originally planned on 20,000 citizens, but by 1992, the city had 138,000 people. This has led to many squatter settlements on undeveloped land.

== See also ==
- Timeline of Gaborone
- History of Botswana
- Gaborone
- Postage stamps and postal history of Bechuanaland Protectorate
