= Judy Seidman =

American-born artist and anti-Apartheid activist (born 1951)

Judy Ann Seidman (born 1951) is an American-born visual artist and cultural activist based in Johannesburg, South Africa.

== Early life and education ==
Judy Seidman was born in Norwalk, Connecticut, USA. As a child she moved with her family to Ghana in 1962 during Kwame Nkrumah’s presidency, spending her youth there and attending Achimota Secondary School in Accra. Judy's early exposure to art and politics was through her family, her grandmother was an artist, a life-long political activist, feminist and pacifist. So, she was brought up with artmaking, particularly artmaking as an act of political activism. When Judy was five or six, she announced that she wanted to be a painter or a pirate

After Ghana’s 1966 coup d’état, Seidman’s family returned to the United States. She went to the University of Madison Wisconsin, receiving earning a Bachelor of Arts in Sociology and a Master of Fine Arts (Painting) by 1972. Soon after graduating she visited her parents (then teaching at the University of Zambia in Lusaka) and decided to remain in southern Africa.

== Career ==
Throughout the 1970s and 1980s, Seidman lived in southern Africa as an artist and teacher in exile. She and her husband (historian Neil Parsons) moved to Swaziland (Eswatini) in 1975, where she taught art at Thokoza School in Mbabane and gave birth to her first daughter. In 1980, Seidman and the family moved to Botswana, where she joined the Medu Art Ensemble an Anti-Apartheid resistance art movement. 1984 she held a solo exhibition (“Graphic Work by Judy Seidman”) at the National Museum and Art Gallery in Gaborone

After the unbanning of political organizations in 1990, Seidman moved to Johannesburg, where she continues to live and work. She designed several well-known political posters, including for the Congress of South African Trade Unions (COSATU) and the Convention for a Democratic South Africa (CODESA).

In the post-apartheid period, she focused on HIV/AIDS activism, gender equality, and public health campaigns. She has also contributed to art education, working on school curricula and facilitating community workshops. Her retrospective exhibition Drawn Lines was held at Museum Africa in 2019–2020.

== Artistic style ==
A Mail & Guardian critic noted that Seidman’s art was largely figurative and narrative, often featuring women, workers, and activists in scenes of struggle and empowerment. Her compositions often place Black liberation fighters and women at the center, deliberately countering colonial-era depictions that erased such figures.

== Notable works and exhibitions ==
Seidman has produced several iconic posters and among her best-known works are:

- Women’s Day Poster (1981), with the slogan “You strike a woman, you strike a rock.
- Solomon Mahlangu Memorial Poster (1982), honoring the executed activist
- COSATU 4th Congress Poster (1991)
- CODESA Sunrise Poster (1991–1992), symbolizing South Africa’s transition to democracy.
- COSAS AIDS Campaign Poster (1991).

== Publications ==
Seidman is the author of Red on Black: The Story of the South African Poster Movement (2007) and her memoir Drawn Lines (2017). She has also co-edited Images of Defiance: Protest Posters from South Africa 1980–1990 and written essays on art and politics.

== Legacy ==
Seidman is regarded as a key figure in South Africa’s liberation-era visual culture. Her posters are frequently cited as some of the most iconic images of the anti-apartheid movement. She continues to produce art and lecture internationally on the role of culture in social justice movements
