= Botswana–South Africa relations =

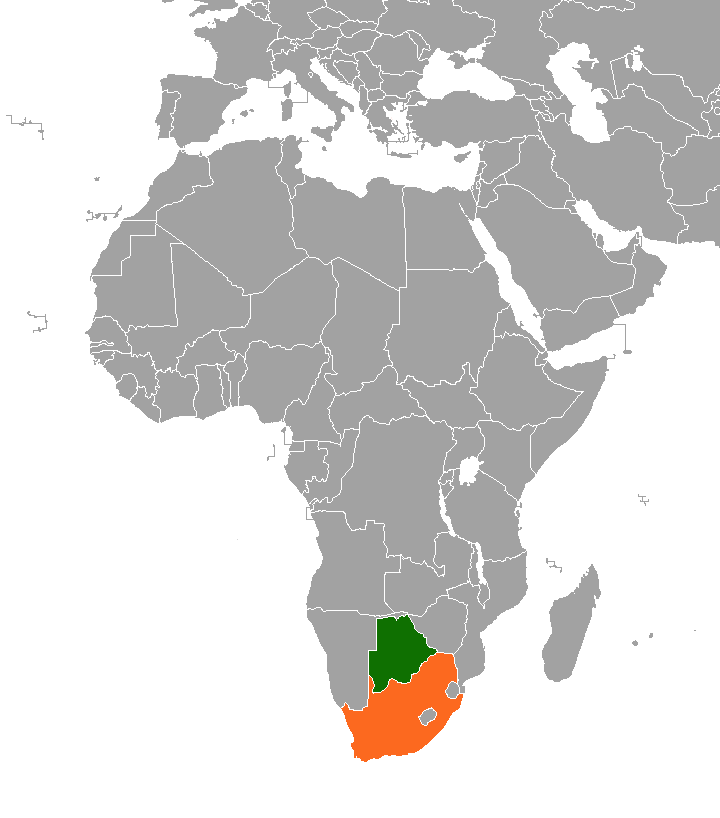
- Botswana: South Africa

Botswana–South Africa relations refers to the historical and current relationship of Botswana and South Africa. Botswana has a high commission in Pretoria, and South Africa has a high commission in Gaborone. Both countries are former British colonies and members of the African Union, the Commonwealth of Nations, and the Southern African Development Community (SADC).

== History ==
The foundation for this relationship dates back to the establishment of the Southern African Customs Union (SACU) in 1910.

In 1985 South Africa launched a military operation to Gaborone, attacking African National Congress targets in Botswana. These attacks were condemned by a spokesperson for US President Ronald Reagan.

In 1986, President Quett Masire of Botswana said South Africa's black neighbours would suffer the most if Western countries imposed economic sanctions on South Africa. He said, "Obviously, we can't prohibit the West from imposing sanctions on South Africa, and we welcome every form of pressure on the apartheid regime."

Relations between South Africa and Botswana were formalised by establishing representative offices in both countries in 1992. Upgrading relations to a full diplomatic level occurred on 22 June 1994.

The two countries enjoyed good relations during the presidencies of Thabo Mbeki and Festus Mogae. During the presidencies of Jacob Zuma and Ian Khama, relations declined due to differences over African Union appointments, South Africa's decision to withdraw from the International Criminal Court and Zimbabwe. In 2019, the Botswana Democratic Party, the ruling party of Botswana, joined the Former Liberation Movements of Southern Africa, which also includes the ANC.

== Cooperation ==
In 2003, South African President, Thabo Mbeki visited Botswana President Festus Mogae. The two countries issued a communique that said the two heads of state reviewed bilateral, regional, and international issues of mutual interest, such as the Agreement on the Establishment of a Joint Permanent Commission for Cooperation between Botswana and South Africa. The two leaders also expressed the need "to assist the people of Zimbabwe in addressing the problems confronting their country".

In November 2008, the Presidents of both countries agreed to work together to resolve the crisis in Zimbabwe following its presidential election.

== Agreements ==
- In 2003, the two countries signed a double taxation agreement.
- In 2005, the two countries signed six agreements to enhance cooperation in various fields, including agriculture, health, local government, sports, culture, and transport.
- In 2006, the environment ministers of the two countries, together with Zimbabwe, signed for a new transfrontier game park called the Limpopo-Shashe Transfrontier Conservation Area straddling the borders of Botswana, South Africa, and Zimbabwe.
- In 2007, Botswana Railways signed an agreement with South African rail operator Spoornet. The agreement will result in a joint business and harmonisation of expectations in terms and allocation of resources. This followed negotiations between the two operators in 2006.

== See also ==
- Foreign relations of Botswana
- Foreign relations of South Africa
