= Derek Jones (mayor) =

English-Motswana politician and missionary

The Reverend Derek Jones OBE
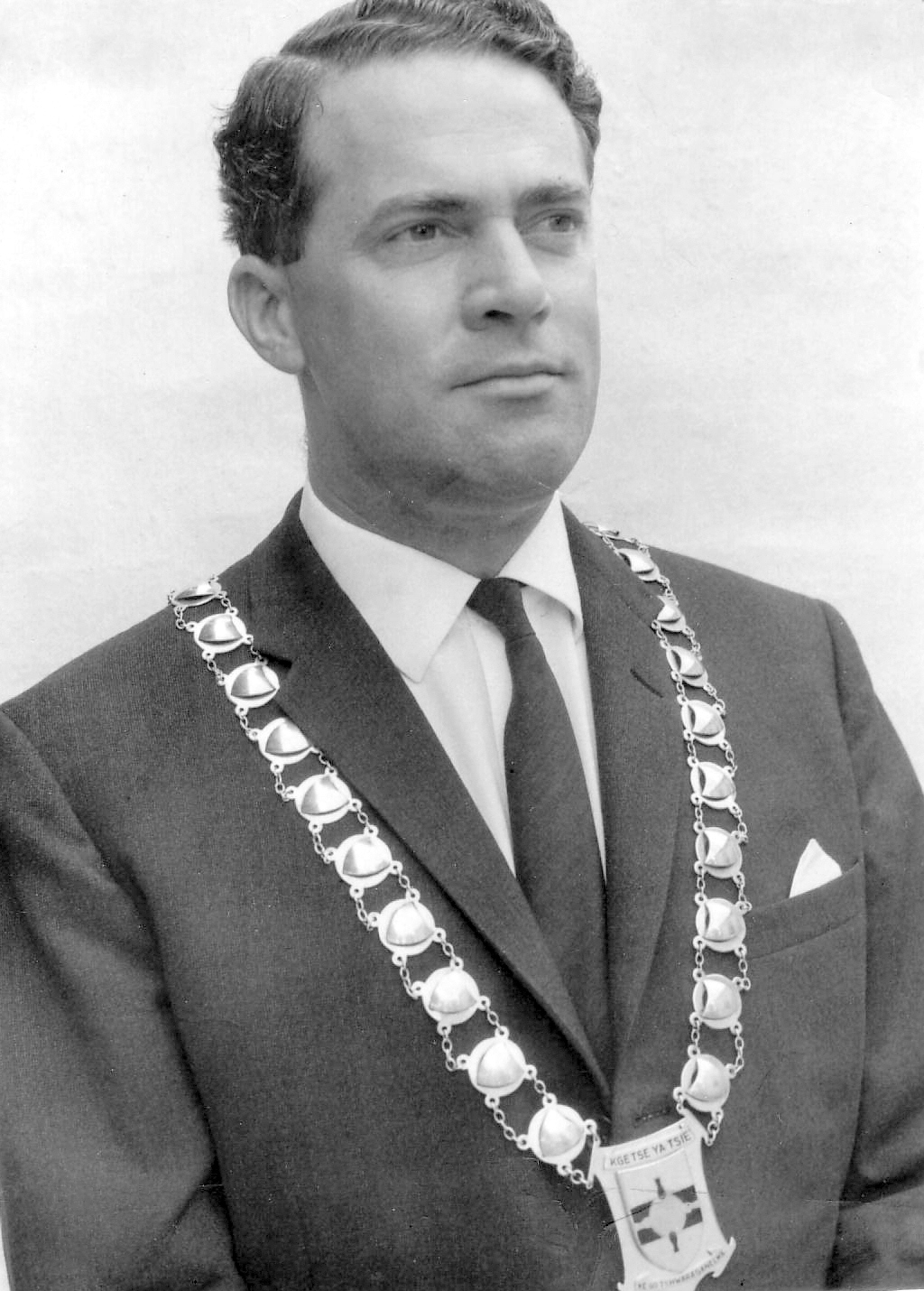

Mayor of Gaborone
- In office 1966–1968
- Preceded by: Office established
- Succeeded by: Grace Dambe

Member of the Gaborone City Council for South Ring
- In office 1965/66–1969

Personal details
- Born: 12 April 1927 Wallasey, England
- Died: 9 March 2013 (aged 86) England
- Spouse(s): Joan Ann Talbert (m. 1954–2002); her death
- Education: University of Oxford (MA); Mansfield College, Oxford (Dip.Th.)

Military service
- Branch/service: Royal Air Force
- Years of service: 2 years

John Derek Jones OBE (12 April 1927 – 9 March 2013) was an English Congregationalist missionary and politician in Botswana. A member of the Gaborone City Council, he served as the first Mayor of Gaborone from 1966 to 1968.

== Biography ==
Jones was born in 1927 in Wallasey, part of the Wirral in what was then part of Cheshire in the north-west of England. His father was a shipping clerk and later a departmental manager in the Liverpool office of the Cunard White Star Line. His mother was a housewife. He did his primary and secondary schooling in Wallasey. His entire family was Methodist and he attended a Methodist Sunday school.

He earned a master's degree at the University of Oxford, and then received his Diploma in Theology from Oxford's Mansfield College. He served in Egypt in the Royal Air Force for two years. After being ordained, he moved to the Bechuanaland Protectorate (now Botswana) in 1954 as a missionary of the London Missionary Society. He later served as the Secretary of the United Congregational Church of Southern Africa.

When Gaborone was built as the independent Botswana's new capital in the 1960s, it needed a government. Vice-President Quett Masire urged him to run for city council as a Botswana Democratic Party candidate, but Jones did not believe that would be appropriate for a clergyman. Instead, he agreed to run as an independent and was elected unopposed in the South Ring constituency. Soon after, he was chosen as the city's first mayor in 1966.

In 1968, he remained on the city council but stepped down as mayor, and was succeeded by Grace Dambe. He served his full term on the city council, but chose not to run for reelection in 1969. Soon after, he was awarded the OBE.

From 1972 to 1993, he managed the Botswana Book Centre. In 1982, the Botswana Book Centre left the ELDT and a Botswana-based trust was formed to hold the business. Jones continued as manager until retirement in 1993, after which he was still involved with some of the publishing. For some time he continued to serve as editor of the Botswana Society, producing its journal Botswana Notes and Records. His wife (since 1954), Joan Ann (née Talbert), originally Catholic, was awarded the MBE in 2000 for service to her community. She died in September 2002, aged 80.

John Derek Jones returned to England, where he died on 9 March 2013, aged 86.

== See also ==
- White people in Botswana
