= Thamsanqa Mnyele =

South African artist (1948–1985)

Thamsanqa (Thami) Mnyele (10 December 1948 – 14 June 1985) was a South African artist associated with the anti-apartheid politics of the African National Congress and the Black Consciousness Movement.

His artistic career took off in the 1970s when he produced works dealing with the emotional and human consequences of oppression. By the 1980s, his work followed the trajectory of the movement resisting apartheid, celebrating African strength and unity against the oppressors.

== Biography ==
Born in Alexandra, in Johannesburg, Mnyele was the third child of five. His father was a minister in the African Methodist Episcopal Church while his mother was a domestic worker. During the sixties, his parents sent him away from their crime-ridden town to a boarding school in a village northwest of Pretoria. During his time at school, he began to draw although there were no art classes. During his last year, he left the boarding school due to his mother no longer being able to afford it.

In 1972, he spent several months studying at the Swedish Lutheran art center, Rorke's Drift in Natal after receiving a grant. This is where he spent a year of formal art training, having to leave in order to help out his family and secure a job in Alexandra. Mnyele ended up working as an illustrator for the SACHED Trust.

In 1979, he moved to Gaborone, the capital of Botswana, where he joined the art troupe, Medu Art Ensemble, with his friend, poet Wally Serote. Beyond art, the ensemble published newsletters and held a famous conference in 1982 entitled "Culture and Resistance." While in Botswana, he joined the ANC military wing and studied guerrilla tactics at an ANC camp in Caxito, Angola. At ANC he worked with printers that made posters and stickers. During this time, he also made the draft logo of ANC's current design.

In June 1985, the exiles knew that South African forces were approaching, leading Mnyele to pack up his art portfolio in preparation. On 14 June 1985, South African commandos not only killed him but also took his art works. These pieces have yet to be recovered.

== Legacy ==
The Thami Mnyele Fine Arts awards is an awarded competition focusing on contemporary fine art.TMFAA focuses on finding artists in South Africa who have a passion for art in the same way he did. The competition awards range from a 3-month-long artist residency to R100,000.

== Artworks ==
Women Unite Against Apartheid, 1981. Offset lithograph in black on white wove paper. 42.2 × 30.2 cm (16 5/8 × 11 15/16 in.)

Art Towards Social Development, 1982. Lithograph in black and dark red on off-white coated paper. 86 × 61 cm (33 7/8 × 24 1/16 in.)

Unity, Democracy, and Courage, 1983. Screenprint in red and black on white wove paper. 61 × 43 cm (24 1/16 × 16 15/16 in.)
