= Gaborone City Council =

Governing body of the city of Gaborone, Botswana

Leadership
- Mayor: Oarabile Motlaleng, UDC since 2024
- Deputy Mayor: Mankie Sekete, UDC since 2024
- City Clerk: Lopang Pule

Structure
- Seats: 30
- Political groups: Botswana Democratic Party (27); Umbrella for Democratic Change (3)
- Committees: The Finance and general purposes committee; The Public health, Social Welfare and Housing Committee; The Self-Help Housing Agency (SHAA) management committee; The Town planning committee; The Trade licensing committee; The Education committee; The Motions committee

Elections
- Voting system: First-past-the-post
- Last election: 23 October 2019
- Next election: 30 October 2024

Motto
- Kgetsi ya tsie e kgonwa ke go tshwaraganelwa

Website
- Gaborone City Council

The Gaborone City Council is the governing body of the city of Gaborone, Botswana. In terms of generated revenue, it is the wealthiest council in Botswana. It is composed of 30 councillors representing the wards of Gaborone.

== Structure ==
The Townships Act mandates the structure of local governments in Botswana. Because Botswana is a unitary state, the power of the local councils are delegated from the national level. The Ministry of Local Government, Land and Housing has a major influence in terms of personnel hiring and training, budgeting, and development planning. Haskins Nkaigwa, mayor of Gaborone from 2011, has stressed the importance of more local autonomy. He advocates for a stronger city council with the power to determine budgets and hire and fire clerks and officers.

=== Administration ===
The city clerk runs the Gaborone City Council and is head of the Chief Officers Management Team (COMT). The city clerk has various advisory committees and secretaries to aid with the job; these helping positions include the deputy clerk, the secretariat, the head of the treasury, the Self-Help Housing Agency, and the departments of engineering, health, fire, education, social and community development, building and architecture, and an HIV/AIDS co-ordinator.

The Gaborone City Council is in charge of providing services like sewage management and street lighting to its citizens, but the council depends on parastatals like the Water Utilities Corporation and the Botswana Power Corporation to supply the water and electricity respectively. The GCC is also responsible for running public health clinics where the cost is less than one United States dollar. The city council runs all the public schools in Gaborone, providing free education and free meals to students.

=== Committees ===
The Gaborone City Council has seven committees:

- The Finance and general purposes committee
- The Public health, social welfare and housing committee
- The Self-Help Housing Agency (SHAA) management committee
- The Town planning committee
- The Trade licensing committee
- The Education committee
- The Motions committee

The mayor and deputy mayor head the finance committee, making it the most important committee. In all the committees, the mayor is also an ex officio member. The committees meet once a month.

=== Elections ===
Elections to elect the city councillors are held around the same time as national elections. The most recent one occurred in 2009. The elections are administered by the Gaborone District Independent Electoral Commission. The mayor of Gaborone is elected yearly by the 35 councillors in a first-past-the-post system. Candidates are limited the councillors themselves. Like the mayor, the members of the committees are elected yearly by the 35 councillors from among the councillors. Since the citizens of Gaborone do not elect the committee members or the mayor directly, they rarely know who the candidates are until after the mayor is selected. This has led to unaccountability on the mayors part towards the electorate.

=== Budget ===
An income tax called the Local Government Tax used to be the main source of income of the city council, but it was abolished. Sixty percent of the city's budget comes from national government grants. City councillors feel that because of recurrent obligations, they have little room to institute new solutions. Every quarter, the GCC prepares financial reports for the national government. The city council has a history of mishandling funds. In the third quarter of the 2011 fiscal year, the GCC withheld 6 million Botswana pula (US$756,000 as of June 2012) from private contractors. The funds were instead used to purchase trash compactors. The council has problems with collecting income as well; instead of receiving the forecasted P447,920 (US$56,500 as of June 2012) from parking fees, it only collected P3,300 (US$415 as of June 2012).

== Composition ==
Current number of councillors in Gaborone
Affiliation	Members
Botswana Democratic Party (BDP)	15
Botswana Movement for Democracy (BMD)	11
Botswana Congress Party (BCP)	8
Botswana National Front (BNF)	1
Total	35
Source: Mmegi

=== 2012 Mayoral election result ===
The 2012 election for mayor of Gaborone was contested when a councillor on the Gaborone City Council cut his ballot in half to vote twice. When counting the votes on 15 May 2012, Agnes Seragi, the Gaborone City Clerk and presiding officer over the elections, realised that there were 36 ballot papers, one more ballot paper than the total number of councillors. Councillor Moloko accused Councillor Kwapa of cutting his ballot in half and putting two votes into the ballot box. Councillor Taunyane supported the accusation, noting that one of the ballot papers is indeed cut in half. As a result, the count was voided, and a new election followed immediately where Councillor Haskins Nkaigwa became mayor and Councillor Florence Shagwa became deputy mayor.

Gaborone City Council mayoral election, 2012
Party	Candidate	Votes	%
Botswana Movement for Democracy	Haskins Nkaigwa	19	54.3
Botswana Democratic Party	Veronica Lesole	16	45.7
Source: Mmegi

Gaborone City Council deputy mayoral election, 2012
Party	Candidate	Votes	%
Botswana Congress Party	Florence Shagwa	19	54.3
Botswana Democratic Party	Rupert Hambira	15	42.9
spoilt		1	2.9
Source: Mmegi

== List of mayors ==
Image	Mayor	Years of office	Political party
	Derek Jones	1966–1968	Independent
	Grace Dambe	1968–1969	Botswana Democratic Party
	Wellie Seboni	1969–1974	Botswana Democratic Party
	Rosinah Mannathoko (first term)	1974–1976	Botswana Democratic Party
	Clement Oliphant	1977	Botswana Democratic Party
	Rosinah Mannathoko (second term)	1978	Botswana Democratic Party
	Pelotelele Tlhaodi	1979	Botswana Democratic Party
	Serara Ketlogetswe	1979–1984	Botswana Democratic Party
	Botshabelo Bagwasi	1984	Botswana National Front
	Paul Rantao	1984–1994	Botswana National Front
	Ginger Ernest	1994	Botswana National Front
	Nelson Ramaotwana	1999–2004	Botswana National Front
	Harry Mothei	2004–2009	Botswana National Front
	Veronica Lesole	2009–2011	Botswana Democratic Party
	Haskins Nkaigwa	2011–2019	Botswana Movement for Democracy
	Thata Father Maphongo	2019–2022	Botswana Democratic Party
	Austin Abraham	2022–2024	Botswana Democratic Party
	Oarabile Motlaleng	2024-	Umbrella for Democratic Change
Source: Botswana Guardian

== See also ==
- Gaborone
- History of Gaborone
