= Freedom Park (South Africa) =

Memorial park in Pretoria, South Africa

Coordinates: 25.7670°S 28.1888°E

Freedom Park is a park situated on Salvokop in Pretoria. It includes a memorial with a list of the names of those killed in the South African Wars, World War I, World War II as well as during the apartheid era.

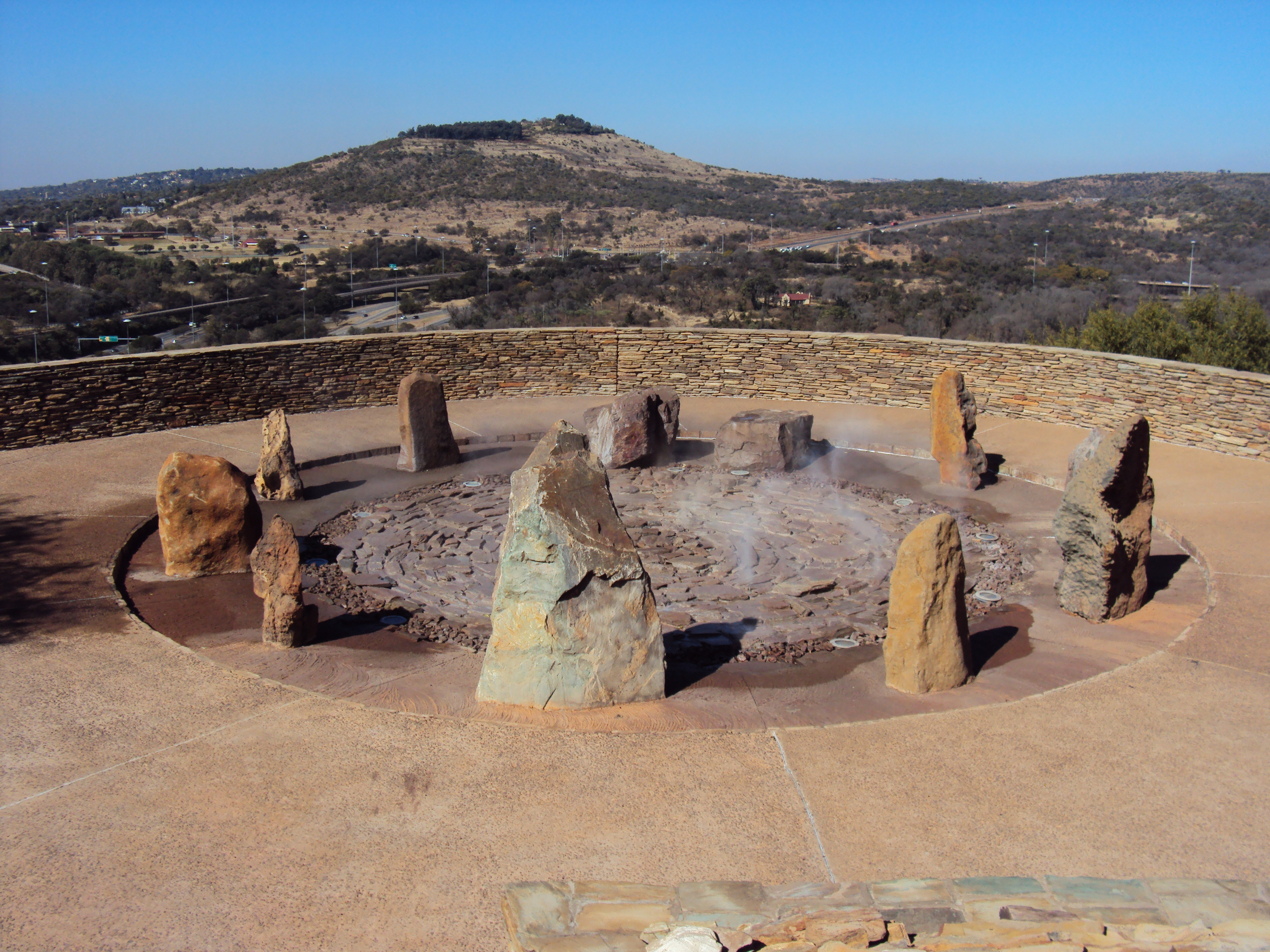
Isivivane - Freedom Park. Pretoria, South Africa

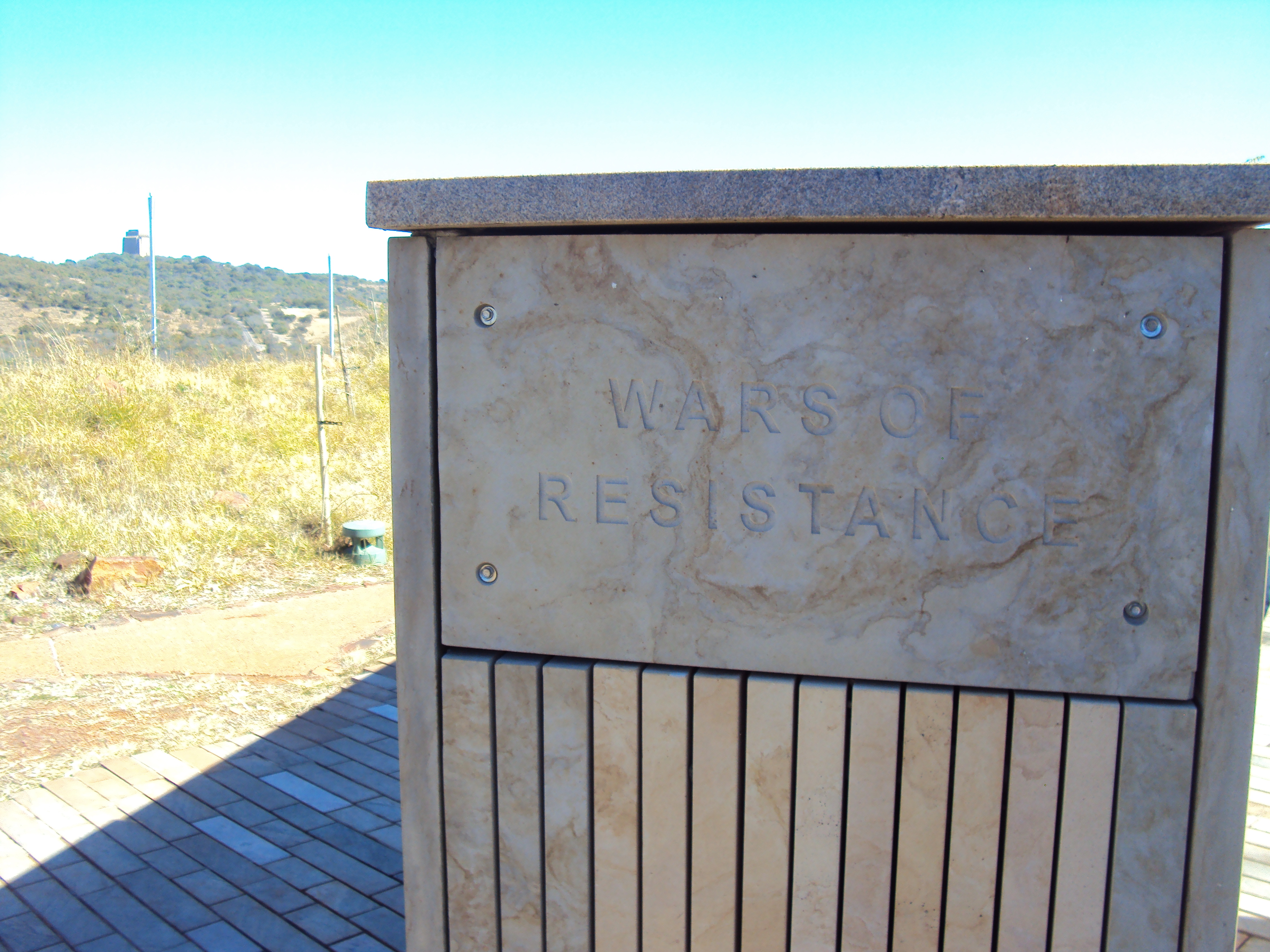
Memorial - Freedom Park

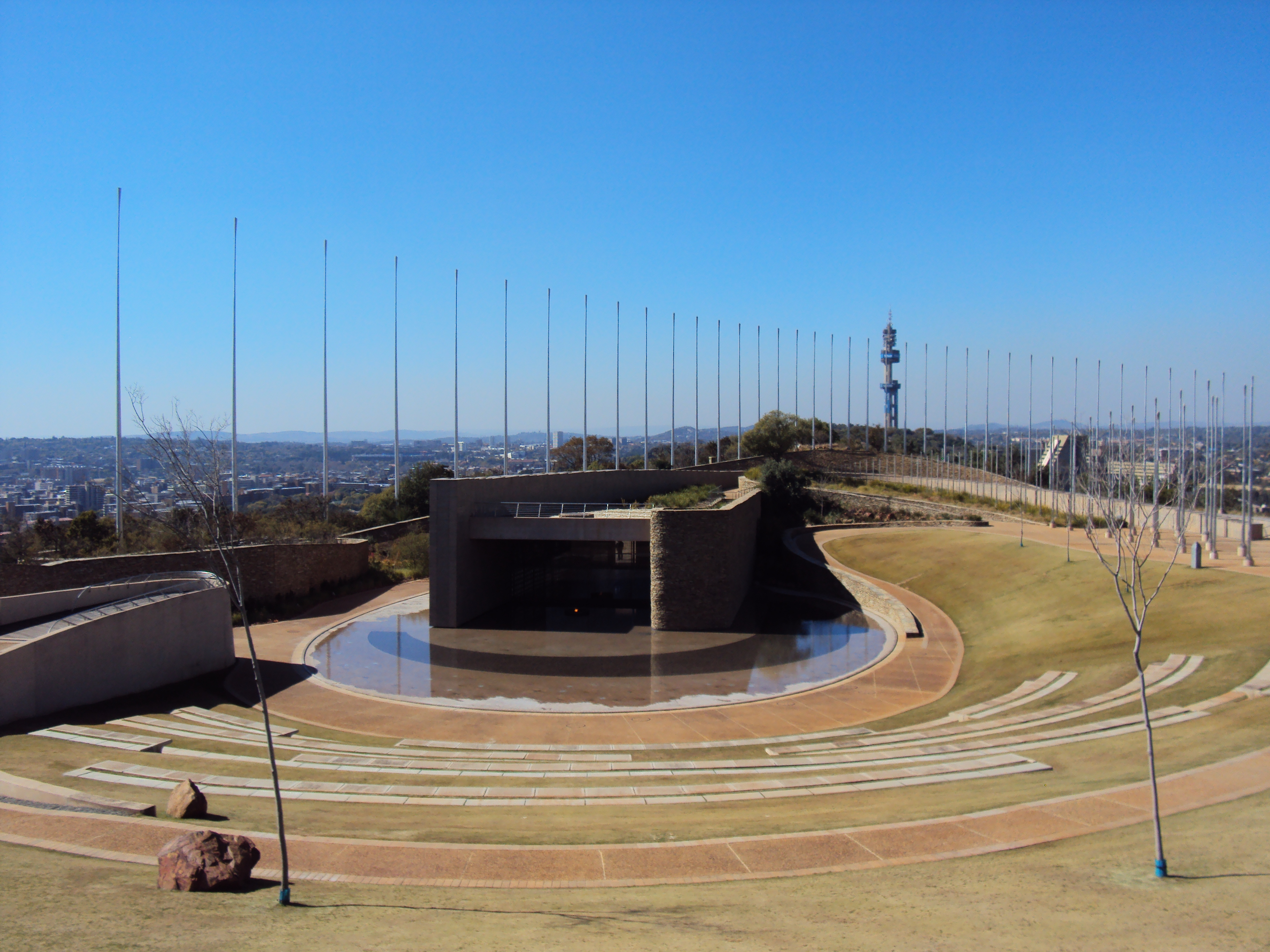
Amphitheatre - Freedom Park

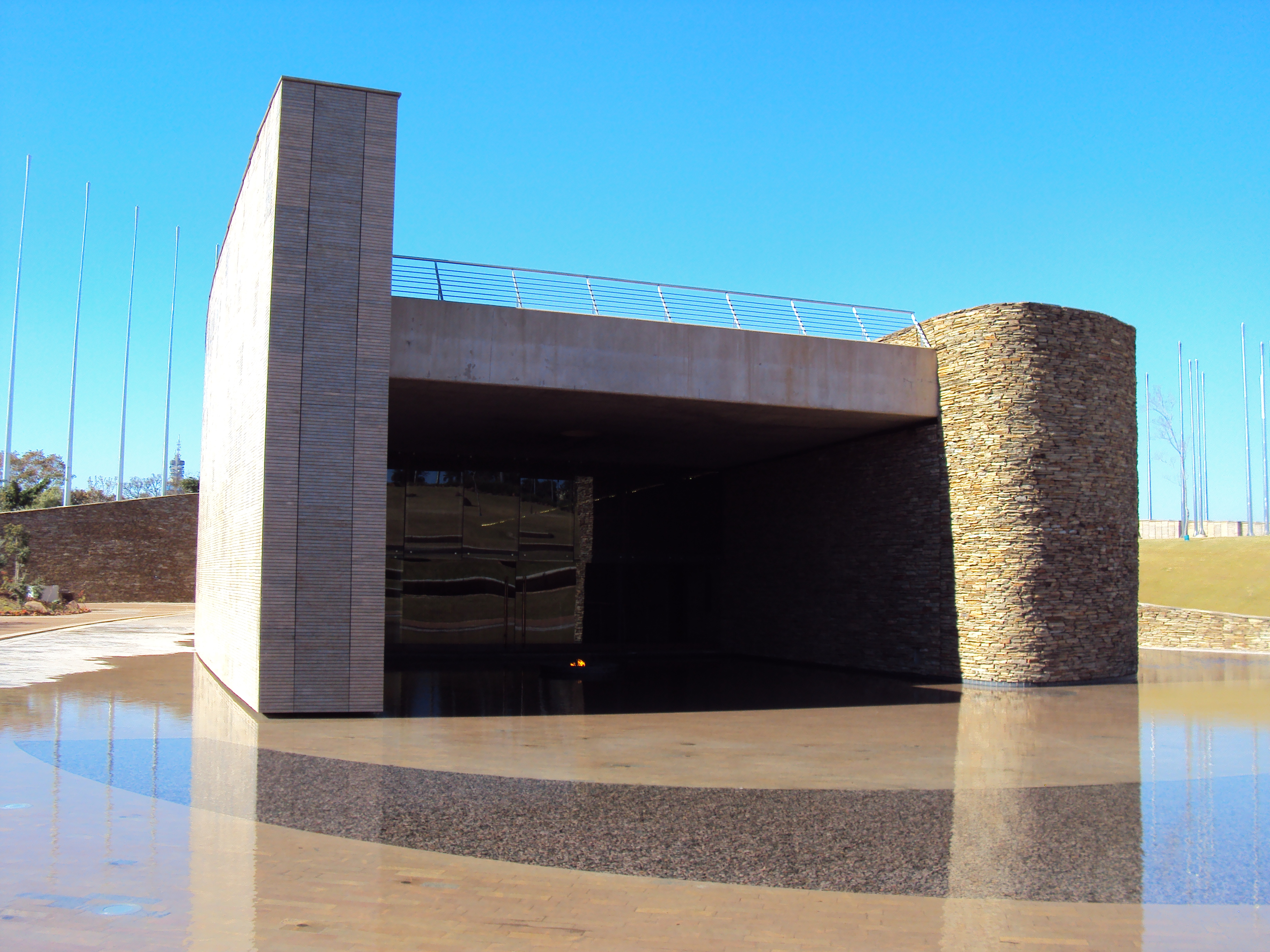
Eternal Flame - Freedom Park

In March 2009, twenty-four deceased liberation struggle heroes were proposed for inclusion on the memorial. Some of the national leaders chosen include Steve Biko, Oliver Tambo, Helen Joseph, Chris Hani, Albert Lutuli, and Bram Fischer. International and continental leaders were also among those considered for their contribution to the liberation of South Africa or the repressed in general. The continental leaders named include Mozambican President Samora Machel and Amílcar Cabral. Amongst the international heroes are Che Guevara, a revolutionary who fought alongside former Cuban President Fidel Castro, and Toussaint Louverture, who fought during Haiti's war for independence.

== Construction ==
Construction of the park occurred in various phases and was dealt with by Stefanutti Stocks, WBHO, Trencon, Concor and others.

The project was overseen in its totality by Mongane Wally Serote.

== See also ==
- Pretoria
