= Salim Essa =

South African businessman

Salim Aziz Essa (born 15 January 1978), is a South African known for his links to the Gupta family, alongside which he stands accused of state capture and various other forms of criminal and fraudulent activity.

Essa owns shares in several Gupta family companies and was the supposedly sole shareholder in VR Laser Asia, a company later revealed to have been controlled by the Gupta family. When South African banks withdrew services from the Gupta family and their companies, Essa and a partner attempted to acquire Habib Overseas Bank. This was interpreted as a mechanism to protect Gupta assets.

Essa started in business as a trader in his father's wholesalers.

In June 2017 Essa sold his controlling shareholding in Trillian Holdings, a company linked to the alleged looting of state-owned enterprises.

In November 2017 Eskom employee Suzanne Daniels testified before Parliament that Essa had facilitated meetings between her and a Gupta family member, and knew about executive suspensions at Eskom before they happened.

In June 2018 Essa launched a dramatic bid to keep engineering company VR Laser in business, offering a R70 million cash injection minutes before creditors were due to vote on its liquidation.
