= Raid on Gaborone =

1985 South African military operation

Raid on Gaborone (Operation Plecksy)
- Location: Gaborone, Botswana
- Date: 14 June 1985; 1:40 am (UTC+02:00)
- Target: South African dissidents in exile
- Deaths: 8 South African refugees, 2 Batswana, 1 Dutch national, and a six-year-old Mosotho boy
- Injuries: 1 South African soldier wounded
- Perpetrator: South African Defence Force
- Motive: to intimidate anti-apartheid activists and sympathizers

The Raid on Gaborone (referred to as "Operation Plecksy" by the then South African Defence Force) took place on 14 June 1985 when South African Defence Force troops, under the order of General Constand Viljoen, crossed into Botswana violating International Law and attacked South African émigrés living in exile in Gaborone. The raid, the fifth South African attack on a neighbouring country since 1981, killed 12 people including women and children; only five of the victims were actual members of the African National Congress (ANC), at the time the main opposition group against the National Party white supremacist minority regime.

== Background ==
In the 1980s, relations between Botswana and South Africa were strained. Anti-apartheid organisations such as the African National Congress used Botswana and other countries in Southern Africa as refuge. Despite Botswana's non-alignment policy, (Note: "...it remained Botswana's policy to accommodate South African refugees, while not allowing them to use the country as a base for attacks on South Africa.") the South African Defence Force as the military force of the apartheid government conducted several cross-border raids to attack South African anti-apartheid activists and émigrés in exile.

The South African National Intelligence Service, the Department of Foreign Affairs, the Department of Defence, and the police all favored a raid.

The following locations in the Gaborone area were targeted by the South African forces:

- Plot C, Tlokweng
- Plot A, Tlokweng
- 7819 Broadhurst
- 13212 Broadhurst
- 2914 Pudulugo Close
- Cycle Mart Building
- 15717 Broadhurst

== The attack ==
At about 1:40 am on 14 June, approximately 50 South African soldiers entered Botswana near the Tlokweng border outpost, not far from Bophuthatswana. Unconfirmed journalistic reports suggested that the party deployed from Zeerust. According to Manuel Olifant, a former policeman involved in the raid, the SADF readied around 50 tanks, helicopters, and fighter jets in Zeerust for use if Botswana retaliated, but they were not used. To lead the attack, the SADF employed former operatives of the Selous Scouts, a special regiment of the Rhodesian Security Forces. The South Africans drove nine miles to their targets in Gaborone in 18 vans with falsified Botswanan government license plates. To prevent retaliation from the BDF, the raiding party cut telephone lines to the local barracks and spread metal tacks on roads to flatten tires of pursuing vehicles.

The South African apartheid government forces completely destroyed four residences and severely damaged another four and seized documents, arms, and a computer. They did not engage BDF forces; they convinced the Botswanan security personnel they encountered during the raid to refrain from intervening. Once they had completed their objectives, the South Africans linked up and returned to South Africa, avoiding BDF roadblocks and establishing their own block at the border. South African officials claimed that a car with ANC guerrillas followed their party and opened fire on them, leading them to destroy the vehicle.

=== Casualties ===
The attackers killed 12 people and injured six. One South African soldier received minor injuries. Witnesses say that civilians were killed despite what SADF reports said at the time.

A list of the victims follows:

- George Phahle
- Lindi Phahle
- Joseph Malaza
- Basi Zondi
- Duke Machobane
- a six-year-old Mosotho boy not identified by name
- Ahmed Mohammed Geer, a Somali-born Dutch citizen (Note: Geer was alleged by South Africa to have relations with the Palestine Liberation Organization.)
- two Botswana women
- Mike Hamlyn, a South African student who was studying in Botswana
- Thamsanga Mnyele, a South African graphic artist and guerrilla
- Dick Mtsweni, a 71-year-old man employed by the ANC as a driver

== Aftermath ==
The raid was celebrated by the South African press. General Constand Viljoen held a press conference in which he stated that the raid was intended to destroy "the nerve center of the African National Congress operations against South Africa from Botswana," which South African officials believed was going to launch a campaign of attacks in conjunction with an ANC strategy meeting in Lusaka, Zambia scheduled for later in the month. He stated that the final decision to conduct the raid was made after two members of Parliament were killed in a grenade attack earlier in the week. Viljoen further stated that the soldiers used megaphones to urge the residents of Gaborone to hide in their houses while the raid occurred and that they "obtained good cooperation" from Batswana officials, who they asked not to interfere. South African Foreign Minister and acting Minister of Defence Pik Botha issued a statement, saying "Although it is committed to resolve its differences with its neighbors by peaceful means, South Africa will not hesitate to take whatever action may be appropriate for the defense of its own people and for the elimination of terrorist elements intent on sowing death and destruction in our country and our region."

The ANC declared that only five of the people killed in the attack were actually connected to its organisation. Within South Africa, the raid was criticized by Bishop Desmond Tutu, and the South African Council of Churches, and members of the Progressive Federal Party. The United States withdrew its ambassador from South Africa for consultations. The representative of the United Kingdom to the United Nations said that South Africa "in no way justified the violation of sovereignty and the killing or wounding of innocent people."

Major General Mompati Merafhe, the head of the BDF, called a press conference shortly after the raid to address rumours that the Botswana government was warned of the attack but took no action. He rejected these allegations and stated that the BDF had responded to the raid by establishing roadblocks between Gaborone and the border in an attempt to cutoff the South Africans' escape. He also stated that the BDF did not engage the raiding party in the city for fear of collateral damage. He also stated that the BDF did not have enough personnel to effective guard the large border with South Africa and that the army would review its strategies for dealing with raids.

Despite its failure to stop the raid, the BDF was largely spared criticism for its actions by Batswana officials, who instead focused their anger on South Africa. On 17 June 1985, the United Nations representative of Botswana sent a letter to the President of the United Nations Security Council asking for help to deal with the raid. The representative from South Africa sent a letter on the same day stating that Botswana had been warned about harbouring groups like the ANC, citing that "a State had a right to take appropriate steps to protect its own security and territorial integrity against such attacks." The Botswana Minister of Foreign Affairs said that the evidence of terrorist activities starting in Botswana was fabricated. South Africa responded that since Botswana did not sign the Nkomati Accord, a non-aggression pact with South Africa, the ANC was able to use Botswana as a base for its attacks. The Security Council unanimously passed Resolution 568, condemning the raid and requesting that South Africa pay reparations to Botswana. The UN dispatched a team to Botswana to calculate the damages caused by the attack, but South Africa never offered any compensation. Relations between the two countries further deteriorated after South Africa launched another cross-border attack in May 1986.

== Legacy ==
The Botswanan government later rebuilt one of the homes destroyed during the raid to serve as a memorial for those killed. A memorial, Freedom Park, was built in Pretoria to honour victims of apartheid atrocities, including the Raid on Gaborone . A dozen members of South African security forces involved in the raid later applied for amnesty to the Truth and Reconciliation Commission. Relatives and acquaintances of the victims opposed the amnesty applications.

== See also ==
- United Nations Security Council Resolution 568
- History of Gaborone
