= Mongane Wally Serote =

South African poet and cultural activist (born 1944)

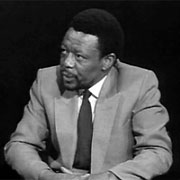
- Born: 8 May 1944 (age 82); Sophiatown, Johannesburg, South Africa
- Education: Morris Isaacson High School, Sacred Heart Commercial High School; Columbia University; University of the Witwatersrand
- Occupations: Poet and cultural activist
- Known for: National Poet Laureate, 2018
- Political party: African National Congress
- Awards: Order of Ikhamanga in Silver; Ingrid Jonker Poetry Prize
- Website: Foundation Website

Mongane Wally Serote (born 8 May 1944) is a South African poet and writer. He became involved in political resistance to the apartheid government by joining the African National Congress (ANC) and in 1969 was arrested and detained for several months without trial. He subsequently spent years in exile, working in Botswana, and later London, England, for the ANC in their Arts and Culture Department, before eventually returning to South Africa in 1990. He was inaugurated as South Africa's National Poet Laureate in 2018.

== Early years ==
Mongane Wally Serote was born in Sophiatown, Johannesburg, 1944, just four years before the National Party came to power in South Africa. His early education took place in the poverty-stricken township of Alexandra and later at Morris Isaacson High School – the school in Jabavu, Soweto, and Sacred Heart Commercial High School, Lesotho. He first became involved in the Black Consciousness Movement when he was finishing high school in Soweto. His presence in that town linked him to a group known as the "township" or "Soweto" poets, and his poems often expressed themes of political activism, the development of black identity, and violent images of revolt and resistance. He was arrested by the apartheid government under the Terrorism Act in June 1969 and spent nine months in solitary confinement, before being released without charge.

== 1970s–1990: Life in exile ==
Serote went to study in New York City, United States, obtaining a Fine Arts degree at Columbia University.

After contributing poems to various journals, in 1972 he published his first collection, Yakhal'Inkomo. It won the Ingrid Jonker Poetry Prize in 1973.

He was a Fulbright Scholar and received a fine arts degree from Columbia University in 1979. He was not able to return to South Africa and he began a life in exile, Serote remained in voluntary exile, going in 1977 to Botswana, where he rejoined the ANC underground and its military wing, uMkhonto we Sizwe (MK). He lived in Gaborone, where he was involved in the Medu Art Ensemble, and in London, England, where he relocated in 1986 and worked for the ANC's Department of Arts and Culture.

== Return to South Africa ==
He returned to South Africa in 1990, after the ANC was unbanned. In 1993, he won the Noma Award for Publishing in Africa. In 2004, he received the Pablo Neruda award from the Chilean government.

Serote held a variety of positions in the ANC, returning to South Africa in 1990, when he was appointed Head of the Department of Arts and Culture of the ANC in Johannesburg. He has also served as chair of the parliamentary select committee for arts and culture. Serote was awarded honorary doctorates from the universities of KwaZulu-Natal and Transkei. Until recently he was a Member of Parliament and Chairman of the Portfolio Committee for Arts, Culture, Language, Science and Technology.

He has served as chair of the parliamentary select committee for arts and culture, and was also the CEO of Freedom Park, a national heritage site in Pretoria opened in 2007. He has founded a few NGOs, iIKSSA Trust where he is the Chairperson, IARI of which he is also the CEO. He sits on a few advisory boards in the country dealing with Arts, Culture, Indigenous Knowledge and African Renaissance issues.

In 2018, Serote was announced as the National Poet Laureate of South Africa, following the death of Keorapetse Kgositsile.

== Awards ==
- 1973 - Ingrid Jonker Poetry Prize for the best debut collection in English
- 1993 - Third World Express wins the Noma Award for publishing in Africa
- 2003 - The English Academy of Southern Africa Medal for contribution to the English language
- 2004 - Pablo Neruda Medal for Writing
- 2007 - The Order of Ikhamanga in Silver, awarded for "Excellent contribution to literature, with emphasis on poetry and for putting his artistic talents at the service of democracy in South Africa"
- 2008 - Third World Express selected for Africa Book Centre's 100 Best Books of the Twentieth Century
- 2012 - Struga Night Awards: Poet Laureate of Macedonia

== Writings ==
Poetry

- City Johannesburg (1971)
- Alexandra (1972)
- Yakhal'inkomo (1972)
- Beerhall Queen (1972)
- For Don M- Banned (1973)
- A Sleeping Black Boy
- Tsetlo (1974)
- No Baby Must Weep (1975)
- Behold Mama, Flowers (1978)
- The Night Keeps Winking (1982)
- A Tough Tale (1987)
- No More Strangers (1989)
- Third World Express (1992)
- Come and Hope With Me (1994)
- Freedom Lament and Song (1997)
- History is the Home Address (2004)

Novels

- To Every Birth Its Blood (1981)
- Gods of Our Time (1999)
- Scatter the Ashes and Go (2002)
- Revelations (2011)
- Sikhahlel' u-OR (2019)

Essays

- On the Horizon (1990)

== See also ==
- Alexandra
- List of African writers
- List of South African poets
