= 12th Parliament of Botswana =

2019-2024 meeting of the Botswana National Assembly

←	11th	13th	→
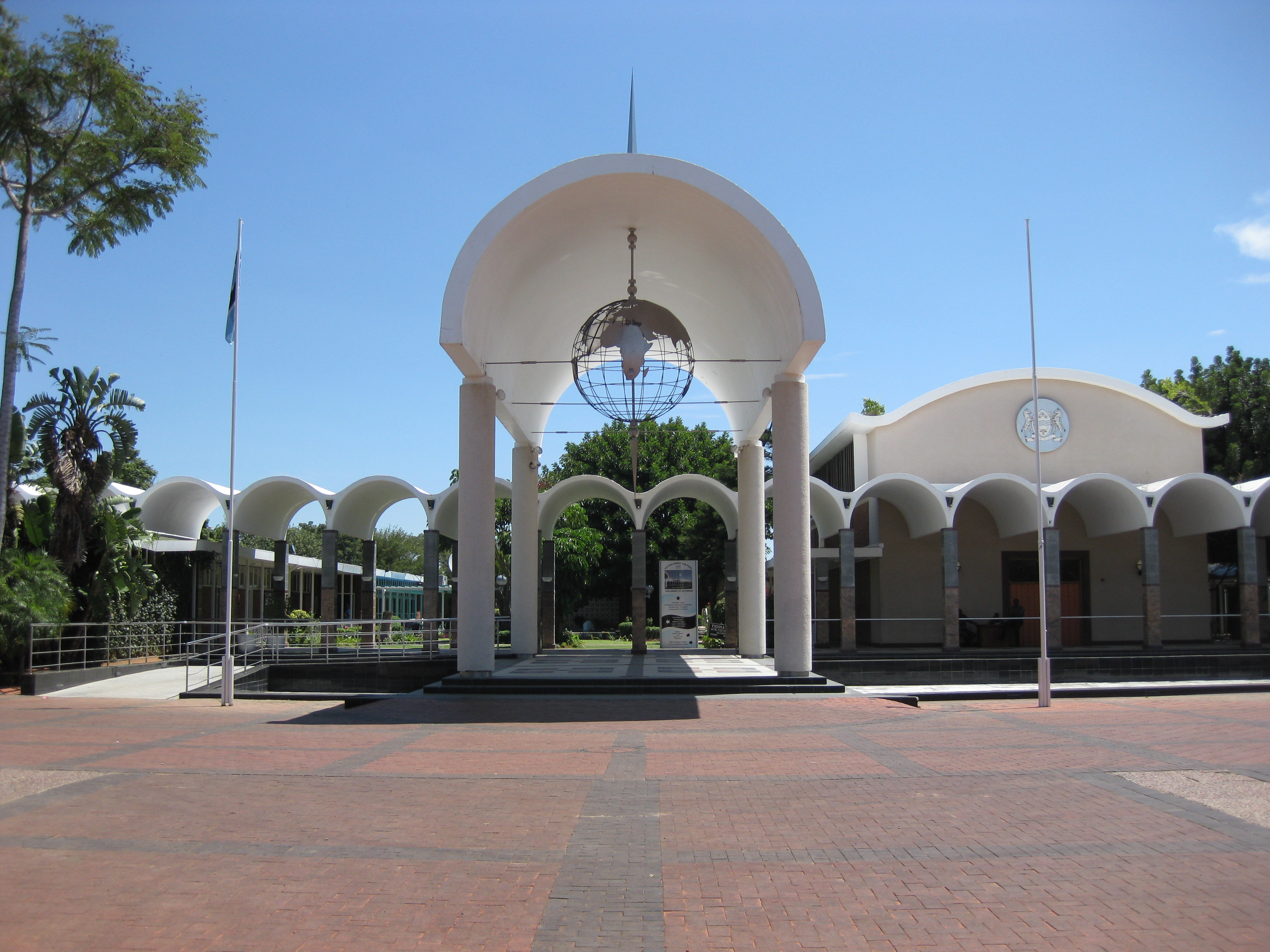

Overview
- Legislative body: National Assembly
- Meeting place: National Assembly Building, Gaborone
- Term: 5 November 2019 – 5 September 2024
- Election: 23 October 2019
- Government: Masisi II
- Opposition: UDC
- Website: parliament.gov.bw

National Assembly
- Members: 65
- Speaker: Phandu Skelemani (ex-officio)
- President of Botswana: Mokgweetsi Masisi (ex-officio)
- Leader of the Opposition: Dithapelo Keorapetse (UDC)

The 12th Parliament of Botswana was the meeting of the National Assembly, the unicameral legislature of the Parliament of Botswana, with the membership determined by the results of the general election held on 23 October 2019. The legislature convened for the first time on 5 November 2019 and was dissolved on the 5th of September 2024.

== Election ==
The 65 members of the National Assembly consist of 57 MPs elected in single-member constituencies elected by first-past-the-post, six members appointed by the governing party, and two ex-officio members being the President and Speaker.

The 2019 Botswana general election was held on 23 October 2019. It saw the Botswana Democratic Party (BDP) retain its legislative majority.

Party or alliance		Votes	%	Seats	+/–
Botswana Democratic Party		406,561	52.65	38	+1
Umbrella for Democratic; Change	Botswana National Front	148,122	19.18	4	–4
Umbrella for Democratic; Change	Botswana Congress Party	112,479	14.57	11	+8
Umbrella for Democratic; Change	Botswana People's Party	16,470	2.13	0	0
Umbrella for Democratic; Change	Total	277,071	35.88	15	–3
Botswana Patriotic Front		34,068	4.41	3	New
Alliance for Progressives		39,561	5.12	1	New
Botswana Movement for Democracy		2,058	0.27	0	–9
Real Alternative Party		145	0.02	0	New
Independents		12,694	1.64	0	0
Appointed and ex officio members				8	+2
Total		772,158	100.00	65	0
Valid votes		772,158	99.21		
Invalid/blank votes		6,185	0.79		
Total votes		778,343	100.00		
Registered voters/turnout		925,478	84.10		
Source: IEC

== Seat distribution ==
The table below lists the distribution of the 57 seats as they appeared after the 2019 election, along with the distribution at dissolution.

Name		Ideology	Political position	Leader	2019 result		Seats at dissolution
Name		Ideology	Political position	Leader	Percentage (%)	Seats	Seats at dissolution
BDP	Botswana Democratic Party	Paternalistic conservatism	Centre to centre-right	Mokgweetsi Masisi	52.65	38 / 57	37 / 57
UDC	Umbrella for Democratic Change	Social democracy Left-wing populism	Centre-left to left-wing	Duma Boko	35.88	15 / 57	7 / 57
BCP	Botswana Congress Party	Social democracy	Centre-left	Dumelang Saleshando	14.57 (Note: As part of the UDC alliance.)	11 / 57	7 / 57
BPF	Botswana Patriotic Front	Populism; Pro-Ian Khama	Big tent	Mephato Reatile	4.41	3 / 57	4 / 57
Vacancies							2 / 57

== Members ==
This is a list of the 57 elected members of the 12th Parliament of Botswana.

No.	Constituency	Name	Party	Majority	% of total votes
1	Chobe	Machana Shamukuni	BDP	1,375	58.8
2	Maun East	Goretetse Kekgonegile (Note: Originally elected as part of the UDC alliance but left in 2022, a year after the prohibition of floor crossings in 2021. This technicality requires MPs to resign their seats and run under their new party affiliation in a by-election for their preference to be legally reflected. He, and 6 other BCP MPs chose not to do this and thus remain as part of the UDC parliamentary group, de jure. The party affiliation presented here is his de facto party affiliation.)	BCP	627	52.1
3	Maun West	Dumelang Saleshando	BCP	3,304	58.2
4	Ngami	Caterpillar Hikuama	BCP	344	47.8
5	Okavango	Kenny Kapinga	BCP	761	51.1
6	Tati East	Douglas Letsholathebe	BDP	2,525	54.8
7	Tati West	Simon Moabi	BDP	1,453	49.0
8	Francistown East	Honest Buti Billy	BDP	2,019	57.6
9	Francistown South	Wynter Mmolotsi	UDC	576	37.9
10	Francistown West	Mokwaledi Ignatius Moswaane (Note: MP originally elected as BDP. For full details of changes during the current Parliament, see Floor crossings, resignations and expulsions.)	UDC	1,780	50.2
11	Nata-Gweta	Polson Majaga	BDP	1,568	50.6
12	Nkange	Never Tshabang	UDC	960	48.4
13	Shashe West	Fidelis Molao	BDP	1,270	50.3
14	Tonota	Pono Moatlhodi (Note: MP originally elected as UDC. For full details of changes during the current Parliament, see Floor crossings, resignations and expulsions.)	BDP	1,239	53.7
15	Bobonong	Taolo Lucas	BCP	853	49.2
16	Mmadinare	Molebatsi Molebatsi	BDP	2,867	50.0
17	Selebi-Phikwe East	Kgoborego Nkawana	BCP	1,046	51.1
18	Selebi-Phikwe West	Dithapelo Keorapetse	UDC	1,450	58.8
19	Lerala-Maunatlala	Setlhabelo Modukanele	BDP	1,139	43.9
20	Palapye	Onneetse Ramogapi	UDC	330	39.6
21	Sefhare-Ramokgonami	Kesitegile Gobotswang	BCP	3,779	62.1
22	Mahalapye East	Vacant (Note: Member resigned. For full details, see Floor crossings, resignations and expulsions.)			
23	Mahalapye West	David Tshere	UDC	2,091	51.8
24	Shoshong	Aubrey Lesaso	BDP	4,594	65.0
25	Serowe North	Baratiwa Mathoothe	BPF	1,038	42.7
26	Serowe West	Onalepelo Kedikilwe	BPF	1,667	66.9
27	Serowe South	Lesedi Leepetswe	BPF	380	37.8
28	Boteti East	Sethomo Lelatisitswe	BDP	1,276	40.0
29	Boteti West	Slumber Tsogwane	BDP	293	49.4
30	Mochudi East	Mabuse Pule	BDP	5,455	61.8
31	Mochudi West	Mmusi Kgafela	BDP	7,378	63.9
32	Gaborone Central	Tumisang Healy	BDP	1,801	48.2
33	Gaborone North	Mpho Balopi	BDP	5,738	60.2
34	Gaborone South	Vacant (Note: Member died in office. For full details, see Floor crossings, resignations and expulsions.)			
35	Gaborone Bonnington North	Anna Mokgethi	BDP	2,438	55.3
36	Gaborone Bonnington South	Christian Greef	BDP	1,142	43.7
37	Tlowkeng	Thulagano Segokgo	BDP	2,819	58.1
38	Ramotswa	Lefoko Moagi	BDP	7,112	63.4
39	Mogoditshane	Tumiso Rakgare	BDP	7,039	56.4
40	Gabane-Mmankgodi	Thomas Mmusi	BDP	7,264	63.5
41	Thamaga-Kumakwane	Palelo Motaosane	BDP	10,110	77.4
42	Molepolole North	Oabile Regoeng	BDP	6,838	67.6
43	Molepolole South	Kabo Morwaeng	BDP	7,495	70.9
44	Lentsweletau-Mmopane	Nnaniki Wilhemina Tebogo Makwinja	BDP	6,280	65.3
45	Letlhakeng-Lephephe	Liakat Kablay	BDP	1,895	48.3
46	Takatokwane	Friction Tshoganetso Leuwe	BDP	600	45.1
47	Lobatse	Thapelo Matsheka	BDP	4,467	61.9
48	Goodhope-Mabule	Eric Molale	BDP	3,909	60.1
49	Mmathethe-Molapowabojang	Edwin Dikoloti	BDP	6,719	67.3
50	Kanye North	Thapelo Letsholo	BDP	5,442	66.2
51	Kanye South	Lemogang Kwape	BDP	4,441	60.7
52	Moshupa-Manyana	Karabo Gare	BDP	11,432	84.8
53	Jwaneng-Mabutsane	Mephato Reatile	BPF	3,000	56.4
54	Kgalagadi North	Talita Monnakgotlha	BDP	462	52.2
55	Kgalagadi South	Sam Brooks	BDP	1,375	52.2
56	Ghanzi North	John Thiite	BDP	176	50.9
57	Ghanzi South	Motsamai Motsamai	UDC	461	48.9

== By-elections ==
Constituency	Date	Incumbent	Party	Winner	Party	Cause
Serowe West	8 July 2023	Tshekedi Khama	BPF	Onalepelo Kedikilwe	BPF	Triggered by the expulsion of Tshekedi Khama for missing at least two consecutive sessions of Parliament.

== Floor crossings, resignations, expulsions and deaths ==
The 12th Parliament has seen the following death, expulsion, resignation and floor crossings:

Name	Date	From	To	Constituency	Notes
Ignatius Moswaane	17 September 2020	BDP	UDC	Francistown West	Crossed the floor.
Mephato Reatile	10 December 2020	BDP	BPF	Jwaneng-Mabutsane	Crossed the floor.
Pono Moatlhodi	17 December 2020	UDC	BDP	Tonota	Crossed the floor.
Aubrey Lesaso	4 January 2021	UDC	BDP	Shoshong	Crossed the floor.
Tshekedi Khama	21 April 2023	UDC	Expelled	Serowe West	Expelled for missing at least two consecutive sessions of Parliament.
Unity Dow	16 May 2023	BDP	Independent	Specially-elected MP	Left the BDP ahead of a scheduled BDP disciplinary hearing.
Yandani Boko	7 March 2024	UDC	Resigned	Mahalapye East	Resigned.
Dumezweni Mthimkhulu	2 September 2024	BDP	Died in office	Gaborone South	Died in office
