= 2024 Botswana general election =

- 30 October 2024

61 of the 69 seats in the National Assembly (Note: Eight of the seats in the 69-member legislature are not directly elected by the voters. Out of these eight seats, six are 'specially-elected' members appointed by the president and approved by the National Assembly. The remaining two seats are occupied by the Speaker and the President as ex-officio members.) 31 seats needed for a majority
- Registered: 1,038,275
- Turnout: 81.42% (of registered voters)(▼2.64pp); 49.27% (of eligible population)(▲0.42pp) (Note: The total voting-age population was 1,715,656 in 2024.)
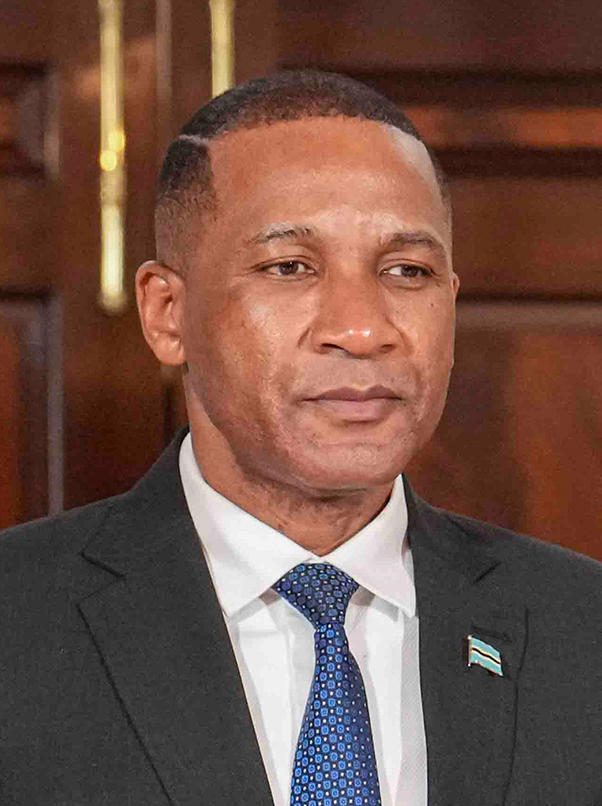

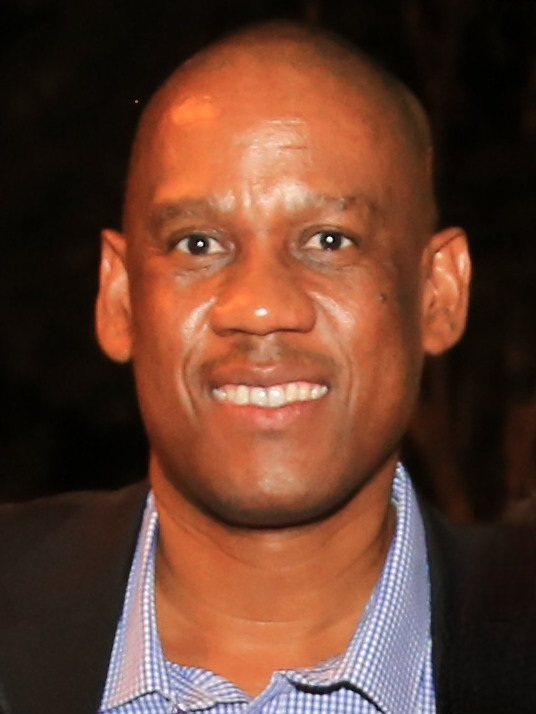

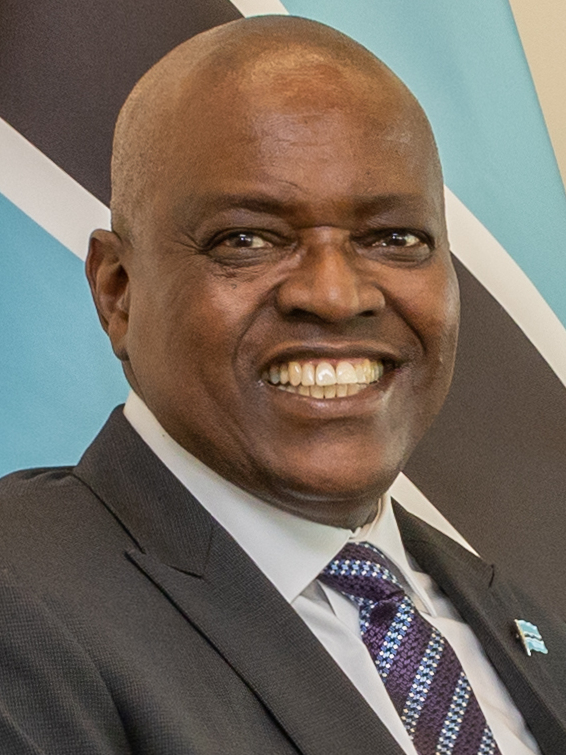
	First party	Second party
Leader	Duma Boko	Dumelang Saleshando
Party	UDC	BCP
Leader's seat	Did not stand	Maun North
Last election	35.88%, 15 seats	11 seats (Note: As part of the UDC alliance, the BCP won 11 seats and its candidates who stood under the UDC received approximately 14.57% of the national popular vote.)
Seats before	7 (Note: Following the prohibition of floor crossings in 2021, the UDC officially had 14 MPs at the dissolution of parliament. Seven of these were BCP MPs who had left the UDC alliance ahead of the 2024 election.)	7
Seats won	36	15
Seat change	▲29	▲8
Popular vote	310,869	175,972
Percentage	37.21%	21.06%
Swing	▲1.33pp	new
	Third party	Fourth party
Leader	Mephato Reatile	Mokgweetsi Masisi
Party	BPF	BDP
Leader's seat	Jwaneng-Mabutsane (defeated)	None (Note: Incumbent presidents are ineligible to contest National Assembly seats; instead, they serve as ex-officio members of Parliament.)
Last election	4.41%, 3 seats	52.65%, 38 seats
Seats before	4	38 (Note: Dumezweni Mthimkhulu, former MP for Gaborone South, died three days before the dissolution of parliament, so a by-election for the seat was never held. The seat figure presented here includes Mthimkhulu.)
Seats won	5	4
Seat change	▲1	▼34
Popular vote	68,978	254,583
Percentage	8.26%	30.47%
Swing	▲3.85pp	▼22.18pp
- Winning party shaded by vote share in each constituency
President before election
Mokgweetsi Masisi
BDP
Elected President
Duma Boko
UDC

General elections were held in Botswana on 30 October 2024 to determine the composition of the 13th Parliament of Botswana as well as local councils across the country. Up for election were 61 seats of the National Assembly as well as 609 local council seats, all elected through the first-past-the-post voting system.

The centre-right Botswana Democratic Party (BDP), which had dominated the country's politics since independence in 1966, was decisively beaten by the centre-left opposition Umbrella for Democratic Change (UDC). Large voter swings toward opposition parties led to the BDP dropping to fourth place in seat count.

The UDC took first place with 36 seats, a majority of five. This ensured Duma Boko, leader of both the UDC and its largest component, the Botswana National Front (BNF), would be elected as President of Botswana. The Botswana Congress Party (BCP) took second place, becoming the official opposition. The Botswana Patriotic Front (BPF) achieved significant growth in the Central District, increasing its number of seats. The BDP was reduced to a rump of four seats, losing nearly 90% of its parliamentary representation in one of the worst defeats suffered by a sitting government in a parliamentary election.

On the morning of 1 November, incumbent president Mokgweetsi Masisi conceded defeat and ensured a peaceful transfer of power. That afternoon Boko was sworn in by Chief Justice Terence Rannowane, forming the first government since independence with no BDP participation.

== Background ==
=== Previous election ===
The election held on 23 October 2019, saw the BDP maintain its parliamentary majority for the 12th consecutive time, securing 53% of the votes and 38 out of 57 seats, one more than in the 2014 election. The UDC garnered 36% of the votes and 15 seats, two fewer than its 2014 result. The election marked a significant political realignment in Botswana's political landscape. This was because the Central District (which had consistently supported the BDP, averaging around 75% of the vote since the first elections in 1965) saw large swings to the opposition due to former President Ian Khama's backing of the newly formed Botswana Patriotic Front (BPF) and of UDC candidates, where the BPF did not stand candidates of its own. The UDC and BPF won 11 out of 17 seats in the district, marking the first time ever that a party other than the BDP won a seat in the district. Nonetheless, the BDP made substantial gains in other regions, securing all seats in both Gaborone and districts in the southern parts of the country, offsetting the UDC's advances. The election outcome described as an upset was attributed to President Masisi's efforts to reconcile with segments of society previously at odds with Khama, such as labour unions, whose support had waned in the 2014 election. The rapprochement between the UDC leadership and Khama, who remains unpopular among urban and southern voters, led to a loss of support for the UDC among its traditional opposition base in the south.

While international observers deemed the elections "free and fair", Duma Boko contested the BDP's victory, alleging significant electoral irregularities. Despite the UDC's claims of multiple voting and bribery of election officials, their petition to invalidate the results was dismissed by the High Court in December 2019. Although the Court of Appeal agreed to hear the case in January 2020, it was later dismissed for lack of jurisdiction.

=== Background of opposition parties before the election ===
Following the 2019 elections, there were three opposing parties in the National Assembly—the Umbrella for Democratic Change (UDC), the Botswana Patriotic Front (BPF) and the Alliance for Progressives (AP). In August 2022, the BPF joined the UDC alliance, uniting all opposition parties in the National Assembly except for the AP.

The Botswana Congress Party (BCP), a major member of the UDC since 2017, had expressed interest in leaving the UDC alliance due to disagreements between BCP leader, Dumelang Saleshando and UDC leader, Duma Boko. Saleshando ceased to be the Leader of the Opposition in the National Assembly, after a group of UDC MPs joined by five BCP dissidents, voted him out of the position in July 2022.

The BCP proposed forming an electoral alliance with the AP and the newly-formed, Botswana Labour Party (a minor Botswana National Front splinter party). However, the AP withdrew from the coalition talks after disagreements with the BCP largely due to disagreements over constituency allocation, opting to join the UDC instead.

In May 2023, the BCP's central committee unanimously decided to participate in the 2024 elections separately from the UDC alliance. The party cited concerns over the UDC's disregard for intra-party democracy and the vulnerability of their party leader to capture by "private interests", as reasons for their exit.

Following a party leadership retreat in April 2024, the BPF decided to leave the UDC alliance, opting for a "pact model" which would see the BPF not standing candidates in constituencies it deemed unwinnable and the UDC doing the same in constituencies which the BPF can win in, instead of running under the UDC—a proposal since rejected by UDC leadership.

The election campaign also saw the return of former president Ian Khama, a critic of incumbent president Mokgweetsi Masisi, after three years of self-imposed exile in September 2024. Khama supported the BPF in the election.

=== Composition of parliament ===
The 12th Parliament was inaugurated on 5 November 2019. Dumelang Saleshando had replaced Duma Boko as Leader of the Opposition in the National Assembly following Boko's defeat at the general election.

Prior to the ban on floor crossings in 2021, the National Assembly saw two BDP MPs and two UDC MPs defect to the UDC and BDP, respectively. A by-election was triggered in the Serowe West constituency after Tshekedi Khama's expulsion from parliament after he fled to South Africa with his brother (and former President), Ian Khama, causing him to miss the minimum number of sessions required to maintain his seat. The 2023 Serowe West by-election was held in July 2023 and saw the BPF retain the seat at a larger majority. Yandani Boko, former UDC MP for Mahalapye East, resigned from the National Assembly in March 2024. A by-election was not held for his seat as it was deemed too close to the dissolution of parliament, expected by August.

== Electoral system ==
For the 2024 elections, the membership of the National Assembly consists of 61 MPs elected in single-member constituencies by first-past-the-post voting, six members appointed by the governing party and two ex-officio members (the President and the Speaker).

Voters are required to be citizens of Botswana and at least 18 years old and have been resident in the country for at least 12 months prior to voter registration. People who are declared insane, under a death sentence, convicted of an electoral offence or imprisoned for at least six months are not allowed to vote.

Candidates have to be citizens of Botswana, at least 18 years old, without an undischarged bankruptcy and be able to speak and read English sufficiently well to take part in parliamentary proceedings. They must also obtain a nomination from at least two voters in their constituency and the support of seven. A deposit is required, which is refunded if the candidate receives at least 5% of the vote in the constituency. Members of the Ntlo ya Dikgosi (House of Chiefs) cannot stand for election to the National Assembly.

The president is indirectly elected for a five-year term by the National Assembly. Since 1997, presidents are limited to a maximum of ten years in office, whether consecutive or not. The president's survival is dependent on whether their government has the support of a simple majority of the National Assembly MPs. They can be removed by a motion of no confidence, prompting their resignation or if not, the dissolution of parliament if the president refuses to do so.

During the general election campaign, all candidates for the National Assembly declare whom they endorse for President when they lodge their nomination papers. If a party or alliance secures an absolute majority of elected MPs in the legislative elections, its presidential candidate–always the party or alliance's leader–becomes president without the need for an investiture vote. In practice, since legislative elections are conducted through first-past-the-post voting, this has been the norm, with Botswana always having majority governments ever since independence in 1966.

In the event that no candidate secures a simple majority, the National Assembly elects the president through secret ballot, with a simple majority of the total number of MPs (excluding 'specially-elected' MPs) required to win. This election is limited to candidates who have the support of at least 10 MPs. If, after three rounds of voting, no candidate is elected, two additional rounds may be authorized by the speaker, if it is deemed that a successful election remains possible. Should these rounds also fail to produce a winner, or if the speaker declines to authorize further rounds, the National Assembly will be dissolved and new elections will be held.

=== Seat redistribution ===
In accordance with section 64(1) of the Constitution of Botswana, a Delimitation Commission was appointed on 13 May 2022 (following the release of the decennial 2022 Botswana Census) to redistribute the constituencies of the National Assembly. The National Assembly passed a bill increasing the number of constituencies by four seats from 57 to 61 seats. Consultations with the public and various interest groups ran from 20 June to 28 November 2022. The Commission presented its finalised report to the President on 10 February 2023.

==== New seats ====
1. Mogoditshane West
2. Maun North
3. Okavango West
4. Okavango East
5. Kgatleng Central

==== Eliminated seat ====
1. Mmathethe-Molapowabojang

== Election date and timeline ==
Unless a snap election is called, a general election is held every five years. The previous election was held on 23 October 2019. The president must issue writs for an election within sixty days of the expiration or dissolution of parliament. Under section 91 (3) of the constitution, parliament, "…unless sooner dissolved, shall continue for five years from the date of the first sitting of the National Assembly after any dissolution and shall then stand dissolved". If left to dissolve on its own, parliament would have done so on 5 November 2024. As a result, the latest possible date to hold the next election within constitutional limits would be on 4 January 2025.

However, due to longstanding convention, general elections are held in October and parliament is usually dissolved during the last week of August and rarely in the first week of September. Thus, on the 3 September, President Mokgweetsi Masisi announced that the writs for the 2024 election will be returned on 5 September 2024 and parliament will stand dissolved on the same day; as a result, the election to the 13th Parliament must have been held no later than 4 November 2024.

It was widely accepted by political commentators, news media and the Independent Electoral Commission that the next election would be held in October 2024. Indeed, in his announcement the president stated that Wednesday, 30 October 2024, will be the election date and that the day and the next will be public holidays in an effort to boost turnout. The 13th Parliament commenced on 7 November, within the 30-day constitutional window from the date of the general election. The general election progressed as follows:

=== Timetable ===
Key dates
Date	Event
3 September 2024 (Tuesday)	President Mokgweetsi Masisi announces that the general election will be held on 30 October.
5 September 2024 (Thursday)	Last sitting day of business in the 2019–2024 Parliament. Parliament prorogued.
5 September 2024 (Thursday)	The 12th Parliament is dissolved.
5 September 2024 (Thursday)	Writ day – President issues formal direction to the Independent Electoral Commission to hold the election. Official start of the campaign period.
28 September 2024 (Saturday)	Nominations for indirect presidential election candidates are held and close at 5:00 pm.
4 October 2024 (Friday)	Nominations for parliamentary and council candidates are held.
19 October 2024 (Saturday)	Advance voting (only for election and police officers who will be on duty on polling day) and overseas voting.
30 October 2024 (Wednesday)	Election day – Polling places across the country open 6:30 am to 7:00 pm.
30 October–2 November 2024 (Wednesday–Saturday)	Returning officers declare constituency results progressively.
1 November 2024 (Friday)	The Umbrella for Democratic Change wins its 31st seat ensuring it will form a majority government. Chief Justice declares Duma Boko elected as president; swears him in at 5:35 pm.

== Voter registration ==
Botswana uses a 'periodic list' voter registration system where the election authority creates a new list of eligible voters every five years before each election, as opposed to a continuous register or civil registry. This process occurs just before the election and involves aiming to register all voters within a relatively short time frame. It is 'self-initiated' in the sense that voters must go to the electoral authority's centres nationwide to register themselves rather than the election authority going to the people.

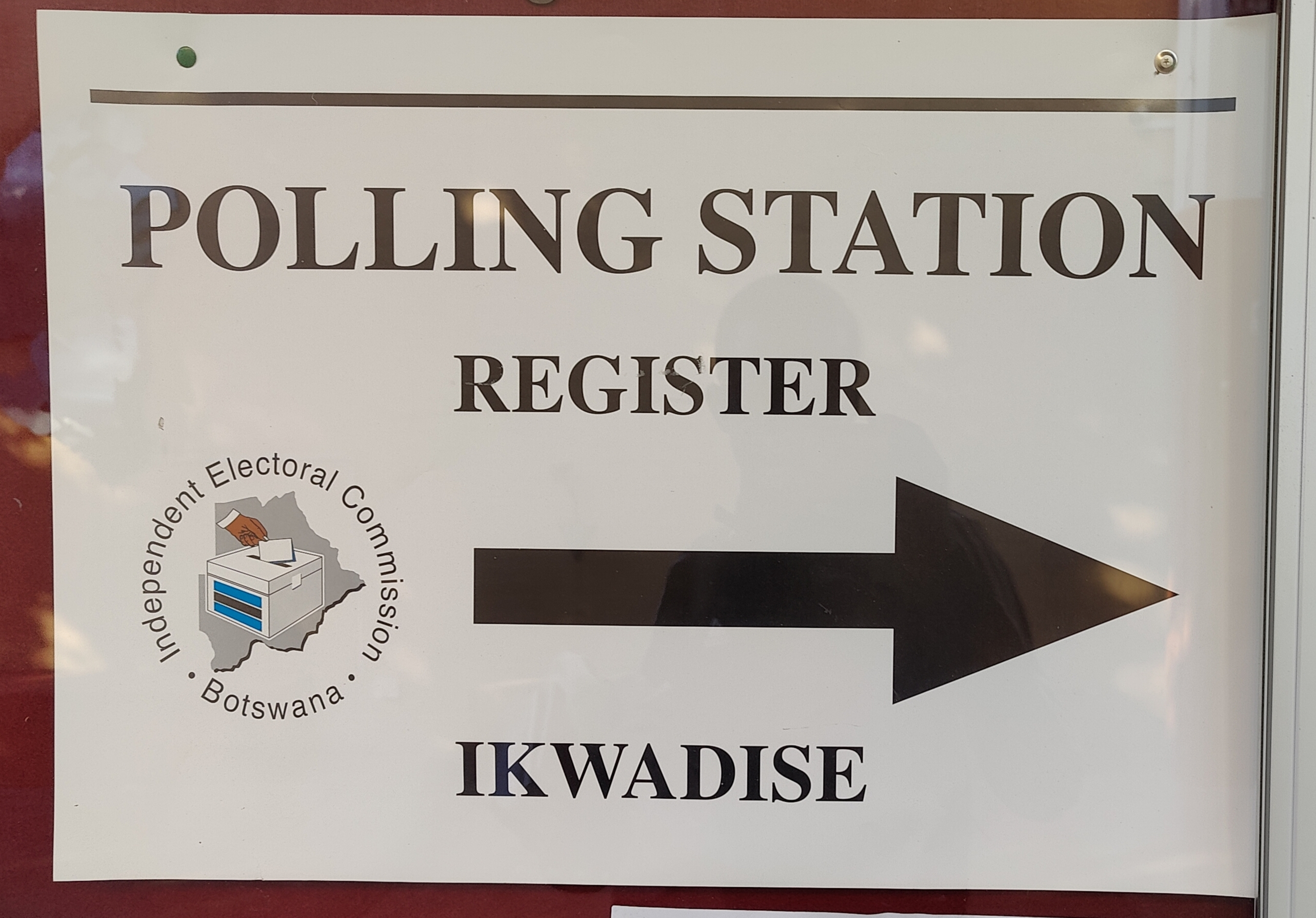
Voter registration poster at a polling station in Gaborone Central constituency.

The Independent Electoral Commission (IEC) oversaw the general voter registration, which began on 5 January 2024 and ended on 3 February. Approximately 2,800 polling stations were open daily from 8 a.m. to 6 p.m. on weekdays and 8 a.m. to 4 p.m. on weekends. All citizens aged 18 years and above were eligible to register to vote. The total number of people who registered during the general registration was 764,539. Following a lower-than-expected number of registered electors after the general registration, two supplementary voter registration periods were held. The first, from 26 February to 15 March, added an additional 74,404 registered electors. The second and final supplementary registration took place from 20 to 31 May and was conducted across approximately 2,808 nationwide polling stations, unlike the first, which was held at harder-to-reach district commissioners' offices and Kgotlas. This phase yielded an additional 197,021 registered electors.

=== Observation controversy ===
In the lead-up to the general voter registration, the UDC established the Madibelatlhopho (lit. 'Protectors of the vote'), a group of UDC supporters constituted ad hoc to oversee the voter registration process. Their aim was to prevent alleged rigging in favour of the BDP by the IEC. The voter registration period for the 2024 general elections in Botswana was initially scheduled to run from 1 to 30 November 2023. However, it was indefinitely postponed due to legal challenges from the UDC.

On 7 November, Justice Gaolapelwe Ketlogetswe of the Francistown High Court issued a rule nisi requiring the IEC and other parties to justify why the UDC's Madibelatlhopho should be restrained from monitoring the national registration process. This decision temporarily allowed UDC observers to proceed with their plan to observe the registration cycle until the court's final determination. The court order permitted UDC clerks to daily record the names, national identity card numbers and registration booklets' serial numbers of registrants. The IEC announced a further postponement of the registration period, shifting it to occur from 13 November to 8 December 2023, to prevent UDC observers from accessing polling stations until the Court of Appeal, the country's highest court, made its final ruling.

The apex court ruled in favour of the IEC, denying the UDC's request to have the Madibelatlhopho access to registration booklets and other confidential voter information. This decision overturned the previous Francistown High Court ruling that had allowed the UDC to monitor the voter registration process. However, the court found no legal basis in the Electoral Act to grant the UDC such monitoring rights. The Leader of the Opposition, Dithapelo Keorapetse, expressed disappointment with the judgment, viewing it as "a setback for democracy".

== Parties and candidates ==
This table shows the parties contesting the 2024 general election as well as the composition of the National Assembly at the 2019 general election and at its dissolution on 5 September 2024.

Name		Ideology	Political position	Leader	2019 result		Seats at dissolution
Name		Ideology	Political position	Leader	Percentage (%)	Seats	Seats at dissolution
BDP	Botswana Democratic Party	Paternalistic conservatism	Centre to centre-right	Mokgweetsi Masisi	52.65	38 / 57	37 / 57
UDC	Umbrella for Democratic Change	Social democracy Left-wing populism	Centre-left to left-wing	Duma Boko	35.88	15 / 57	7 / 57
BCP	Botswana Congress Party	Social democracy	Centre-left	Dumelang Saleshando	35.88	15 / 57	7 / 57
BPF	Botswana Patriotic Front	Populism; Pro-Ian Khama	Big tent	Mephato Reatile	4.41	3 / 57	4 / 57
BMD	Botswana Movement for Democracy	Right-wing populism Christian right	Right-wing	Thuso Tiego	0.27	0 / 57	0 / 57
BRP	Botswana Republican Party	Christian democracy Social conservatism	Centre-right to right-wing	Biggie Butale	did not exist		0 / 57
RAP	Real Alternative Party	Socialism; Revolutionary socialism	Left-wing to far-left	Gaontebale Mokgosi	0.02	0 / 57	0 / 57
Vacancies							2 / 57

=== Presidential nominees ===
In accordance with Section 7 of the Presidential Elections law, the Secretary of the Independent Election Commission appointed authenticating officers tasked with verifying the authenticity of documents submitted by presidential aspirants for the indirect presidential elections that occur as a form of an investiture vote after the general election of MPs. These officers were district commissioners, district officers and senior police officers. Acting as the returning officer for the presidential nomination process, the Chief Justice of the High Court received the nomination papers of the candidates on 28 September 2024, during two time slots: from 10 a.m. to 1 p.m. and from 2:30 to 5:00 p.m. The venue for this process was at the High Court headquarters in Gaborone. At the conclusion of this procedure, four political party leaders were duly declared as validly nominated candidates for the office of President, as shown below:

Name	Party
Duma Boko	Umbrella for Democratic Change (UDC)
Mokgweetsi Masisi	Botswana Democratic Party (BDP)
Mephato Reatile	Botswana Patriotic Front (BPF)
Dumelang Saleshando	Botswana Congress Party (BCP)

=== Number of constituencies contested by political parties ===
Party	Contested seats
Botswana Democratic Party (BDP)	61 / 61
Botswana Congress Party (BCP)	57 / 61
Umbrella for Democratic Change (UDC)	55 / 61
Botswana Patriotic Front (BPF)	45 / 61
Botswana Republican Party (BRP)	10 / 61
Botswana Movement for Democracy (BMD)	7 / 61
Real Alternative Party (RAP)	1 / 61
Source: Independent Electoral Commission

Note: There were 26 independent candidates.

=== MPs standing under a different political affiliation ===
Outgoing MP	2019 party	Constituency	2024 party
Aubrey Lesaso	UDC	Shoshong	BDP
Pono Moatlhodi	UDC	Tonota	BDP
Ignatius Moswaane	BDP	Francistown West	UDC
Mephato Reatile	BDP	Jwaneng-Mabutsane	BPF

=== MPs not standing for re-election ===
Name	Party	Constituency	Date announced
Mpho Balopi	BDP	Gaborone North	March 2022
Thapelo Matsheka	BDP	Lobatse	October 2023
Pono Moatlhodi	BDP	Tonota	August 2023
Eric Molale	BDP	Goodhope-Mabule	January 2024

=== MPs defeated in primary elections ===
Name	Party	Constituency
Sam Brooks	BDP	Kgalagadi South
Buti Billy	BDP	Francistown East
Tumisang Healy	BDP	Gaborone Central
Wilhelmina Makwinja	BDP	Lentsweletau-Mmopane
Lefoko Moagi	BDP	Ramotswa
Molebatsi Molebatsi	BDP	Mmadinare
Talita Monnakgotlha	BDP	Kgalagadi North
Oabile Regoeng	BDP	Molepolole North
Machana Shamukuni	BDP	Chobe

For further details of changes during the previous parliament see: 12th Parliament of Botswana § Floor crossings, resignations, expulsions and deaths.

== Campaign ==
=== Campaign context and economic issues ===
The formal campaign was considered shorter and more compressed than in previous election years, partly because several parties delayed their primary elections and manifesto launches until shortly before the election was called.

Economic issues were central to the campaign. Botswana had long relied on diamonds as the foundation of its export economy, but weaker diamond demand, falling state revenues, high unemployment and the challenge of diversifying beyond mining became major electoral issues. The election was shaped by deteriorating economic conditions and rising unemployment, particularly among young people, many of whom blamed the BDP government for failing to create jobs. In an Afrobarometer survey during the campaign, unemployment was identified as the most important issue facing the country by a larger share of respondents (59%) than any other problem. Dissatisfaction with the government's handling of job creation cut across age groups, with especially high levels of negative evaluation among voters aged 26 to 35.

The International Monetary Fund forecast growth of 1% for 2024, down from 5.5% in 2022 and 2.7% in 2023, while lower diamond revenues and expansionary spending widened the fiscal deficit. Concerns over public finances intensified after an Econsult review reported a sharp fall in the Government Investment Account, which includes the Pula Fund. The BDP dismissed the review as politically motivated, although finance minister Peggy Serame later acknowledged the decline in Parliament.

=== Botswana Democratic Party ===
==== Primary election disputes ====
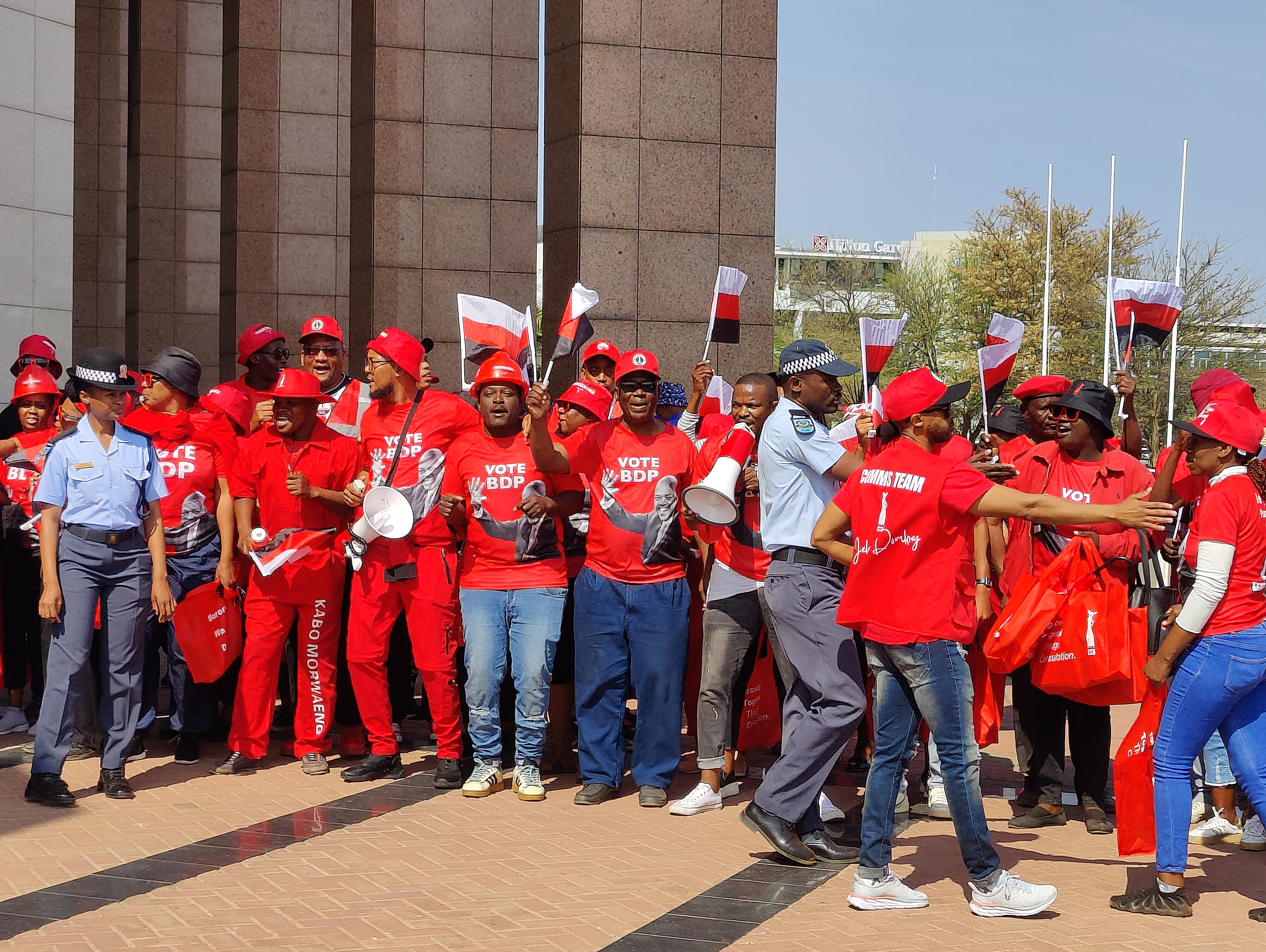
BDP supporters during the candidate nomination process.

The BDP's primary elections, known as bulela ditswe (lit. 'set them free'), were damaging for the BDP during the campaign not least because they were held unusually late. The party emerged from the process divided in a number of constituencies, with some defeated aspirants defecting to other parties, standing as independents, refusing to campaign for the party's nominees or actively "decampaigning" BDP candidates. The BDP held reconciliation events in some constituencies, but internal divisions probably cost BDP candidates votes in several races. The primaries were marked by complaints over delayed polling station openings, alleged voter-roll irregularities, ballot shortages and accusations of misconduct by losing candidates. The process was further disputed after the party introduced a stricter vetting system under which the BDP Central Committee approved or disqualified prospective candidates, prompting concerns that the party leadership could influence which candidates were allowed to contest.

One of the most contentious contests was in Goodhope-Mmathethe, where finance minister Peggy Serame challenged health minister Edwin Dikoloti. Serame, an indirectly elected MP who was at the time considered Masisi's preferred vice-presidential successor, needed to win an elected seat first to be eligible for appointment as vice-president. After Dikoloti defeated her in the primary by 57% to 43%, Serame appealed the result to the BDP Central Committee. The committee ordered a rerun and suspended Dikoloti over alleged irregularities, prompting him to leave the BDP and contest the seat successfully as an independent.

==== Manifesto and campaign message ====
The BDP campaigned under the theme of continuity and renewal. Its manifesto, titled Changing Together, Building Prosperity, emphasised the party's historical role in transforming Botswana from one of the world's poorest countries at independence into one of Africa's most stable and prosperous states, while acknowledging the need for economic change in response to new challenges. Masisi said at the manifesto launch that the party had "a plan for a future where everyone can prosper". The BDP promised an inclusive economy, stronger democratic institutions, improved living standards, and continued beneficiation from Botswana's mineral resources, particularly diamonds. Masisi highlighted his government's renegotiation of diamond agreements with De Beers, arguing that Botswana's share of diamond revenues would increase and could eventually rise further over the following decade.

Masisi sought to recover support the party had lost in the Central District, historically one of the BDP's strongest regions, but the party faced competition there from the Botswana Patriotic Front, which drew much of its support from Khama loyalists. Although the BDP publicly dismissed the credibility of polls and analyses suggesting that it could lose power, party spokesperson Banks Kentse acknowledged that the election would be the most difficult the party had faced.

==== Presidential benefits and constitutional review ====
In the months before the election, the government proposed amendments to presidential retirement benefits which would have expanded benefits for former presidents and their families. The amendment to the Presidents (Pensions and Retirement Benefits) Act would have entitled the spouse, children and dependants of a deceased President to a tax-free monthly payment of 55,000 pula (US$4,100), around half of the President's salary. The amendment was intended to ensure that a President's family would continue receiving retirement benefits after the President's death. It also provided that the biological, adopted and out-of-wedlock children of the president and vice-president would receive tax-exempt benefits until the age of 18. The amendment further proposed expanding the benefits available to former Presidents, including increasing the number of official vehicles from three to six, providing security personnel, a secretary, an office attendant, domestic staff and a fully furnished residence in Gaborone. It also included other privileges, such as first-class international travel. The proposals were rejected by opposition parties, civil society groups, labour organisations, academics, the media, youth groups and women's groups. In a primetime announcement on the national broadcaster, Kabo Morwaeng, the Minister for State President who had tabled the bill, said the government had listened to the public after demonstrations and had decided to withdraw the bill.

The government's constitutional review process also became a campaign issue. A presidential commission appointed in 2022 held nationwide public consultations, but critics argued that it rejected major public recommendations, including direct presidential elections, broader reform of the Bill of Rights and limits on executive influence over judicial appointments. The government later introduced a Constitutional (Amendment) Bill, which opponents said diverged from the consultation process and would instead expand presidential power, including by increasing the number of specially elected MPs from six to ten, criticised as a way a government can undemocratically increase its majority after a general election. Civil society groups campaigned against the bill and called for its withdrawal. On 4 September 2024, a day before Parliament was dissolved, opposition MPs boycotted the vote while protesters gathered outside Parliament. The bill failed to reach the required two-thirds majority, receiving 37 votes in favour, one against and two abstentions, with 22 MPs not voting.

=== Umbrella for Democratic Change ===
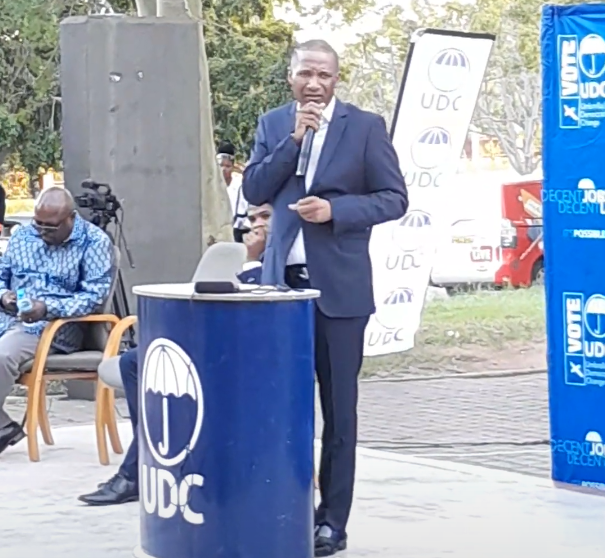
Duma Boko during a campaign rally at the University of Botswana.

The Umbrella for Democratic Change (UDC), led by Duma Boko, ran a confrontational campaign focused on removing the BDP from power and presenting the election as a decisive opportunity for political change. The coalition launched its manifesto on 10 August at the Royal Aria Stadium in Gaborone. Boko accused the BDP government of corruption, enrichment of political elites and abuse of power, and argued that public anger should be channelled through the ballot box in order to build what he called a "Second Republic".

The UDC manifesto proposed reforms in education, housing, healthcare, economic development, environmental sustainability and governance. Economically, the coalition promised to create between 450,000 and 500,000 jobs through investment in infrastructure, agriculture, diamond trading and transport, with the aim of turning Botswana into a regional logistics hub. It also promised subsidies and dedicated funds for small businesses, the construction of 100,000 affordable homes over five years, a monthly minimum wage increase from 1,500 pula (US$112) to 4,000 pula (US$300), and comprehensive health insurance for citizens. The coalition also proposed investment in 5G, artificial intelligence and smart-city infrastructure, as well as a green economy programme based on renewable energy, climate-resilient infrastructure and green jobs. Institutionally, the UDC promised constitutional reforms, including the introduction of proportional representation for general elections and measures to strengthen judicial independence.

The UDC also campaigned on election transparency and institutional reform. Boko and other opposition figures accused key institutions, including the judiciary, the Directorate of Intelligence and Security and the Independent Electoral Commission, of lacking independence or acting in ways that favoured the incumbent party. The coalition encouraged citizens to take part in election monitoring and linked political change to the need to end what it portrayed as national stagnation under the BDP. However, the UDC also had to overcome the effects of opposition fragmentation after the departure of the Botswana Congress Party (BCP) and the failure to maintain an electoral arrangement with the BPF. Its campaign therefore repeatedly presented the coalition as the only opposition force with sufficient national reach to defeat the BDP.

=== Botswana Congress Party ===
The BCP, led by Dumelang Saleshando, campaigned separately from the UDC after withdrawing from the coalition. Its campaign focused on social justice, economic inclusion and criticism of the BDP government's failure to meet the needs of vulnerable groups, particularly young people and women, whom the party described as its natural allies. The party campaigned under the slogans "Save Botswana" and "A Better Tomorrow Awaits". Its manifesto was structured around seven development pillars: a high-wage and climate-responsible economy, equitable access to land and housing, advanced education aligned with the Fourth Industrial Revolution, accessible universal healthcare, efficient social protection, democratic governance and inclusive development.

The BCP promised 300,000 jobs, a minimum living wage of 4,000 pula per month by 2029, the achievement of full employment, the reduction of extreme poverty and stronger protection for workers' rights. It also proposed the recovery of displaced jobs, greater value from tourism, free education from pre-school to secondary level, regulation of school fees and a more inclusive development policy for youth, children and women. Saleshando accused Masisi's government of making promises it did not believe in and argued that voters had already seen the BDP "for what it was". The BCP also clashed with the UDC during the campaign. Saleshando accused Boko and the UDC of trying to discredit the BCP because it threatened the UDC's position as the main opposition force, while Boko accused Saleshando of mismanaging party finances.

=== Botswana Patriotic Front ===
The BPF, chaired by Mephato Reatile but strongly associated with Khama, campaigned primarily on removing Masisi from power and consolidating its support in the Central District. Khama had returned to Botswana in September 2024 after a period of self-imposed exile in South Africa, where he had lived while facing charges in Botswana including illegal firearms possession, money laundering and receiving stolen property. His return allowed him to campaign more actively for the BPF and against Masisi, his former vice-president and successor turned political rival.

The BPF's manifesto, launched on 6 October in Serowe, emphasised anti-corruption measures, governance reform, land reform, industrial development, poverty eradication and infrastructure improvement. The party also proposed revitalising the kgotla system as a means of strengthening citizen participation and cultural heritage. Khama's return was seen as helping to mobilise loyalists of the former president, particularly in Serowe and the wider Central District, although the BPF campaign was constrained by its late start, its split with the UDC and the breakaway of Biggie Butale's Botswana Republican Party (BRP).

=== Minor parties ===
Smaller parties also contested the election. The Botswana Movement for Democracy (BMD), led by Christian pastor Thuso Tiego, contested seven constituencies and campaigned on family values, public health, public safety, land ownership and what it described as radical socioeconomic transformation. Under Tiego, the party adopted a socially conservative profile and strongly criticised LGBT rights. Although Tiego had previously rejected alliances, during the campaign he said the BMD would cooperate with other opposition parties and would support BCP candidates in the north, UDC candidates in the south and BPF candidates in Serowe where the BMD had no candidate.

The BRP, formed by Butale after a split from the BPF, fielded ten candidates, all in the Central District. Its manifesto, launched in Serowe on 19 October under the title The Manifesto That Leaves No Stone Unturned, was published in English, Setswana and Ikalanga. The party promoted solar energy, arts, culture and tourism as routes to economic diversification, and proposed the construction of a third major city, alongside Gaborone and Francistown, as a job-creation measure. The minor Real Alternative Party campaigned as a socialist and environmental justice party, focusing on pollution, mining-affected communities, economic inequality, housing, precarious work and corruption.

=== Youth mobilisation and social media ===
Youth mobilisation, particularly through social media and campaign volunteering, became a prominent feature of the election. The election challenged earlier assumptions that young Batswana were unlikely to participate in electoral politics, finding that younger and first-time voters, including members of Gen Z, helped shape the result through their response to the UDC's message and broader dissatisfaction with unemployment, corruption and economic hardship. The New York Times linked the BDP's defeat to generational discontent, noting that youth unemployment stood at 38%, far above the national rate and that young people bore a disproportionate share of inequality and poverty. Young people played a central role in Boko's campaign by mobilising voters, while UDC figures argued that his appeal among younger voters was evident in the party's campaign presence across the country. Some academics have noted that young people used social media to share pictures of national identity and voter registration cards, encourage others to vote, discuss voting queues and procedures, and warn against opposition vote-splitting. They also cited reports that unemployed graduates and tertiary students were prominent in polling-station queues, with many using the slogan a re tlhopheng sentle ("let us vote wisely"). Although social media had been used in previous Botswana elections, the 2024 campaign saw it become a particularly important platform for political mobilisation, the circulation of allegations of corruption and mismanagement, and the organisation of voters around the prospect of a change of government.

== Opinion polls ==
Polling firm	Fieldwork date	Sample size	BDP	UDC	BCP	BPF	BMD	Others	Undecided	Lead
2024 general election	30 Oct 2024	–	30.5	37.2	21.0	8.3	0.1	2.9	–	6.7
Afrobarometer	6–19 Jul 2024	1,200	33.2	24.8 (Note: "UDC" only–20.9% BNF–3.1% AP–0.6% BPP–0.2%)	11.0	1.7	0.2	1.3	27.7 (Note: Would not vote–7.3% Refused to answer–9.7% Don't know–10.7%)	8.4
Afrobarometer	23 Jul–10 Aug 2022	1,200	22.3	37.5 (Note: "UDC" only–29.4% BNF–5.1% AP–2.9% BPP–0.1%)	7.9	3.4	0.1	1.2 (Note: RAP–0.1% All others–0.8%)	27.8 (Note: Would not vote–14.6% Refused to answer–7.4% Don't know–5.8%)	15.2
2019 general election	23 Oct 2019	–	52.7	35.9		4.4	0.3	6.7	–	16.8

== Results ==
The election resulted in a historic defeat for the Botswana Democratic Party, which lost power for the first time since independence. The Umbrella for Democratic Change won an outright majority with 36 of the 61 elected seats, while the BDP was reduced to a rump of four seats, becoming the smallest party in the National Assembly.

The BDP nevertheless finished second in the national popular vote. Its support, however, was widely dispersed across the country and translated poorly into seats under the first-past-the-post system. The Botswana Congress Party became the second largest party by seats despite receiving fewer votes than the BDP nationally through a concentrated northern vote base translating their votes to seats efficiently. The Botswana Patriotic Front also won more seats than the BDP as its support is concentrated heavily in the Central District. The result therefore produced a major electoral inversion, with the BDP heavily under-represented relative to its vote share. Edwin Dikoloti was elected as MP for Goodhope-Mmathethe as an independent candidate, the second time in history after the 2009 general election in the Lobatse constituency.

Botswana general election results (30 October 2024)
↓
36	15	5	4	1
UDC	BCP	BPF	BDP	Ind.

Party or alliance		Votes	%	Seats	+/–
Umbrella for Democratic; Change	Botswana National Front	193,173	23.12	23	+19
Umbrella for Democratic; Change	Alliance for Progressives	46,799	5.60	6	+5
Umbrella for Democratic; Change	Independents	39,261	4.70	3	+3
Umbrella for Democratic; Change	Botswana People's Party	31,636	3.79	4	+4
Umbrella for Democratic; Change	Total	310,869	37.21	36	+21
Botswana Democratic Party		254,583	30.47	4	−34
Botswana Congress Party		175,972	21.06	15	New
Botswana Patriotic Front		68,978	8.26	5	+2
Botswana Republican Party		4,152	0.50	0	New
Botswana Movement for Democracy		1,146	0.14	0	0
Real Alternative Party		23	0.00	0	0
Independents		19,690	2.36	1	+1
Appointed and ex officio members				8	0
Total		835,413	100.00	69	+4
Valid votes		835,413	98.83		
Invalid/blank votes		9,905	1.17		
Total votes		845,318	100.00		
Registered voters/turnout		1,038,275	81.42		
Source: Independent Electoral Commission

Popular vote (%)
UDC	37.21%
BDP	30.47%
BCP	21.06%
BPF	8.26%
Independents	2.36%
Others	0.64%

Parliament seats (%)
UDC	59.02%
BCP	24.59%
BPF	8.20%
BDP	6.56%
Independents	1.64%

=== Results by district and city ===
Proportion of seats and votes won in each district and city, by party
District	UDC	BDP	BCP	BPF	Other
Central	9 / 17	0 / 17	3 / 17	5 / 17	0 / 17
Central	31.5% 79,515	24.1% 60,927	21.4% 54,098	20.2% 51,121	2.7% 6,894
Kweneng	8 / 10	2 / 10	0 / 10	0 / 10	0 / 10
Kweneng	46.9% 61,742	36.0% 47,363	11.8% 15,564	4.3% 5,666	1.0% 1,254
Southern	3 / 5	1 / 5	0 / 5	0 / 5	1 / 5
Southern	39.7% 41,035	39.9% 41,281	5.7% 5,919	2.8% 2,847	11.9% 12,294
Gaborone	5 / 5	0 / 5	0 / 5	0 / 5	0 / 5
Gaborone	51.3% 32,922	24.9% 15,992	21.4% 13,720	0.8% 521	1.6% 1,047
Ngamiland	0 / 6	0 / 6	6 / 6	0 / 6	0 / 6
Ngamiland	7.3% 4,832	32.6% 21,706	57.5% 38,282	2.7% 1,796	0.0% –
Francistown	3 / 3	0 / 3	0 / 3	0 / 3	0 / 3
Francistown	55.3% 15,810	20.0% 5,713	17.9% 5,113	6.9% 1,979	0.0% –
Kgatleng	1 / 3	1 / 3	1 / 3	0 / 3	0 / 3
Kgatleng	36.9% 15,394	33.6% 14,017	25.6% 10,686	4.0% 1,656	0.0% –
South-East	2 / 3	0 / 3	1 / 3	0 / 3	0 / 3
South-East	41.5% 19,969	31.3% 15,055	25.2% 12,127	0.2% 87	1.8% 857
Kgalagadi	2 / 2	0 / 2	0 / 2	0 / 2	0 / 2
Kgalagadi	52.4% 13,844	41.3% 10,931	2.2% 590	4.1% 1,074	0.0% –
North-East	1 / 2	0 / 2	1 / 2	0 / 2	0 / 2
North-East	38.8% 10,405	27.2% 7,295	26.7% 7,169	0.0% –	7.4% 1,974
Selebi-Phikwe	0 / 2	0 / 2	2 / 2	0 / 2	0 / 2
Selebi-Phikwe	27.0% 4,097	26.9% 4,070	38.9% 5,896	2.8% 417	4.4% 670
Ghanzi	2 / 2	0 / 2	0 / 2	0 / 2	0 / 2
Ghanzi	49.9% 10,823	35.2% 7,648	7.2% 1,570	7.7% 1,666	0.0% –
Chobe	0 / 1	0 / 1	1 / 1	0 / 1	0 / 1
Chobe	5.7% 481	30.5% 2,585	61.8% 5,238	1.7% 148	0.2% 21
Total	36 / 61	4 / 61	15 / 61	5 / 61	1 / 61
Total	37.2% 310,869	30.5% 254,583	21.1% 175,972	8.3% 68,978	3.0% 25,011

=== Results by constituency ===
Results by constituency — 2024 Botswana general election
Constituency	2019	Winning party					Turnout (Note: Including spoilt ballots)	Votes (Note: Minor political parties receiving less than 1% of the national popular vote are aggregated under "Other"; independent candidates are aggregated separately)						
Constituency	2019	Party	Votes	Share	Margin (raw votes)	Margin (% points)	Turnout	BDP	UDC	BCP	BPF	Ind	Other	Total
Chobe	BDP	BCP	5,238	61.8%	2,653	31.3	78.7%	2,585	481	5,238	148	21	0	8,473
Maun North	UDC	BCP	8,377	64.1%	5,707	43.7	77.5%	2,670	2,025	8,377	0	0	0	13,072
Maun East	UDC	BCP	7,485	59.1%	4,061	32.1	78.1%	3,424	1,560	7,485	188	0	0	12,657
Maun West	UDC	BCP	7,260	55.6%	2,709	20.7	79.4%	4,551	1,247	7,260	0	0	0	13,058
Ngami	UDC	BCP	5,877	59.5%	2,255	22.8	84.4%	3,622	0	5,877	371	0	0	9,870
Okavango West	UDC	BCP	5,016	53.1%	1,049	11.1	83.8%	3,967	0	5,016	460	0	0	9,443
Okavango East	UDC	BCP	4,267	50.1%	795	9.3	84.8%	3,472	0	4,267	777	0	0	8,516
Tati West	BDP	UDC	6,713	50.0%	3,490	26.0	83.2%	3,223	6,713	2,679	0	0	813	13,428
Tati East	BDP	BCP	4,490	33.5%	418	3.1	82.4%	4,072	3,692	4,490	0	1,161	0	13,415
Francistown East	BDP	UDC	3,081	36.8%	370	4.4	76.2%	2,711	3,081	1,741	830	0	0	8,363
Francistown South	AP	UDC	6,506	67.7%	5,109	53.2	78.7%	1,397	6,506	942	763	0	0	9,608
Francistown West	BDP	UDC	6,223	58.5%	3,793	35.6	77.9%	1,605	6,223	2,430	386	0	0	10,644
Nata-Gweta	BDP	BPF	6,205	52.5%	3,916	33.2	81.1%	2,289	844	1,934	6,205	0	539	11,811
Nkange	UDC	BCP	9,337	43.1%	2,634	12.2	81.4%	5,134	6,703	9,337	486	0	0	21,660
Shashe West	BDP	BPF	6,801	53.5%	3,812	30.0	83.7%	2,989	1,281	1,649	6,801	0	0	12,720
Tonota	UDC	UDC	7,024	48.2%	2,509	17.2	82.8%	4,515	7,024	990	1,814	230	0	14,573
Bobirwa	UDC	BCP	10,074	52.6%	2,343	12.2	82.9%	7,731	703	10,074	656	0	0	19,164
Mmadinare	BDP	UDC	3,285	30.3%	38	0.4	80.6%	2,849	3,285	3,247	1,333	0	116	10,830
Selebi-Phikwe West	UDC	BCP	3,054	36.9%	36	0.4	77.8%	2,196	3,018	3,054	0	0	0	8,268
Selebi-Phikwe East	UDC	BCP	2,842	41.3%	968	14.1	80.2%	1,874	1,079	2,842	417	670	0	6,882
Palapye	UDC	UDC	9,516	44.3%	4,022	18.7	80.7%	3,179	9,516	5,494	1,802	228	1,243	21,462
Tswapong North	BDP	UDC	7,433	37.4%	3,076	15.5	84.6%	3,907	7,433	4,156	4,357	0	0	19,853
Mahalapye East	UDC	UDC	7,140	53.0%	4,140	30.7	82.1%	3,000	7,140	2,100	1,225	0	0	13,465
Mahalapye West	UDC	UDC	9,969	73.2%	7,957	58.4	84.5%	2,012	9,969	818	716	0	103	13,618
Tswapong South	UDC	BCP	5,998	38.2%	1,626	10.4	85.3%	4,050	4,372	5,998	970	303	0	15,693
Shoshong	UDC	UDC	7,745	58.2%	5,112	38.4	82.1%	2,633	7,745	459	2,260	0	205	13,302
Serowe North	BPF	BPF	7,635	63.7%	4,836	40.3	81.5%	2,799	0	1,126	7,635	0	433	11,993
Serowe South	BPF	BPF	5,653	44.2%	3,181	24.9	79.4%	2,439	0	1,573	5,653	2,472	658	12,795
Serowe West	BPF	BPF	6,555	65.2%	4,141	41.2	78.5%	2,414	0	864	6,555	0	214	10,047
Boteti East	BDP	UDC	6,005	41.9%	2,278	15.9	79.3%	3,727	6,005	1,791	2,653	150	0	14,326
Boteti West	BDP	UDC	7,495	49.2%	2,235	14.7	83.6%	5,260	7,495	2,488	0	0	0	15,243
Kgatleng Central	BDP	UDC	7,241	43.6%	2,114	12.7	81.4%	5,127	7,241	3,777	452	0	0	16,597
Kgatleng East	BDP	BDP	4,661	39.6%	30	0.3	83.3%	4,661	4,631	2,484	0	0	0	11,776
Kgatleng West	BDP	BCP	4,425	33.1%	196	1.5	81.6%	4,229	3,522	4,425	1,204	0	0	13,380
Gaborone Central	BDP	UDC	5,493	47.3%	2,381	20.5	76.4%	2,826	5,493	3,112	122	24	35	11,612
Gaborone North	BDP	UDC	5,356	37.3%	935	6.5	82.0%	4,072	5,356	4,421	121	0	396	14,366
Gaborone South	BDP	UDC	7,668	60.3%	4,740	37.3	74.9%	2,928	7,668	1,742	0	377	0	12,715
Gaborone Bonnington North	BDP	UDC	5,600	47.9%	2,565	21.9	83.8%	3,035	5,600	2,714	195	0	148	11,692
Gaborone Bonnington South	BDP	UDC	8,805	63.7%	5,674	41.1	80.8%	3,131	8,805	1,731	83	0	67	13,817
Tlokweng	BDP	UDC	8,498	57.6%	4,351	29.5	81.7%	4,147	8,498	1,948	0	153	0	14,746
Gamalete	BDP	BCP	9,838	42.8%	1,629	7.1	84.9%	8,209	4,599	9,838	87	188	71	22,992
Mogoditshane East	BDP	UDC	4,433	45.4%	1,103	11.3	78.7%	3,330	4,433	1,873	0	0	132	9,768
Mogoditshane West	BDP	UDC	4,360	42.5%	1,375	13.4	76.5%	2,985	4,360	2,279	455	190	0	10,269
Gabane-Mmankgodi	BDP	BDP	4,898	37.0%	434	3.3	82.6%	4,898	4,464	3,702	157	0	0	13,221
Mmopane-Metsimotlhabe	BDP	UDC	3,431	33.2%	120	1.2	80.1%	3,311	3,431	1,676	1,812	81	23	10,334
Thamaga-Kumakwane	BDP	BDP	8,310	53.3%	2,191	14.0	82.0%	8,310	6,119	1,166	0	0	0	15,595
Molepolole South	BDP	UDC	8,266	51.6%	2,364	14.7	79.6%	5,902	8,266	1,100	568	195	0	16,031
Molepolole North	BDP	UDC	9,729	54.5%	3,057	17.1	80.6%	6,672	9,729	811	474	165	0	17,851
Lentsweletau-Lephephe	BDP	UDC	6,555	42.9%	1,116	7.3	82.3%	5,439	6,555	1,720	1,283	166	125	15,288
Letlhakeng	BDP	UDC	7,139	60.7%	4,163	35.4	84.4%	2,976	7,139	1,237	238	177	0	11,767
Takatokwane	BDP	UDC	7,246	63.2%	3,706	32.3	88.0%	3,540	7,246	0	679	0	0	11,465
Lobatse	BDP	UDC	6,872	66.4%	4,173	40.3	80.9%	2,699	6,872	341	0	445	0	10,357
Goodhope-Mmathethe	BDP	Ind.	12,294	45.1%	5,151	18.9	83.5%	7,143	6,513	878	458	12,294	0	27,286
Kanye East	BDP	UDC	10,833	59.6%	3,488	19.2	78.1%	7,345	10,833	0	0	0	0	18,178
Kanye West	BDP	UDC	8,480	53.3%	2,335	14.7	81.7%	6,145	8,480	1,278	0	0	0	15,903
Moshupa-Manyana	BDP	BDP	13,422	59.5%	6,865	30.4	81.9%	13,422	6,557	2,578	0	0	0	22,557
Jwaneng-Mabutsane	BDP	UDC	8,652	44.5%	1,426	7.3	82.7%	7,226	8,652	1,185	2,389	0	0	19,452
Kgalagadi North	BDP	UDC	5,144	48.6%	283	2.7	87.2%	4,861	5,144	590	0	0	0	10,595
Kgalagadi South	BDP	UDC	8,700	54.9%	2,630	16.6	86.9%	6,070	8,700	0	1,074	0	0	15,844
Ghanzi	BDP	UDC	7,575	54.9%	2,880	20.9	79.5%	4,695	7,575	0	1,529	0	0	13,799
Charleshill	UDC	UDC	3,248	41.1%	295	3.7	85.6%	2,953	3,248	1,570	137	0	0	7,908

=== Analysis ===
Party candidates in 1st and 2nd place
Party in 1st place	Party in 2nd place					Total
Party in 1st place	UDC	BCP	BDP	BPF	Ind.	Total
UDC		5	30	1		36
BCP	3		12			15
BPF			4		1	5
BDP	4					4
Ind.			1			1
Total	7	5	47	1	1	61

Principal match-ups, according to 1st and 2nd-place results
Party in 1st place	Party in 2nd place	Seats
Umbrella for Democratic Change	Botswana Democratic Party	30
Botswana Congress Party	Botswana Democratic Party	12
Umbrella for Democratic Change	Botswana Congress Party	5
Botswana Patriotic Front	Botswana Democratic Party	4
Botswana Democratic Party	Umbrella for Democratic Change	4
Botswana Congress Party	Umbrella for Democratic Change	3
Umbrella for Democratic Change	Botswana Patriotic Front	1
Botswana Patriotic Front	Independent	1
Independent	Botswana Democratic Party	1
Total		61

=== Seats changing hands ===
Seats won/lost by party
Party	2019	Gain from (loss to)														2024
Party	2019	BDP		UDC		BCP		BPF		AP		Ind.		New		2024
BDP	38				(27)		(4)		(2)				(1)			4
UDC	15	27					(9)			1				2		36
BCP	0	4		9										2		15
BPF	3	2														5
AP	1				(1)											0
Ind.	0	1														1
Total	57	34	–	9	(28)	–	(13)	–	(2)	1	–	–	(1)	4	–	61

The following seats changed allegiance from the 2019 results. The comparison is based on the party or alliance label under which each seat was won in 2019 and does not take account of changes in party affiliation during the 12th Parliament. Therefore, BCP members elected under the UDC banner in 2019 are treated as UDC-held seats. Due to the 2022 redistribution, constituencies are listed by the names used at the 2024 general election.

BDP to UDC (27)

- Tati West
- Francistown East
- Francistown West
- Mmadinare
- Tswapong North
- Boteti East
- Boteti West
- Gaborone Central
- Gaborone North
- Gaborone South
- Gaborone Bonnington North
- Gaborone Bonnington South
- Tlokweng
- Mogoditshane East
- Mmopane-Metsimotlhabe
- Molepolole South
- Molepolole North
- Lentsweletau-Lephephe
- Letlhakeng
- Takatokwane
- Lobatse
- Kanye East
- Kanye West
- Jwaneng-Mabutsane
- Kgalagadi North
- Kgalagadi South
- Ghanzi

BDP to BCP (4)

- Chobe
- Tati East
- Kgatleng West
- Gamalete

BDP to BPF (2)

- Nata-Gweta
- Shashe West

BDP to Ind. (1)

- Goodhope-Mmathethe

UDC to BCP (9)

- Maun East
- Maun West
- Ngami
- Okavango West
- Nkange
- Bobirwa
- Selebi-Phikwe East
- Selebi-Phikwe West
- Tswapong South

AP to UDC (1)

- Francistown South

New seats won by UDC (2)

- Kgatleng Central
- Mogoditshane West

New seats won by BCP (2)

- Maun North
- Okavango East

=== Gallagher index ===
The table below presents the proportionality of parliamentary seats won in the 2024 election, as measured by the Gallagher index. This election yielded an index score of 23.04, indicating a highly disproportionate outcome that strongly favoured the UDC and BCP while being significantly disadvantageous for the BDP. This is the most disproportionate result ever recorded in Botswana general election.

Gallagher index for the 2024 Botswana general election
Party	% of votes	seats won	% of seats	difference	difference squared
UDC	37.21	36	59.02	21.81	475.68
BDP	30.47	4	6.56	(23.91)	571.69
BCP	21.06	15	24.59	3.53	12.46
BPF	8.26	5	8.20	(0.06)	0.003
Other	3.00	1	1.64	(1.36)	1.85
Total	100.00	61	100.00	(0.00)	1,061.68
Difference halved					530.84
Square root					23.04

== Aftermath ==
BDP leader and President Mokgweetsi Masisi conceded defeat to the UDC and Duma Boko on 1 November 2024. Boko praised the election result as an example of democracy in action, adding that "What has happened today takes our democracy to a higher level". Boko was inaugurated as president on 1 November at 5:35 p.m.

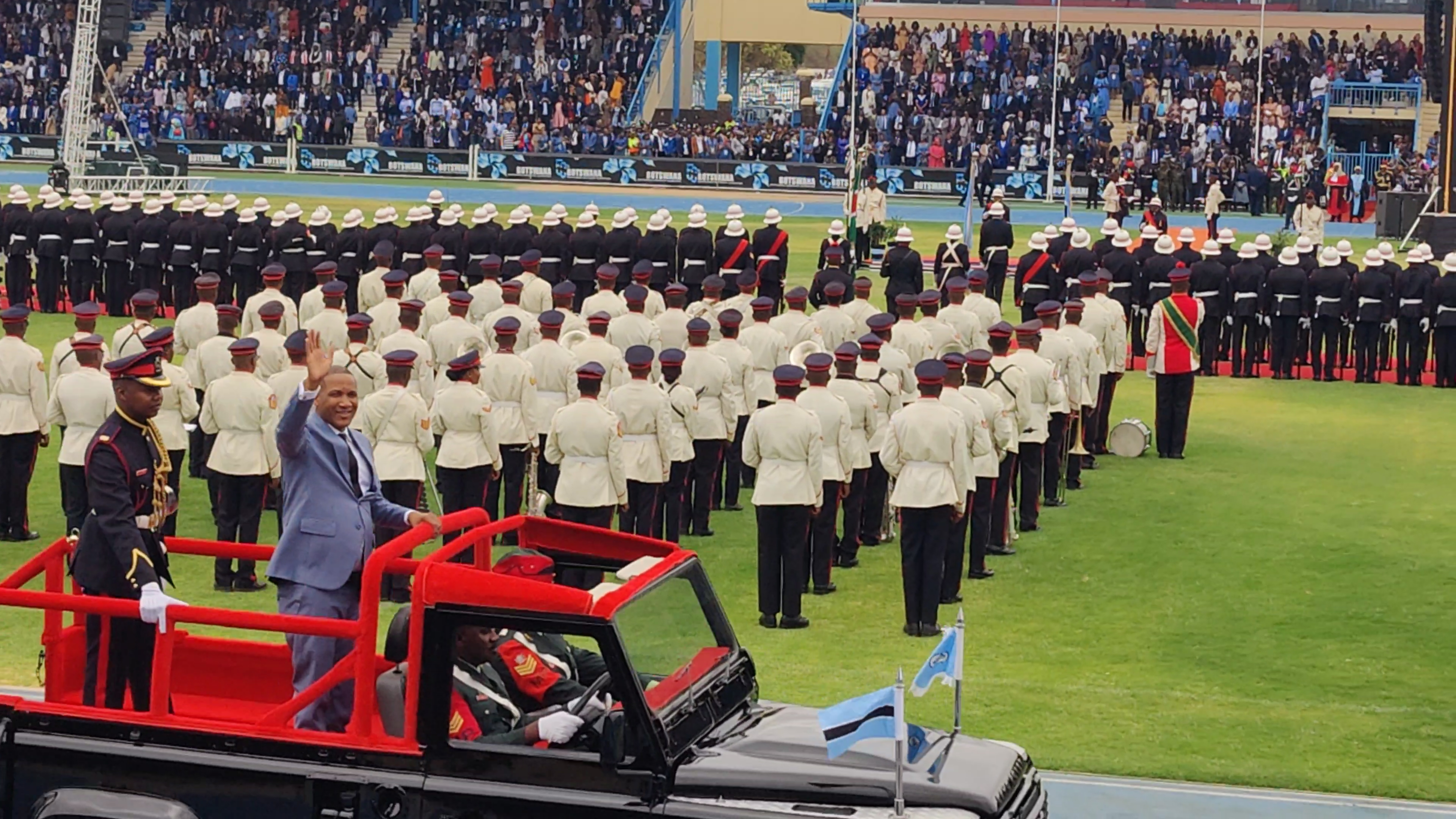
Duma Boko at his inauguration ceremony on 8 November 2024.

=== International reactions ===
- African Union – The Chairperson of the African Union Commission, Moussa Faki, congratulated Duma Boko and the Umbrella for Democratic Change (UDC), describing the election as "peaceful, transparent and credible". He also commended outgoing president Mokgweetsi Masisi for conceding defeat before the official announcement of the final results and for facilitating a smooth transfer of power.
- European Union – The EU congratulated Boko and the people of Botswana, describing the transition of power following Masisi's concession as "exemplary". It stated that Botswana and the EU shared democratic values and a strong economic partnership.
- Southern African Development Community – The SADC Electoral Observation Mission stated in its preliminary report that the pre-election and voting phases were conducted in a peaceful and orderly manner. It called on all stakeholders to maintain peace as the final stages of the electoral process were completed.
- Commonwealth of Nations – The Commonwealth Expert Team described the election as credible, peaceful and orderly, while noting that it had taken place in a highly competitive political environment. The team praised both Masisi's concession and Boko's acceptance speech, stating that their conduct helped strengthen Botswana's democratic credentials.
- South Africa – President Cyril Ramaphosa congratulated Boko and the UDC, commended Masisi for supporting the transition and said the election demonstrated democratic maturity in the region.
- Namibia – President Nangolo Mbumba congratulated Boko and the UDC on their victory, praised Masisi for accepting the will of the voters, and said Namibia looked forward to strengthening bilateral relations with Botswana.
- Zambia – President Hakainde Hichilema congratulated Boko and commended Masisi for conceding defeat, describing the result as a victory for democracy and the will of the people.
- Zimbabwe – President Emmerson Mnangagwa, then chairperson of SADC, congratulated Boko and said Zimbabwe looked forward to continued cooperation with Botswana bilaterally, regionally and multilaterally.
- United States – The United States Department of State congratulated the UDC and Boko on what it called a historic victory, commended Masisi's leadership during the transition and said it would continue to support Botswana's democratic institutions and bilateral partnership with the United States.
- China – President Xi Jinping congratulated Boko on his election and said China was ready to work with the new administration to advance the strategic partnership between the two countries.
- Japan – The Ministry of Foreign Affairs congratulated Boko and stated that Japan hoped to strengthen cooperation with Botswana in areas including mineral resources, education and human resources development.
- France – France congratulated Boko, praised the vitality of Botswana's democracy and commended Masisi's commitment to preparing the transfer of power quickly.

== See also ==
- 1993 Canadian federal election – saw the governing Progressive Conservatives get reduced from a majority government to two seats.
- 2024 South African general election – saw the African National Congress lose its majority for the first time since the end of Apartheid
- Goodhope-Mmathethe in the 2024 Botswana general election
