= Maun North =

Constituency in the North-West District, Botswana

- Single-member constituency for the National Assembly
- District: North-West
- Population: 39,303
- Major settlements: Maun
- Area: 21,522 km^{2}

Current constituency
- Created: 2022
- Party: BCP
- Created from: Maun West; Maun East; Okavango
- MP: Dumelang Saleshando
- Margin of victory: 5,707 (43.7 pp)

Maun North is a constituency in the North-West represented in the National Assembly of Botswana. Further to the completion of the 2022 Delimitation of Parliamentary constituencies, the seat was first contested at the 2024 general election, since when it has been held by Dumelang Saleshando of the Botswana Congress Party, who is also the current Leader of the Opposition.

== Constituency profile ==
The seat is predominantly rural, encompassing parts of northern Maun. The seat has the following localities:

1. Parts of Maun
2. Sankoyo
3. Shorobe
4. Khwai
5. Xaxaba
6. Mababe
7. Ditshiping

== Members of Parliament ==
Key: BCP

Election	Winner
2024 election	Dumelang Saleshando

== Election results ==
=== 2024 election ===
General election 2024: Maun North
Party	Candidate	Votes	%
BCP	Dumelang Saleshando	8,377	64.08
BDP	Thato Elias	2,670	20.43
UDC	Kebareeditse Ntsogotho	2,025	15.49
Margin of victory		5,707	43.66
Total valid votes		13,072	96.37
Rejected ballots		492	3.63
Turnout		13,564	77.51
Registered electors		17,499	
BCP win (new seat)			
