= Gamalete (Botswana constituency) =

Parliamentary constituency in Botswana

- Single-member constituency for the National Assembly
- District: South-East
- Population: 55,131
- Electorate: 27,251
- Major settlements: Ramotswa
- Area: 1,144 km^{2}

Current constituency
- Created: 2004
- Party: BCP
- Created from: South-East
- MP: Boniface Mabeo
- Margin of victory: 1,629 (7.1 pp)

Gamalete is a constituency in the South-East District represented by Boniface Mabeo, a BCP MP in the National Assembly of Botswana since 2024.

== Constituency profile ==
Gamalete was created from the former South-East constituency ahead of the 2004 general election. It was first contested as South East South in the 2004 and 2009 general elections, before being renamed Ramotswa for the 2014 and 2019 elections. Following the 2022 delimitation process, the constituency was renamed Gamalete and was first contested under this name at the 2024 general election.

The constituency is anchored by Ramotswa, the main settlement of the Gamalete area, and extends across a mixed peri-urban, village and rural landscape south of Gaborone. Its position on the southern edge of the capital region gives it both commuter-belt characteristics and a wider rural hinterland.

Politically, the constituency has been competitive between the BDP and the BCP. The BDP won the seat at its first two elections in 2004 and 2009, before the BCP gained it in 2014. The BDP regained the seat in 2019 with a large majority, but the BCP won it back in 2024 amidst a nationwide wave against the party.

The constituency has the following localities:

1. Ramotswa
2. Taung
3. Otse
4. Mogobane
5. Kgale
6. Boatle
7. Metsimaswaane
8. Lobatse Farms
9. Notwane Farms
10. Mokolodi Nature Reserve

== Members of Parliament ==
Key: BDP BCP

Election	Winner
2004 election	Lesego Motsumi
2009 election	Odirile Motlhale
2014 election	Samuel Rantuana
2019 election	Lefoko Moagi
2024 election	Boniface Mabeo

== Election results ==
=== 2024 election ===
General election 2024: Gamalete
Party	Candidate	Votes	%	±%
BCP	Boniface Mabeo	9,838	42.79	N/A
BDP	Derrick Tlhoiwe	8,209	35.70	−28.10
UDC	Gofaone Keakile	4,599	20.00	−8.81
Independent	Robert Setshogo	188	0.82	N/A
BPF	Patrick Molete	87	0.38	N/A
BRP	John Mhladi	71	0.31	N/A
Margin of victory		1,629	7.09	N/A
Total valid votes		22,992	99.37	−0.05
Rejected ballots		145	0.63	+0.05
Turnout		23,137	84.90	−3.61
Registered electors		27,251		
BCP gain from BDP		Swing	N/A	

=== 2019 election ===
General election 2019: Ramotswa
Party	Candidate	Votes	%	±%
BDP	Lefoko Moagi	12,969	63.81	+26.24
UDC	Samuel Rantuana	5,857	28.82	+15.27
AP	Boniface Mabeo	1,338	6.58	N/A
Independent	Tseleng Botlhole	161	0.79	N/A
Margin of victory		7,112	34.99	N/A
Total valid votes		20,325	99.43	+0.98
Rejected ballots		117	0.57	−0.98
Turnout		20,442	88.52	−0.53
Registered electors		23,094		
BDP gain from UDC		Swing	N/A	

=== 2014 election ===
General election 2014: Ramotswa
Party	Candidate	Votes	%	±%
BCP	Samuel Rantuana	7,307	41.04	−4.15
BDP	Odirile Tlhole	6,689	37.57	−10.33
UDC	Gaontebale Mphafe	2,412	13.55	+7.55
Independent	Tshekiso Sorinyane	1,398	7.85	N/A
Margin of victory		618	3.47	N/A
Total valid votes		17,806	98.45	−0.45
Rejected ballots		281	1.55	+0.45
Turnout		18,087	89.05	+6.56
Registered electors		20,312		
BCP gain from BDP		Swing	+3.09	

=== 2009 election ===
General election 2009: South East South
Party	Candidate	Votes	%	±%
BDP	Odirile Motlhale	6,084	47.90	+6.63
BCP	Lepete Setshwaelo	5,739	45.18	+15.36
BNF	Ramasu Mogatle	762	6.00	−22.91
Independent	Patrick Mogapi	117	0.92	N/A
Margin of victory		345	2.72	−8.74
Total valid votes		12,702	98.89	+0.84
Rejected ballots		142	1.11	−0.84
Turnout		12,844	82.48	+1.49
Registered electors		15,572		
BDP hold		Swing	−4.37	

=== 2004 election ===
General election 2004: South East South
Party	Candidate	Votes	%
BDP	Lesego Motsumi	3,769	41.27
BCP	Linus Dikhudu	2,723	29.82
BNF	Ephraim Setshwaelo	2,640	28.91
Margin of victory		1,046	11.45
Total valid votes		9,132	98.06
Rejected ballots		181	1.94
Turnout		9,313	80.99
Registered electors		11,499	
BDP win (new seat)			
