= Selebi-Phikwe East =

Parliamentary constituency in the Selebi-Phikwe, 2002 onwards

- Single-member constituency for the National Assembly
- District: Selebi-Phikwe
- Population: 20,902
- Major settlements: Selebi-Phikwe
- Area: 53 km^{2}

Current constituency
- Created: 2002
- Party: BCP
- Created from: Selebi-Phikwe
- MP: Kgoberego Nkawana
- Margin of victory: 968 (14.1 pp)

Selebi-Phikwe East is a constituency in Selebi-Phikwe represented in the National Assembly of Botswana since 2019 by Kgoborego Nkawana a BCP MP.

== Constituency profile ==
The constituency was created alongside Selebi-Phikwe West in 2002 for the 2004 election, when the Selebi-Phikwe constituency was divided into two. Nonofo Molefhi from the BDP won the constituency in 2004, 2009 and 2014, mostly due to the division of opposition votes between the BCP and the BNF (later the UDC). In 2019, after the BCP joined the UDC, its candidate Kgoborego Nkawana won the constituency. The constituency is completely urban and encompasses only the eastern part of the Selibe Phikwe Township.

== Members of Parliament ==
Key: BDP UDC BCP

Election	Winner
2004 election	Nonofo Molefhi
2009 election	Nonofo Molefhi
2014 election	Nonofo Molefhi
2019 election	Kgoborego Nkawana
2024 election	Kgoborego Nkawana

== Election results ==
=== 2024 election ===
General election 2024: Selebi-Phikwe East
Party	Candidate	Votes	%	±%
BCP	Kgoberego Nkawana	2,842	41.30	N/A
BDP	Amogelang Mojuta	1,874	27.23	−10.25
UDC	Tebogo Venson	1,079	15.68	−35.52
BPF	Mokubung Mokubung	417	6.06	N/A
Margin of victory		968	14.07	+0.35
Total valid votes		6,882	97.89	−1.90
Rejected ballots		148	2.11	+1.90
Turnout		7,030	80.21	−1.91
Registered electors		8,764		
BCP hold		Swing	+25.78	

=== 2019 election ===
General election 2019: Selebi-Phikwe East
Party	Candidate	Votes	%	±%
UDC	Kgoberego Nkawana	3,903	51.20	+1.68
BDP	Amogelang Mojuta	2,857	37.48	−3.16
AP	Oarabile Tshenyego	781	10.25	+0.40
Independent	Thebe Ramokhua	82	1.08	N/A
Margin of victory		1,046	13.72	N/A
Total valid votes		7,623	99.79	+0.44
Rejected ballots		16	0.21	−0.44
Turnout		7,639	82.12	−3.79
Registered electors		9,302		
UDC gain from BDP		Swing	+2.42	

=== 2014 election ===
General election 2014: Selebi-Phikwe East
Party	Candidate	Votes	%	±%
BDP	Nonofo Molefhi	3,376	40.64	−7.49
BCP	Kgoberego Nkawana	3,134	37.73	−3.32
UDC	Dimpho Mashaba	979	11.79	+2.71
Independent	Oarabile Tshenyego	818	9.85	N/A
Margin of victory		242	2.91	−4.17
Total valid votes		8,307	99.35	+0.22
Rejected ballots		54	0.65	−0.22
Turnout		8,361	85.91	+7.18
Registered electors		9,732		
BDP hold		Swing	−5.41	

=== 2009 election ===
General election 2009: Selebi-Phikwe East
Party	Candidate	Votes	%	±%
BDP	Nonofo Molefhi	3,717	48.13	+7.03
BCP	Nzwaligwa Nzwaligwa	3,170	41.05	+2.31
BNF	Billy Makuku	701	9.08	−10.16
Independent	Itumeleng Ngakaetsile	135	1.75	N/A
Margin of victory		547	7.08	+4.72
Total valid votes		7,723	99.13	+0.07
Rejected ballots		68	0.87	−0.07
Turnout		7,791	78.73	−1.01
Registered electors		9,896		
BDP hold		Swing	+4.67	

=== 2004 election ===
General election 2004: Selebi-Phikwe East
Party	Candidate	Votes	%
BDP	Nonofo Molefhi	2,629	41.10
BCP	Nzwaligwa Nzwaligwa	2,478	38.74
BNF	Calistus Keotswetse	1,231	19.24
Independent	Boiki Gaseitsewe	59	0.92
Margin of victory		151	2.36
Total valid votes		6,397	99.06
Rejected ballots		61	0.94
Turnout		6,458	79.74
Registered electors		8,099	
BDP win (new seat)			
