= Kgatleng Central =

Parliamentary constituency in the Kgatleng District Botswana, 2024 onwards

- Single-member constituency for the National Assembly
- District: Kgatleng
- Population: 45,921
- Major settlements: Mochudi
- Area: 427 km^{2}

Current constituency
- Created: 2024
- Party: UDC
- Created from: Mochudi West; Mochudi East
- MP: Mpho Morolong
- Margin of victory: 2,114 (12.7 pp)

Kgatleng Central is a constituency in the Kgatleng represented in the National Assembly of Botswana by Mpho Morolong of the UDC. Further to the completion of the 2022 Delimitation of Parliamentary constituencies, the seat was first contested at the 2024 general election.

== Constituency profile ==
The seat is predominantly rural and encompasses the following localities:

1. Parts of Mochudi
2. Malotwana

== Members of Parliament ==
Key: UDC

Election	Winner
2024 election	Mpho Morolong

== Election results ==
=== 2024 election ===
General election 2024: Kgatleng Central
Party	Candidate	Votes	%
UDC	Mpho Morolong	7,241	43.63
BDP	Mmusi Kgafela	5,127	30.89
BCP	Nninka Senwelo	3,777	22.78
BPF	Donald Seleke	452	2.72
Margin of victory		2,114	12.74
Total valid votes		16,597	99.51
Rejected ballots		81	0.49
Turnout		16,678	81.42
Registered electors		20,485	
UDC notional gain from BDP			
