= Boteti West =

Parliamentary constituency in Botswana

- Single-member constituency for the National Assembly
- District: Central
- Population: 37,664
- Electorate: 18,397
- Major settlements: Orapa; Rakops
- Area: 19,290 km^{2}

Current constituency
- Created: 2004
- Party: UDC
- Created from: Boteti
- MP: Sam Digwa
- Margin of victory: 2,235 (14.7 pp)

Boteti West is a constituency in the Central District represented by Sam Digwa, a UDC MP in the National Assembly of Botswana since 2024.

== Constituency profile ==
Boteti West was created from the former Boteti constituency ahead of the 2004 general election. It was contested as Boteti North in 2004 and 2009, before being contested as Boteti West from the 2014 general election onwards.

The constituency lies in the Central District and includes Orapa, Mopipi, Rakops and surrounding villages.

The constituency has the following localities:

1. Orapa
2. Mopipi
3. Xhumo
4. Rakops
5. Xere
6. Kedia
7. Toromoja
8. Motopi
9. Moreomaoto
10. Mokoboxane
11. Mmadikola
12. Makalamabedi

== Members of Parliament ==
Key: BDP UDC

Election	Winner
2004 election	Slumber Tsogwane
2009 election	Slumber Tsogwane
2014 election	Slumber Tsogwane
2019 election	Slumber Tsogwane
2024 election	Sam Digwa

== Election results ==
=== 2024 election ===
General election 2024: Boteti West
Party	Candidate	Votes	%	±%
UDC	Sam Digwa	7,495	49.17	+1.43
BDP	Slumber Tsogwane	5,260	34.51	−15.31
BCP	Thomas Kgethenyane	2,488	16.32	N/A
Margin of victory		2,235	14.66	+12.58
Total valid votes		15,243	99.15	−0.07
Rejected ballots		131	0.85	+0.07
Turnout		15,374	83.57	+0.32
Registered electors		18,397		
UDC gain from BDP		Swing	+8.37	

=== 2019 election ===
General election 2019: Boteti West
Party	Candidate	Votes	%	±%
BDP	Slumber Tsogwane	7,006	49.82	+1.41
UDC	Sam Digwa	6,713	47.74	+1.34
AP	Michael Molathiwa	344	2.45	N/A
Margin of victory		293	2.08	+0.07
Total valid votes		14,063	99.22	+0.46
Rejected ballots		111	0.78	−0.46
Turnout		14,174	83.25	+0.01
Registered electors		17,026		
BDP hold		Swing	+0.03	

=== 2014 election ===
General election 2014: Boteti West
Party	Candidate	Votes	%	±%
BDP	Slumber Tsogwane	5,790	48.41	−4.83
UDC	Sam Digwa	5,549	46.39	+4.73
BCP	Tjiliga B. Letsholo	622	5.20	+0.10
Margin of victory		241	2.01	−9.57
Total valid votes		11,961	98.75	+1.56
Rejected ballots		151	1.25	−1.56
Turnout		12,112	83.24	+8.88
Registered electors		14,551		
BDP hold		Swing	−4.78	

=== 2009 election ===
General election 2009: Boteti North
Party	Candidate	Votes	%	±%
BDP	Slumber Tsogwane	4,790	53.24	−2.16
BNF	Sam Digwa	3,748	41.66	+4.62
BCP	King Disana	459	5.10	−2.46
Margin of victory		1,042	11.58	−6.79
Total valid votes		8,997	97.19	+0.14
Rejected ballots		260	2.81	−0.14
Turnout		9,257	74.36	−2.85
Registered electors		12,449		
BDP hold		Swing	−3.39	

=== 2004 election ===
General election 2004: Boteti North
Party	Candidate	Votes	%
BDP	Slumber Tsogwane	3,870	55.40
BNF	Lebonetse Bolokang	2,587	37.04
BCP	Elijah Motsamai	528	7.56
Margin of victory		1,283	18.37
Total valid votes		6,985	97.05
Rejected ballots		212	2.95
Turnout		7,197	77.21
Registered electors		9,321	
BDP win (new seat)			
