= Maun East =

Parliamentary constituency in the North-West District of Botswana, 2002 onwards

- Single-member constituency for the National Assembly
- District: North-West District
- Population: 42,378
- Area: 24,431 km^{2}

Current constituency
- Created: 2002
- Party: BCP
- MP: Goretetse Kekgonegile
- Margin of victory: 4,061 (32.1 pp)

Maun East is a constituency in the North-West District represented in the National Assembly of Botswana. It has been represented in the National Assembly of Botswana since 2019 by Goretetse Kekgonegile of the Botswana Congress Party.

== Constituency profile ==
The constituency was created in 2002 following the dissolution of the Maun/Chobe constituency and its division in three (Chobe, Maun East and Maun West). It originally consisted mostly of the rural area of Maun. In 2012 part of its territory was added to Maun West. The constituency voted for BDP until 2019, when the UDC won it. The constituency encompasses the following locations:

1. Part of Maun
2. Makalamabedi
3. Chanoga
4. Samedupi
5. Phuduhudu
6. Somelo

== Members of Parliament ==
Key: BDP UDC BCP

Election	Winner
2004 election	Frank Ramsden
2009 election	Frank Ramsden
2014 election	Konstantinos Markus
2019 election	Goretetse Kekgonegile
2024 election	Goretetse Kekgonegile

== Election results ==
=== 2024 election ===
General election 2024: Maun East
Party	Candidate	Votes	%	±%
BCP	Goretetse Kekgonegile	7,485	59.14	N/A
BDP	Oateng Setlhodi	3,424	27.05	−20.84
UDC	Baraedi Lekabe	1,560	12.33	−39.78
BPF	Molatedi Molato	188	1.49	N/A
Margin of victory		4,061	32.09	N/A
Total valid votes		12,657	97.85	−1.64
Rejected ballots		278	2.15	+1.64
Turnout		12,935	78.11	−4.10
Registered electors		16,560		
BCP hold		Swing	+39.99	

=== 2019 election ===
General election 2019: Maun East
Party	Candidate	Votes	%	±%
UDC	Goretetse Kekgonegile	7,739	52.11	–2.63
BDP	Konstantinos Markus	7,112	47.89	+2.96
Margin of victory		627	4.22	N/A
Total valid votes		14,851	99.49	−0.60
Rejected ballots		76	0.51	+0.60
Turnout		14,927	82.21	+1.09
Registered electors		18,157		
UDC gain from BDP		Swing	−2.80	

=== 2014 election ===
General election 2014: Maun East
Party	Candidate	Votes	%	±%
BDP	Konstantinos Markus	6,046	44.93	−9.58
BCP	Goretetse Kekgonegile	5,304	39.42	+16.87
UDC	Osimilwe Fish	2,062	15.32	−6.02
Independent	Simon Lethake	44	0.33	N/A
Margin of victory		742	5.51	−26.45
Total valid votes		13,456	98.89	+0.74
Rejected ballots		151	1.11	−0.74
Turnout		13,607	81.12	+6.25
Registered electors		16,774		
BDP hold		Swing	−13.23	

=== 2009 election ===
General election 2009: Maun East
Party	Candidate	Votes	%	±%
BDP	Frank Ramsden	6,509	54.51	+2.33
BAM	Rodgers Makgetho	2,693	22.55	−8.22
BNF	Mokaulengwe Rendoh	2,548	21.34	N/A
Independent	Ontlametse Gomosie	192	1.61	N/A
Margin of victory		3,816	31.96	+10.55
Total valid votes		11,942	98.15	+0.20
Rejected ballots		225	1.85	−0.20
Turnout		12,167	74.87	+1.20
Registered electors		16,251		
BDP hold		Swing	+5.28	

=== 2004 election ===
General election 2004: Maun East
Party	Candidate	Votes	%
BDP	Frank Ramsden	4,261	52.18
BAM	Wetsho Makgetho	2,513	30.77
BCP	Michael Wright	1,748	17.05
Margin of victory		1,748	21.41
Total valid votes		8,166	98.35
Rejected ballots		137	1.65
Turnout		8,303	73.67
Registered electors		11,271	
BDP win (new seat)			
