= Maun West =

Parliamentary constituency in the North-West District of Botswana, 2002 onwards

- Single-member constituency for the National Assembly
- District: North-West District
- Population: 41,022
- Area: 22,373 km^{2}

Current constituency
- Created: 2002
- Party: BCP
- MP: Caterpillar Hikuama
- Margin of victory: 2,709 (20.8 pp)

Maun West is a constituency in the North-West District. It has been represented in the National Assembly of Botswana since 2024 by Caterpillar Hikuama of the Botswana Congress Party.

== Constituency profile ==
The constituency was created in 2002 following the dissolution of the Maun/Chobe constituency and its division in three (Chobe, Maun East and Maun West). It was originally much smaller and its territory was based almost entirely on the city of Maun. In 2004 and 2009 the constituency voted overwhelmingly for the BDP candidates, Ronald Ridge and Tawana Moremi. Moremi defected from the BDP in 2010 to join the Botswana Movement for Democracy, which later formed the Umbrella for Democratic Change coalition. In 2012 the constituency was expanded with surrounding rural areas of Maun East and Ngami. Moremi was re-elected in 2014 as a UDC candidate. In 2019, the UDC candidate was Dumelang Saleshando, leader of the BCP, winning by a large margin.

The constituency encompasses the following locations:

1. Part of Maun
2. Sehithwa
3. Kareng
4. Bodibeng
5. Komana
6. Toteng
7. Bothatogo
8. Sembogo
9. Makakung

== Members of Parliament ==
Key: BDP UDC UDC BCP

Election	Winner
2004 election	Ronald Ridge
2009 election	Tawana Moremi
2014 election	Tawana Moremi
2019 election	Dumelang Saleshando
2024 election	Caterpillar Hikuama

== Election results ==
=== 2024 election ===
General election 2024: Maun West
Party	Candidate	Votes	%	±%
BCP	Caterpillar Hikuama	7,260	55.60	N/A
BDP	Thato Kwerepe	4,551	34.85	−3.58
UDC	Tiego Mpho	1,247	9.55	−48.68
Margin of victory		2,709	20.75	N/A
Total valid votes		13,058	98.44	−0.96
Rejected ballots		207	1.56	+0.96
Turnout		13,265	79.43	−2.80
Registered electors		16,701		
BCP win (new boundaries)				

=== 2019 election ===
General election 2019: Maun West
Party	Candidate	Votes	%	±%
UDC	Dumelang Saleshando	9,713	58.23	+9.64
BDP	Reaboka Mbulawa	6,409	38.43	+2.78
AP	Moalosi Sebati	557	3.34	N/A
Margin of victory		3,304	19.80	+6.86
Total valid votes		16,679	99.40	−0.44
Rejected ballots		101	0.60	+0.44
Turnout		16,780	82.23	−0.15
Registered electors		20,406		
UDC hold		Swing	+6.21	

=== 2014 election ===
General election 2014: Maun West
Party	Candidate	Votes	%	±%
UDC	Tawana Moremi II	7,271	48.59	N/A
BDP	Reaboka Mbulawa	3,134	35.65	−24.89
BCP	George Lubinda	2,357	15.75	N/A
Margin of victory		1,936	12.94	N/A
Total valid votes		14,963	99.09	+0.43
Rejected ballots		137	0.91	−0.43
Turnout		15,100	82.38	+8.22
Registered electors		18,329		
UDC hold		Swing	N/A	

=== 2009 election ===
General election 2009: Maun West
Party	Candidate	Votes	%	±%
BDP	Tawana Moremi	3,717	60.54	+4.65
BAM	Moaparankwe Mpho	3,170	30.61	+2.52
BNF	Keanewe Maplanka	685	8.85	N/A
Margin of victory		547	29.93	+2.13
Total valid votes		7,739	98.66	+0.19
Rejected ballots		105	1.34	−0.19
Turnout		7,844	74.16	−1.1
Registered electors		10,577		
BDP hold		Swing	+3.59	

=== 2004 election ===
General election 2004: Maun West
Party	Candidate	Votes	%
BDP	Ronald Ridge	3,371	55.89
BAM	Letlhogile Sethoko	1,691	28.09
BCP	Osimilwe Ditsheko	969	16.07
Margin of victory		1,680	27.80
Total valid votes		6,031	98.85
Rejected ballots		70	1.15
Turnout		6,101	75.26
Registered electors		8,107	
BDP win (new seat)			
