= Keorapetse =

Keorapetse is a given name and a surname. Notable people with the name include:

- Dithapelo Keorapetse (born 1981 or 1982), Botswanan politician
- Keorapetse Kgositsile (1938–2018), South African poet
