= Jwaneng-Mabutsane =

Parliamentary constituency in the Southern District of Botswana, 2014 onwards

- Single-member constituency for the National Assembly
- District: Southern
- Population: 51,073
- Major settlements: Jwaneng
- Area: 14,117 km^{2}

Current constituency
- Created: 2014
- Party: UDC
- Created from: Ngwaketse West
- MP: Omphemetse Kwapa
- Margin of victory: 1,426 (7.3 pp)

Jwaneng-Mabutsane is a constituency in the Southern District of Botswana represented in the National Assembly of Botswana by Omphemetse Kwapa of the UDC since 2024.

== Constituency profile ==
The seat's predecessor, Ngwaketse West was a marginal seat for the Botswana National Front from the 2004 election up to its dissolution at the 2012 delimitation exercise, the seat continued this trend by voting for the Umbrella for Democratic Change in the 2014 election. Aligned with the broader success the Botswana Democratic Party (BDP) achieved in the southern parts of Botswana during the 2019 election, the constituency voted for the BDP by 20 percentage points. The constituency is predominantly rural with the mining town of Jwaneng being the largest population centre, it encompasses the following localities:

1. Jwaneng
2. Mokhomma
3. Mahotshwane
4. Thankane
5. Lefhoko
6. Keng
7. Sekoma
8. Morwamosu
9. Betesankwe
10. Maokane
11. Tsonyane
12. Sese
13. Khakhea
14. Khonkhwa
15. Mabutsane
16. Kokong
17. Kanaku
18. Kutuku
19. Itholoke
20. Samane

== Members of Parliament ==
Key: UDC BDP UDC

| Election | Winner |
|---|---|
| 2014 election | Shawn Ntlhaile |
| 2019 election | Mephato Reatile |
| 2024 election | Omphemetse Kwapa |

== Election results ==
=== 2024 election ===
General election 2024: Jwaneng-Mabutsane
| Party | Candidate | Votes | % | ±% |
|---|---|---|---|---|
| UDC | Omphemetse Kwapa | 8,652 | 44.62 | +8.20 |
| BDP | John Motsumi | 7,226 | 37.26 | −19.14 |
| BPF | Mephato Reatile | 2,329 | 12.01 | N/A |
| BCP | Kgakololo Ramoswaane | 1,185 | 6.11 | New |
| Margin of victory | | 1,426 | 7.36 | N/A |
| Total valid votes | | 19,392 | 99.68 | +0.62 |
| Rejected ballots | | 259 | 0.32 | −0.62 |
| Turnout | | 19,651 | 82.41 | −1.92 |
| Registered electors | | 23,844 | | |
| UDC gain from BDP | | Swing | +13.67 | |

=== 2019 election ===
General election 2019: Jwaneng-Mabutsane
| Party | Candidate | Votes | % | ±% |
|---|---|---|---|---|
| BDP | Mephato Reatile | 8,466 | 56.40 | +10.50 |
| UDC | Shawn Ntlhaile | 5,466 | 36.42 | −13.59 |
| AP | Tsietsi Oodira-Kwenje | 934 | 6.22 | New |
| Independent | Alexander Heii | 144 | 0.96 | New |
| Margin of victory | | 3,000 | 19.99 | N/A |
| Total valid votes | | 15,010 | 99.06 | +0.34 |
| Rejected ballots | | 142 | 0.94 | −0.34 |
| Turnout | | 15,152 | 84.33 | −2.26 |
| Registered electors | | 17,968 | | |
| BDP gain from UDC | | Swing | +12.05 | |

=== 2014 election ===
General election 2014: Jwaneng-Mabutsane
| Party | Candidate | Votes | % |
|---|---|---|---|
| UDC | Shawn Ntlhaile | 6,613 | 50.01 |
| BDP | Mephato Reatile | 6,069 | 45.90 |
| BCP | Mathaese Ralekoi | 541 | 4.09 |
| Margin of victory | | 544 | 4.06 |
| Total valid votes | | 13,223 | 98.72 |
| Rejected ballots | | 194 | 1.28 |
| Turnout | | 13,395 | 86.59 |
| Registered electors | | 15,469 | |
| UDC win (new seat) | | | |
