= Mogoditshane East =

Parliamentary constituency in the Kweneng District Botswana, 2024 onwards

- Single-member constituency for the National Assembly
- District: Kweneng
- Population: 43,155
- Major settlements: Mogoditshane
- Area: 20 km^{2}

Current constituency
- Created: 2024
- Party: UDC
- Created from: Mogoditshane
- MP: Letlhogonolo Barongwang
- Margin of victory: 1,103 (11.3 pp)

Mogoditshane East is a constituency in the Kweneng District represented in the National Assembly of Botswana by Letlhogonolo Barongwang of the UDC. Further to the completion of the 2022 Delimitation of Parliamentary constituencies, the seat was first contested at the 2024 general election.

== Constituency profile ==
The seat is entirely urban, encompassing the eastern half of Mogoditshane, a town in the Greater Gaborone area.

1. Eastern half of Mogoditshane

== Members of Parliament ==
Key: UDC

Election	Winner
2024 election	Letlhogonolo Barongwang

== Election results ==
=== 2024 election ===
General election 2024: Mogoditshane East
Party	Candidate	Votes	%
UDC	Letlhogonolo Barongwang	4,433	45.38
BDP	Lilian Moremi	3,330	34.09
BCP	Sedirwa Kgoroba	1,873	19.17
BPF	Gaolatlhe Galebotswe	455	4.66
Margin of victory		1,103	11.29
Total valid votes		9,768	97.59
Rejected ballots		241	2.41
Turnout		10,009	78.75
Registered electors		12,710	
UDC win (new seat)			
