= Mogoditshane West =

Parliamentary constituency in the Kweneng District Botswana, 2024 onwards

- Single-member constituency for the National Assembly
- District: Kweneng
- Population: 39,321
- Major settlements: Mogoditshane
- Area: 72 km^{2}

Current constituency
- Created: 2024
- Party: UDC
- Created from: Mogoditshane
- MP: Galenawabo Lekau
- Margin of victory: 1,375 (13.4 pp)

Mogoditshane West is a constituency in the Kweneng District represented in the National Assembly of Botswana by Galenawabo Lekau of the UDC. Further to the completion of the 2022 Delimitation of Parliamentary constituencies, the seat was first contested at the 2024 general election.

== Constituency profile ==
The seat is entirely urban, encompassing the western half of Mogoditshane, a town in the Greater Gaborone area.

1. Western half of Mogoditshane

== Members of Parliament ==
Key: UDC

Election	Winner
2024 election	Galenawabo Lekau

== Election results ==
=== 2024 election ===
General election 2024: Mogoditshane West
Party	Candidate	Votes	%
UDC	Galenawabo Lekau	4,360	42.48
BDP	Tumiso Rakgare	2,985	29.09
BCP	Julia Chepete	2,279	22.21
BPF	Gaolatlhe Galebotswe	455	4.33
Independent	Dumiso Gatsha	160	1.56
Independent	Othusitse Keautule	13	0.13
Independent	Modisaotsile Tirelo	11	0.11
Margin of victory		1,375	13.39
Total valid votes		10,263	99.32
Rejected ballots		70	0.68
Turnout		10,333	76.49
Registered electors		13,509	
UDC notional gain from BDP			
