= Dithapelo Keorapetse =

Motswana politician

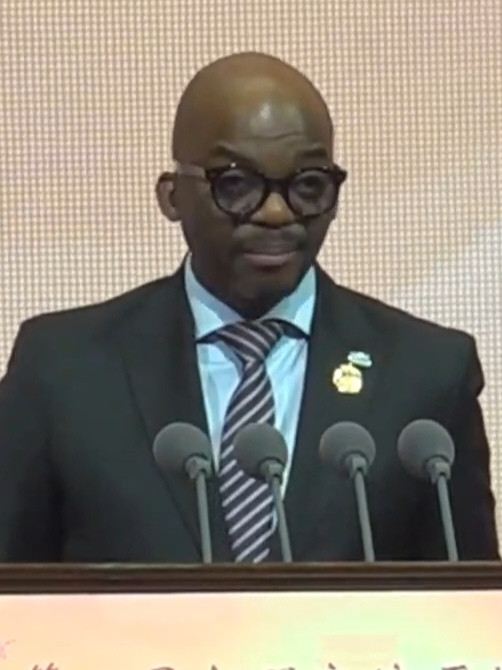
- Keorapetse in 2025

Speaker of the National Assembly of Botswana
- Incumbent
- Assumed office 7 November 2024
- Preceded by: Phandu Skelemani

Leader of the Opposition
- In office 12 July 2022 – 1 November 2024
- Preceded by: Dumelang Saleshando
- Succeeded by: Dumelang Saleshando

Member of Parliament for Selebi-Phikwe West
- In office 28 October 2014 – 5 September 2024
- Preceded by: Gilson Saleshando
- Succeeded by: Reuben Kaizer

Personal details
- Born: 24 February 1982 (age 44)
- Party: Independent
- Other political affiliations: Umbrella for Democratic Change (since 2022); Botswana Congress Party (until 2022)

Dithapelo Keorapetse (born 24 February 1982) is a Motswana politician who is the current Speaker of the National Assembly of Botswana since November 2024. A Member of Parliament from 2014 to 2024, he previously was the Leader of the Opposition from 2022 to 2024. He is affiliated with the Umbrella for Democratic Change (UDC), having been expelled from the Botswana Congress Party (BCP) in 2022.

== Biography ==
Keorapetse was born on 24 February 1982 and is from Selebi-Phikwe, Botswana. Outside of politics, he worked as a political science and public administration lecturer for the University of Botswana, where he served from 2008 to 2019, although he was on unpaid leave from 2014 to 2019. He also worked for the Botswana Police College and was on the staff of the Botswana Defence Force (BDF).

Keorapetse entered politics in 1999, joining the Botswana Congress Party (BCP). From 2002 to 2005, he served as the secretary-general for the BCP UB cell, and later became the BCP Youth League's vice president in 2011, then served as the league's president from 2012 to 2015. He also the information and publicity secretary for the BCP. He was an assistant anti-corruption officer and worked in that position at the Directorate on Corruption and Economic Crime (DCEC) from 2009 to 2010.

In 2014, Keorapetse ran for office to the National Assembly of Botswana as the BCP nominee for the Selebi-Phikwe West constituency, winning with 49.1% of the vote, compared to 36.7% for the runner-up. He became Botswana's youngest active MP and was chosen to be the Opposition Whip for the 11th Parliament of Botswana. He joined the public accounts committee and later became its chairman.

Keorapetse was re-elected in 2019 with 59.1% of the vote. In 2022, he challenged Dumelang Saleshando for the role of Leader of the Opposition (LOO). He was successful and received the position, but him and four other BCP members were then expelled from the party for defying the BCP Central Committee in getting him the role. He thus became an independent with an affiliation with the Umbrella for Democratic Change (UDC). Keorapetse ran for re-election to a third term in 2024 under the UDC banner, and noted that by that time he had introduced eight bills, "a few motions and hundreds of questions and have debated all major policy proposals."

Keorapetse lost his bid for re-election. However, in November, he was nominated to be Speaker of the National Assembly of Botswana. The only nominee, he received the endorsements of MPs from several parties and was elected, becoming the 10th person to be the assembly's speaker.
