= Selebi-Phikwe West =

Parliamentary constituency in Selebi-Phikwe, 2002 onwards

- Single-member constituency for the National Assembly
- District: Selebi-Phikwe
- Population: 21,729
- Major settlements: Selebi-Phikwe
- Area: 89 km^{2}

Current constituency
- Created: 2002
- Party: BCP
- Created from: Selebi-Phikwe
- MP: Reuben Kaizer
- Margin of victory: 36 (0.4 pp)

Selebi-Phikwe West is a constituency in Selebi-Phikwe represented in the National Assembly of Botswana represented in the National Assembly of Botswana since 2024 by Reuben Kaizer, a BCP MP.

== Constituency profile ==
The constituency was created alongside Selebi-Phikwe East in 2002 for the 2004 election, when the Selebi-Phikwe constituency was divided into two. The constituency is home of the BCL Limited mine, whose closure in 2016 left more than 5,000 people unemployed. The constituency's reputation as one of the most anti-BDP of the country is largely attributed to this. Since 2009 it has voted for BCP (or affiliated) candidates.

The urban constituency encompasses the following locations:

1. Selibe Phikwe Township
2. BCL Limited
3. Botswana Defence Force (BDF) Camp
4. Selibe Phikwe State Prison

== Members of Parliament ==
Key: BDP BCP UDC

Election	Winner
2004 election	Kavis Kario
2009 election	Gilson Saleshando
2014 election	Dithapelo Keorapetse
2019 election	Dithapelo Keorapetse
2024 election	Reuben Kaizer

== Election results ==
=== 2024 election ===
General election 2024: Selebi-Phikwe West
Party	Candidate	Votes	%	±%
BCP	Reuben Kaizer	3,054	36.94	N/A
UDC	Dithapelo Keorapetse	3,018	36.50	−22.58
BDP	Beauty Manake	2,196	26.56	−11.03
Margin of victory		36	0.40	N/A
Total valid votes		8,268	99.51	+0.19
Rejected ballots		104	0.49	−0.19
Turnout		8,372	78.70	−5.11
Registered electors		10,638		
BCP gain from UDC		Swing	+29.76	

=== 2019 election ===
General election 2019: Selebi-Phikwe West
Party	Candidate	Votes	%	±%
UDC	Dithapelo Keorapetse	3,987	59.08	+9.98
BDP	Allen Lekwapa	2,537	37.59	+0.74
AP	Masego Mosinyi	225	3.33	N/A
Margin of victory		1,450	21.49	+9.24
Total valid votes		6,749	99.51	+0.19
Rejected ballots		33	0.49	−0.19
Turnout		6,782	83.81	−1.47
Registered electors		8,092		
UDC hold		Swing	+5.36	

=== 2014 election ===
General election 2014: Selebi-Phikwe West
Party	Candidate	Votes	%	±%
BCP	Dithapelo Keorapetse	4,247	49.10	+1.49
BDP	Opelo Makhandlela	3,187	36.85	−2.73
UDC	Moeti Mohwasa	1,215	14.05	+1.23
Margin of victory		1,060	12.25	+4.22
Total valid votes		8,649	99.47	−0.05
Rejected ballots		46	0.53	+0.05
Turnout		8,695	85.28	+6.24
Registered electors		10,196		
BCP hold		Swing	+2.11	

=== 2009 election ===
General election 2009: Selebi-Phikwe West
Party	Candidate	Votes	%	±%
BCP	Gilson Saleshando	3,997	47.61	+9.70
BDP	Kavis Kario	3,323	39.58	−2.36
BNF	Moeti Mohwasa	1,076	12.82	−7.33
Margin of victory		674	8.03	N/A
Total valid votes		8,396	99.61	+0.64
Rejected ballots		33	0.39	−0.64
Turnout		8,429	79.04	−1.6
Registered electors		10,664		
BCP gain from BDP		Swing	+6.03	

=== 2004 election ===
General election 2004: Selebi-Phikwe West
Party	Candidate	Votes	%
BDP	Kavis Kario	3,100	41.94
BCP	Gilson Saleshando	2,802	37.91
BNF	Otsweletse Moupo	1,489	20.15
Margin of victory		298	4.03
Total valid votes		7,391	98.97
Rejected ballots		77	1.03
Turnout		7,468	80.64
Registered electors		9,261	
BDP win (new seat)			
