= Lobatse (Botswana constituency) =

Parliamentary constituency in Gaborone, 1994 onwards

- Single-member constituency for the National Assembly
- District: Lobatse
- Population: 29,824
- Major settlements: Lobatse
- Area: 127 km^{2}

Current constituency
- Created: 1994
- Party: UDC
- Created from: Lobatse/Barolong
- MP: Kamal Jacobs
- Margin of victory: 4,173 (40.3 pp)

Lobatse is a constituency represented in the National Assembly of Botswana represented by Kamal Jacobs of the Umbrella for Democratic Change since 2024.

== Constituency profile ==
The constituency was created for the 1994 elections, in the context of Botswana's increasing urbanization, with the division of Lobatse/Barolong into two proper constituencies. The constituency includes the city of Lobatse and its surrounding rural area. From its creation until 2014 (when BDP won it), Lobatse was a safe seat for the BNF. In 2009 MP Nehemiah Modubule (former Leader of the Opposition and originally from the BNF), ran as an independent and was re-elected, at that time it was the only time any politician has been elected to the Parliament of Botswana as an independent. The constituency has historically been a fertile site for minority third parties and independents, and since its creation has rarely been contested by fewer than five candidates.

== Members of Parliament ==
Key: BNF BDP Independent UDC

Election	Winner
1994 election	Otlaadisa Koosaletse
1999 election	Nehemiah Modubule
2004 election	Nehemiah Modubule
2009 election	Nehemiah Modubule
2014 election	Sadique Kebonang
2019 election	Thapelo Matsheka
2024 election	Kamal Jacobs

== Election results ==
=== 2024 election ===
General election 2024: Lobatse
Party	Candidate	Votes	%	±%
UDC	Kamal Jacobs	6,872	66.35	+45.70
BDP	Pelotshweu Motlogelwa	2,699	26.06	−35.79
Independent	Mpoloka Pandor	445	4.30	N/A
BCP	Tebo Mooki	341	3.29	N/A
Margin of victory		4,173	40.29	N/A
Total valid votes		10,357	98.94	−0.25
Rejected ballots		111	1.06	+0.25
Turnout		10,468	80.85	−1.30
Registered electors		12,947		
UDC gain from BDP		Swing	+40.75	

=== 2019 election ===
General election 2019: Lobatse
Party	Candidate	Votes	%	±%
BDP	Thapelo Matsheka	6,705	61.85	+11.95
UDC	Orapeleng Kakoma	2,238	20.65	−24.80
Independent	Kamal Jacobs	1,413	13.04	N/A
AP	Shaffi Pandor	238	2.20	N/A
BMD	Nehemiah Modubule	166	1.53	−43.92
BPF	Kader Badat	40	0.37	N/A
Independent	Patrick Kebailele	40	0.37	N/A
Margin of victory		4,467	41.20	+36.75
Total valid votes		10,840	99.19	−0.02
Rejected ballots		88	0.81	+0.02
Turnout		10,928	82.15	−3.32
Registered electors		13,302		
BDP hold		Swing	+18.38	

=== 2014 election ===
General election 2014: Lobatse
Party	Candidate	Votes	%	±%
BDP	Sadique Kebonang	5,485	49.90	+8.33
UDC	Nehemiah Modubule	4,996	45.45	+2.70
BCP	Ellius Rantleru	511	4.65	−0.20
Margin of victory		489	4.45	N/A
Total valid votes		11,015	99.21	+1.23
Rejected ballots		88	0.79	−1.23
Turnout		11,103	85.47	+11.1
Registered electors		12,991		
BDP gain from UDC		Swing	+5.52	

=== 2009 election ===
General election 2009: Lobatse
Party	Candidate	Votes	%	±%
Independent	Nehemiah Modubule	4,175	42.75	−7.29
BDP	Moggie Mbaakanyi	4,060	41.57	+4.76
BNF	Otlaadisa Koosaletse	1,018	10.42	−39.62
BCP	Diane Taunyane	474	4.85	−2.17
BTTO	Kealeboga Modise	40	4.85	−0.13
Margin of victory		115	1.18	−12.05
Total valid votes		9,767	97.98	−0.69
Rejected ballots		201	2.02	+0.69
Turnout		9,968	74.37	+0.05
Registered electors		13,404		
Independent hold		Swing	−6.03	

=== 2004 election ===
General election 2004: Lobatse
Party	Candidate	Votes	%	±%
BNF	Nehemiah Modubule	4,173	50.04	−0.92
BDP	Moggie Mbaakanyi	3,070	36.81	−4.54
BCP	Otlaadisa Koosaletse	585	7.02	−0.16
NDF	Metlhaeno Gaseitsiwe	466	5.59	N/A
Independent	Kealeboga Modise	45	0.54	N/A
Margin of victory		1,103	13.23	+3.62
Total valid votes		8,339	98.67	+0.53
Rejected ballots		112	1.33	−0.53
Turnout		8,451	76.85	−3.53
Registered electors		10,997		
BNF hold		Swing	−2.73	

=== 1999 election ===
General election 1999: Lobatse
Party	Candidate	Votes	%	±%
BNF	Nehemiah Modubule	3,976	50.96	−5.28
BDP	Ishoo Abdulla	3,226	41.35	+2.78
BCP	Otlaadisa Koosaletse	560	7.18	−49.06
BAM	L. E. Serema	40	0.51	N/A
Margin of victory		750	9.61	−8.06
Total valid votes		7,802	98.14	N/A
Rejected ballots		148	1.86	N/A
Turnout		7,950	80.38	−0.73
Registered electors		9,891		
BNF gain from BCP		Swing	−4.03	

=== 1994 election ===
General election 1994: Lobatse
Party	Candidate	Votes	%
BNF	Otlaadisa Koosaletse	3,813	56.24
BDP	Ishoo Abdulla	2,615	38.57
PUSO	Nehemiah Modubule	265	3.91
IFP	M.E. Galetshoge	49	0.72
BPP	W. Kumbulani	38	0.56
Margin of victory		1,198	17.67
Turnout		6,780	81.11%
Registered electors		8,359	
BNF win (new seat)			
