= Malotwana Siding =

Village in Botswana

Coordinates: 24°17′42″S 26°10′3″E

Location of Malotwana Siding

Malotwana Siding is a village in Kgatleng District of Botswana. It is located 10 km north of Mochudi and the population was 354 in the 2001 census. There is currently one school, Boiteko primary school. Most of the people who live in this village are mere subsistent farmers.
