= Dumelang Saleshando =

Motswana politician (born 1971)

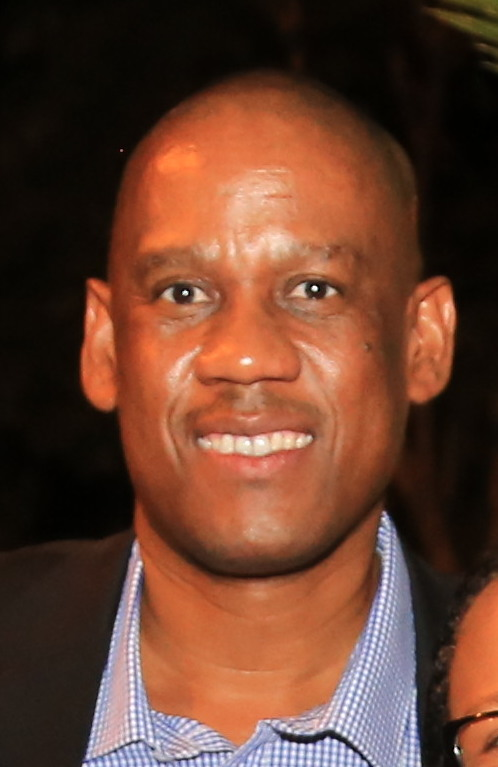

Leader of the Opposition
- Incumbent
- Assumed office 1 November 2024
- Preceded by: Dithapelo Keorapetse
- In office 5 November 2019 – 12 July 2022
- Preceded by: Duma Boko
- Succeeded by: Dithapelo Keorapetse
- In office 12 July 2012 – 24 October 2014
- Preceded by: Botsalo Ntuane
- Succeeded by: Duma Boko

Leader of the Botswana Congress Party
- Incumbent
- Assumed office 20 July 2010
- Preceded by: Gilson Saleshando

Member of Parliament for Maun North
- Incumbent
- Assumed office 30 October 2024
- Preceded by: Constituency established
- Majority: 5,707 (43.7%)

Member of Parliament for Maun West
- In office 23 October 2019 – 5 September 2024
- Preceded by: Tawana Moremi
- Succeeded by: Caterpillar Hikuama

Member of Parliament for Gaborone Central
- In office 30 October 2004 – 7 August 2014
- Preceded by: Margaret Nasha
- Succeeded by: Phenyo Butale

Personal details
- Born: 13 September 1971 (age 55) Selebi-Phikwe, Botswana
- Party: Botswana Congress Party
- Spouse: Dineo Saleshando

Dumelang Saleshando (born 13 September 1971) is a Motswana politician and economist who has served as the Leader of the Botswana Congress Party since 2010. Saleshando has been the Leader of the Opposition since November 2024. He also serves as MP for Maun North since 2024. Saleshando has served as Leader of the Opposition on three occasions, from 2012–2014, 2019–2022 and since 2024.

== Early life and education ==
Saleshando was born on 13 September 1971, is the firstborn of five sons to Gilson Saleshando, a politician, and Keatlaretse Dolly Saleshando, a nurse. He attended numerous schools growing up in Kanye, Lobatse, Selebi-Phikwe and was brought up in the Seventh-day Adventist Church. He completed his schooling at St Joseph's College, where he became a member of the Botswana Socialist Youth, before enrolling in a degree in economics and political science at the University of Botswana in 1992.

== Career ==
After university, Saleshando joined First National Bank Botswana as a trainee manager but he was summarily dismissed for leaking information about the finances of the ruling party. In 2003, Saleshando started campaigning for Gaborone Central parliamentary seat in the capital Gaborone. The seat was previously held by Michael Dingake, the former leader of Botswana Congress Party. Saleshando was elected to parliament as the Member of Parliament for Gaborone Central after defeating incumbent Hon Dr Margaret Nasha in 2004. He was re-elected as a Member of Parliament for the same constituency in the 2009 general elections and was elected party president unopposed in July 2010, after his father, Gilson Saleshando stepped down as party leader.

Prior to taking up the BCP leadership role, he served in the party Central Committee as Information and Publicity Secretary. His father was initially opposed to the idea of being succeeded by his son, noting that it was not proper since many people will believe that the party was run by a dynasty. He gave up when many people in the party endorsed the young Saleshando for the position. He lost the elections in the 2014 general elections to Phenyo Butale of the coalition Umbrella for Democratic Change under the Botswana Movement for Democracy.

== Personal life ==
Saleshando married Dineo in 2002 and they have two sons and a daughter. His son Seabo Saleshando plays tennis and ranked as one of Botswanas top players.
