= Independent Electoral Commission (Botswana) =

The Independent Electoral Commission (IEC) of Botswana is an independent electoral management body that was established in 1997 under current Section 65A of the Constitution by former President Ketumile Masire. It is intended to manage the fair conduct of parliamentary and local government elections and referendums. It does not have the power to delimit constituencies or determine election disputes.

The IEC is served by a Secretariat headed by the Secretary appointed by the President, in accordance with Section 66. As of 2024, the chairman is Hon. Justice Barnabas. The IEC relies on the government for its resources, including transport, finance, and staff.

== History ==
The IEC was created as a reaction to the opposition by the Botswana National Front, which opposed the primary elections of the Lobatse–Barolong constituency in 1984. After the 1997 national referendum, the IEC was enacted in June 1998.

In 1997, the Parliament passed the Constitutional (Amendment) Act 18/1997, which amended Section 66 and introduced a new section, 65A, establishing the IEC as an autonomous and non-partisan institution.
