= Pono Moatlhodi =

Botswana politician

Pono Moatlhodi is a politician from Botswana served as the former Deputy Speaker of the National Assembly. He is the BDP Member of Parliament for Tonota South. He was elected as an MP for the opposition party, Umbrella for Democratic Change (UDC) before he crossed the floor to rejoin the BDP in December 2020.
