= Leader of the Opposition (Botswana) =

Politician who leads the official opposition in Botswana

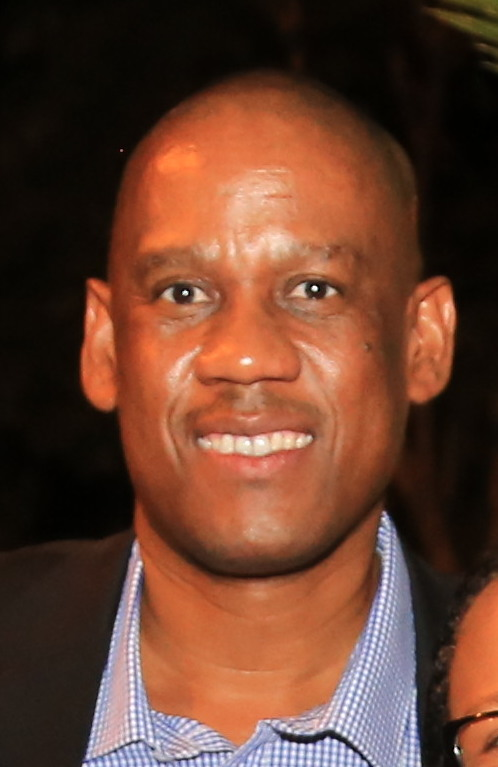
- Incumbent; Dumelang Saleshando since 1 November 2024
- Style: The Honourable
- Appointer: Largest political party in the National Assembly that is not in government
- Term length: While leader of the largest political party in the National Assembly that is not in government
- Inaugural holder: Philip Matante
- Formation: 3 March 1965
- Salary: P641,436

In Botswana, the Leader of the Opposition is the leader of the political party with the largest number of seats in the National Assembly that is not in the government. The position was created shortly before the independence of Botswana, after the first elections under universal suffrage in the then territory of Bechuanaland.

As in most countries that are governed under the Westminster parliamentary system, the leader of the Opposition is an elected member of the National Assembly who enjoys numerous particular prerogatives. They are considered the main spokesman for the majority opposition party in the National Assembly and has the right to make official statements in the National Assembly on important national and international issues on behalf of the majority opposition. They have longer speaking times than ordinary members during debates on the State of the Union Address, the Budget Address, or any other major government policy statement, and can be the first to respond to the State of the Nation address, budget speech, or any other major statement of government policy.

By virtue of his position, the leader of the Opposition is an ex officio member of two Parliamentary Committees: the Selection Committee and the Business Advisory Committees. He also holds the positions of Second Vice President of the Botswana Branch of the Commonwealth Parliamentary Association, Executive Member of the Southern African Development Community (SADC) Parliamentary Forum, and Executive Member of the Inter-Parliamentary Union Committee.

== List of the leaders of the opposition ==
No.	Leader		Period		Party
No.	Image	Name	Start	End	Party
1		Philip Matante (1912–1979)	3 March 1965	23 August 1969	Botswana People's Party
2		Bathoen Gaseitsiwe (1908–1990)	20 October 1969	20 July 1984	Botswana National Front
3		Kenneth Koma (1923–2007)	10 January 1985	1 August 2003	Botswana National Front
4		Nehemiah Modubule (born 1958)	1 August 2003	7 November 2005	Botswana National Front
5		Otsweletse Moupo	7 November 2005	21 August 2009	Botswana National Front
6		Olebile Gaborone (born 1947)	17 October 2009	5 August 2010	Botswana National Front
7		Botsalo Ntuane (born 1971)	5 August 2010	12 July 2012	Botswana Movement for Democracy
8		Dumelang Saleshando (born 1971)	12 July 2012	29 August 2014	Botswana Congress Party
9		Duma Boko (born 1969)	25 October 2014	28 August 2019	Botswana National Front
(8)		Dumelang Saleshando (born 1971)	5 November 2019	12 July 2022	Botswana Congress Party
10		Dithapelo Keorapetse (born 1982)	12 July 2022	1 November 2024	Independent (Note: Originally a member of the Botswana Congress Party (BCP), Keorapetse, along with four other BCP MPs, faced expulsion from the party in July 2022 for defying the BCP Central Committee. This defiance occurred when they ousted the BCP leader, Dumelang Saleshando, from the position of Leader of the Opposition. He served as an independent without aligning with a specific political party, although he remained affiliated with the UDC.)
(8)		Dumelang Saleshando (born 1971)	1 November 2024	Incumbent	Botswana Congress Party
