= 2009 Botswana general election =

- 16 October 2009

57 of the 63 seats in the National Assembly 29 seats needed for a majority
- Registered: 723,617
- Turnout: 76.71% (of registered voters) (▲0.51pp); 62.20% (of eligible population) (▲18.20pp) (Note: National Study On Voter Apathy in Botswana (PDF). University of Botswana. IEC Botswana. 2022. p. 17. Archived from the original (PDF) on 13 February 2025.)
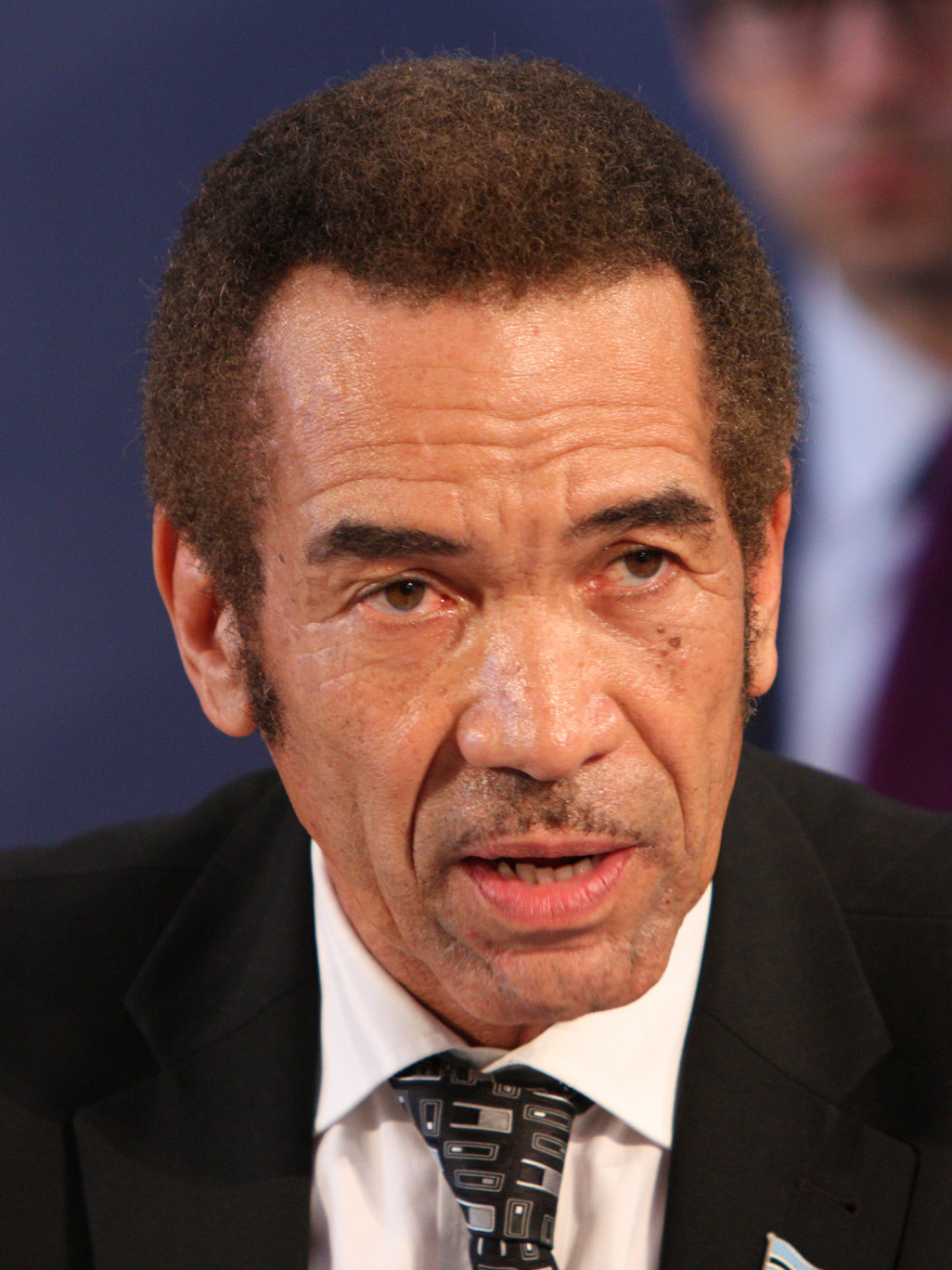

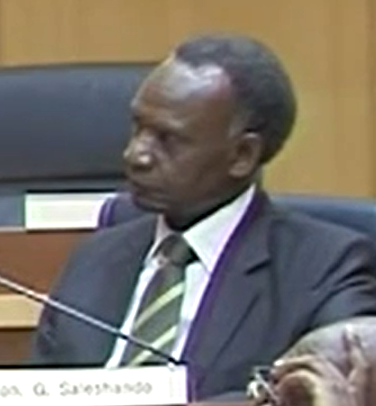
	First party	Second party	Third party
		BNF
Leader	Ian Khama	Otsweletse Moupo	Gilson Saleshando
Party	BDP	BNF	BCP
Leader's seat	None (Note: Incumbent presidents are ineligible to contest National Assembly seats; instead, they serve as ex-officio members of Parliament.)	Did not stand (Note: Lost renomination in Gaborone West North.)	Selebi-Phikwe West
Last election	51.73%, 44 seats	26.06%, 12 seats	16.62%, 1 seat
Seats won	45	6	4
Seat change	▲1	▼6	▲3
Popular vote	290,099	119,509	104,302
Percentage	53.26%	21.94%	19.15%
Swing	▲1.53pp	▼4.12pp	▲2.53pp
- Results by constituency
President before election
Ian Khama
BDP
Elected President
Ian Khama
BDP

General elections were held in Botswana on 16 October 2009, alongside local elections, with early voting in 26 polling stations abroad taking place on 3 October. The result was a tenth successive victory for the Botswana Democratic Party, which won 45 of the 57 elected seats in the National Assembly.

== Electoral system ==
The 57 directly-elected members of the National Assembly were elected in single-member constituencies. A further four members were elected from a list nominated by the President, whilst the President and the Attorney General became ex officio members.

== Campaign ==
The ruling BDP faced internal divisions leading up to the election, with President Ian Khama threatening to expel party leader and former cabinet minister Daniel Kwelagobe, who also led the rival Barata-Phathi faction within the BDP. Although Khama and Kwelagobe eventually reconciled, stability within the BDP remained in question. The BDP campaign focused on its record in government, including education, training and economic development.

Botswana National Front leader Otsweletse Moupo did not contest the elections after losing the party's primary elections for his Gaborone West North seat. Although it was speculated that he would stand for election in Gaborone South, Moupo ultimately declined to run. The BNF campaign centred around creating a strong civil society and improving social welfare and housing.

The Botswana Congress Party (BCP) and the Botswana Alliance Movement (BAM) formed an electoral alliance and supported each other's candidates. BCP leader Gilson Saleshando stood for election in Selebi-Phikwe West, a constituency held prior to the election by BDP candidate Kavis Kario. The alliance's campaign included a pledge to stop the economic downturn.

The Botswana People's Party (BPP) campaign focused on agricultural development and manufacturing, whilst the MELS Movement of Botswana (MELS) promised to fight the exploitation of the population.

A total of 177 candidates contested the elections; 57 from the BDP, 48 from the BNF, 46 from the BCP-BAM alliance (42 from the BCP and 4 from the BAM), 6 from the BPP, 4 from MELS, one from the Botswana Tlhoko Tiro Organisation and 15 independents.

== Opinion polls ==
Very few scientific opinion polls were taken prior to the election, preventing accurate measures of public sentiment.

Date	Institute	BDP	BNF	BCP	Other/none
28 Sept – 16 Oct 2008	University of Botswana Faculty / Afrobarometer	63%	13%	8%	10%

== Conduct ==
Early voting was planned for police and polling officers on 29 September, as they would be unable to vote on election day. However, because of a printing error at the Johannesburg-based printer that was responsible for printing the ballot papers, early voting could not proceed as planned; ballot numbers, which should be unique to counter election fraud, were sometimes repeated on the ballots for local elections. As a result Police officers and polling officers had to vote on 16 October, along with the general public. For officers stationed far away from the place they are registered to vote, this presented serious problems. The BCP threatened legal action against the Independent Electoral Commission.

Election turnout was reported to be high with polling station opening times being extending to cope with large queues. Election observers stated that the overall process ran smoothly, although in some instance people had been unable to vote. The Southern African Development Community noted that the elections were "credible, peaceful, free and fair", but raised concerns about the "slow polling process".

== Results ==
Party	Votes	%	Seats	+/–
Botswana Democratic Party	290,099	53.26	45	+1
Botswana National Front	119,509	21.94	6	–6
Botswana Congress Party	104,302	19.15	4	+3
Botswana Alliance Movement	12,387	2.27	1	+1
Botswana People's Party	7,554	1.39	0	0
MELS Movement of Botswana	292	0.05	0	0
Tlhoko Tiro Organisation	40	0.01	0	New
Independents	10,464	1.92	1	+1
Indirectly-elected seats			6	0
Total	544,647	100.00	63	0
Valid votes	544,647	98.12		
Invalid/blank votes	10,431	1.88		
Total votes	555,078	100.00		
Registered voters/turnout	723,617	76.71		
Source: EISA

Nehemiah Modubule, MP for Lobatse, won re-election running as an independent, having been elected in 2004 as a BNF candidate.

== Aftermath ==
The BDP held a victory rally in Gaborone on 18 October, and President Khama was sworn in for his first full term on 20 October.

== See also ==
- List of members of the National Assembly of Botswana 2009–2014
