= 2004 Botswana general election =

- 30 October 2004

57 of the 63 seats in the National Assembly 29 seats needed for a majority
- Registered: 552,849
- Turnout: 76.20% (of registered voters) (▼0.91pp); 44.00% (of eligible population) (▲2.02pp) (Note: National Study On Voter Apathy in Botswana (PDF). University of Botswana. IEC Botswana. 2022. p. 17.)
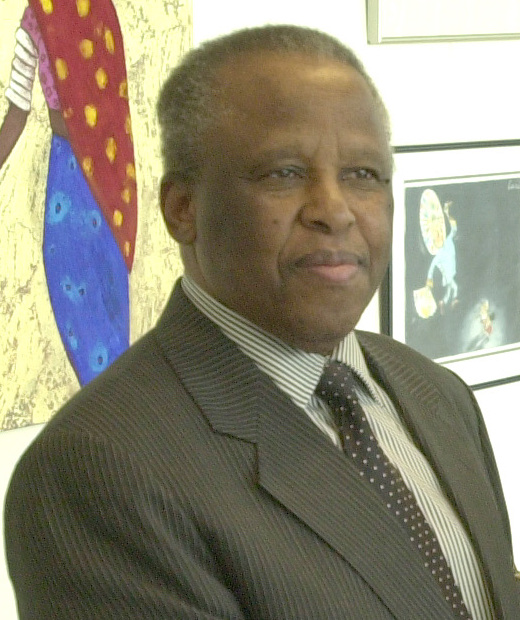
	First party	Second party	Third party
		BNF	BCP
Leader	Festus Mogae	Otsweletse Moupo	Otlaadisa Koosaletse
Party	BDP	BNF	BCP
Leader's seat	None (Note: Incumbent presidents are ineligible to contest National Assembly seats; instead, they serve as ex-officio members of Parliament.)	Selebi-Phikwe West (defeated)	Lobatse (defeated)
Last election	57.15%, 33 seats	25.95%, 6 seats	11.90%, 1 seats
Seats won	44	12	1
Seat change	▲11	▲6	0
Popular vote	213,308	107,451	68,556
Percentage	51.73%	26.06%	16.62%
Swing	▼5.42pp	▲0.11pp	▲4.72pp
- Results by constituency
President before election
Festus Mogae
BDP
Elected President
Festus Mogae
BDP

General elections were held in Botswana on 30 October 2004, alongside local elections. The result was a ninth consecutive victory for the ruling Botswana Democratic Party (BDP), which won 44 of the 57 seats in the National Assembly.

== Background ==
The Independent Electoral Commission launched a campaign to encourage voter registration, with a target of registering at least 500,000 voters. Although it achieved its target, registering around 61% of the estimated 900,000 voting-age population, the opposition Botswana National Front (BNF) accused it of making errors in the registration process.

== Campaign ==
For the first time, the election campaign involved parties using billboards. However, the opposition claimed that their media access was restricted, and a study by the Media Institute of Southern Africa showed that the BDP had received over 50% of the election coverage. The BDP campaigned on promises to improve training, expand electricity and water supplies and amend laws that discriminated against women. The campaign of the opposition parties focused on unemployment and poverty. However, although the BNF, Botswana Alliance Movement (BAM) and Botswana People's Party (BPP), entered into an electoral pact agreement in 2003, their campaigns were marked by open personal attacks between them and their leaders.

Fifty-six of the 57 constituencies were contested, with Vice President Ian Khama unopposed in the Serowe North constituency.

== Conduct ==
For the first time, international monitors were able to observe the elections, with delegations from the Southern African Development Community, the African Union, the Commonwealth and the United Nations in attendance. There were 11,000 personnel from the Independent Electoral Commission involved in running the elections.

== Results ==
Party	Votes	%	Seats	+/–
Botswana Democratic Party	213,308	51.73	44	+11
Botswana National Front	107,451	26.06	12	+6
Botswana Congress Party	68,556	16.62	1	0
Botswana Alliance Movement	11,716	2.84	0	0
Botswana People's Party	7,886	1.91	0	New
New Democratic Front	3,237	0.78	0	New
MELS Movement of Botswana	121	0.03	0	0
Independents	104	0.03	0	0
Indirectly-elected seats			6	+2
Total	412,379	100.00	63	+19
Valid votes	412,379	97.89		
Invalid/blank votes	8,893	2.11		
Total votes	421,272	100.00		
Registered voters/turnout	552,849	76.20		
Source: African Elections Database
