= Member of Parliament (Botswana) =

Representative in the National Assembly of Botswana

In Botswana, a Member of Parliament (MP) is an individual elected to serve in the National Assembly of the Parliament of Botswana.

== Electoral system ==
61 out of the 69 members of the National Assembly are elected using the first-past-the-post voting system in single member constituencies across the country, where each constituency has its own single representative. 6 out of 69 members are specially-elected MPs, nominated and confirmed by the National Assembly. In effect, they serve as a way for the majority party to increase its number of seats in the assembly.

== Elections ==
All MP positions become simultaneously vacant for elections held on a five-year cycle, or when a snap election is called. If a vacancy arises at another time, due to death or resignation, then a constituency vacancy may be filled by a by-election.

== Vacancy ==
According to the Constitution of Botswana, a seat will become vacant if:

1. Parliament is dissolved.
2. The member is absent from Assembly sittings for a prescribed period (at least two consecutive sessions of Parliament).
3. If a member is declared insolvent, adjudged to be of unsound mind, sentenced to death or imprisonment, or convicted of an election offense, they will cease to perform their functions immediately.

However, they will not vacate their seat until 30 days after the decision, during which they can appeal the decision. The Speaker can grant extensions of 30 days for the member to pursue an appeal, with a maximum total extension of 150 days, subject to the approval of the Assembly.

If, after the appeal process, the circumstances leading to disqualification continue and no further appeal is available, or if the time for entering an appeal expires or the leave to appeal is refused, the member must vacate their seat.

If the circumstances leading to disqualification cease to exist before the member vacates their seat, the seat will not become vacant, and the member can resume their functions in the Assembly.

== Eligibility ==
To be eligible to stand as an MP, candidates have to be citizens of Botswana, at least 18 years old, without an undischarged bankruptcy and be able to speak and read English sufficiently well to take part in parliamentary proceedings. They must also obtain a nomination from at least two voters in their constituency and the support of seven. A deposit is required, which is refunded if the candidate receives at least 5% of the vote in the constituency.

== Title ==
Members of Parliament are entitled to use the post-nominal initials MP. MPs are only referred to as "honourable" as a courtesy during debates in the National Assembly (e.g., "the honourable member for ...").

== See also ==
- 13th Parliament of Botswana
