= Second Masisi cabinet =

Government of Botswana from 2019 to 2024

- 16th Cabinet of Botswana

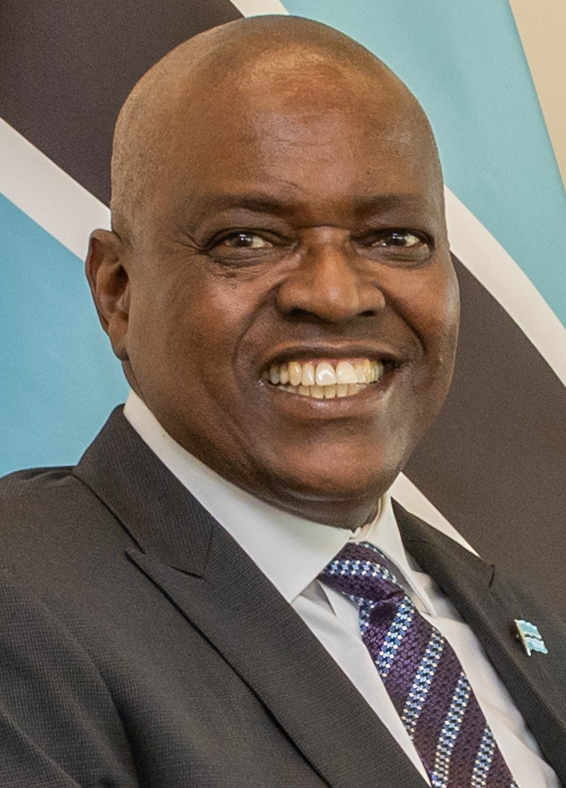
- Masisi in 2023
- Date formed: 1 November 2019
- Date dissolved: 1 November 2024

People and organisations
- President: Mokgweetsi Masisi
- Vice-President: Slumber Tsogwane
- No. of ministers: 20
- Ministers removed: 6
- Total no. of members: 30 (including 10 assistant ministers)
- Member parties: Botswana Democratic Party
- Status in legislature: Majority government
- Opposition party: Umbrella for Democratic Change
- Opposition leader: Dumelang Saleshando (2019–2022); Dithapelo Keorapetse (2022–2024)

History
- Election: 2019 general election
- Legislature term: 12th Parliament
- Predecessor: Masisi I
- Successor: Boko cabinet

The second Masisi cabinet was the sixteenth government of Botswana headed by President Mokgweetsi Masisi after the Botswana Democratic Party (BDP) formed a majority government following its victory at the general election held on 23 October 2019.

Masisi began his elected presidential term on 1 November and appointed a new ministry on 6 November, comprising 18 ministers and eight assistant ministers. Slumber Tsogwane was retained as vice-president. The administration ended with the accession of Duma Boko to the presidency on 1 November 2024, after the BDP lost power for the first time since independence at the 2024 Botswana general election.

During its five years in office, the cabinet oversaw Botswana's response to the COVID-19 pandemic, an economic recovery programme, changes to public administration and negotiations with De Beers over the country's principal diamond-mining partnership. Its membership changed through appointments and transfers in 2020 and 2021, the replacement of ministers in early 2022, and a major reorganisation of ministerial responsibilities in April 2022. Further changes in 2024 followed the departure of environment minister Philda Kereng, the death of her successor Dumezweni Mthimkhulu and the dismissal of health minister Edwin Dikoloti.

The cabinet was the last BDP administration in an uninterrupted period of government extending from Botswana's independence in 1966. The party's defeat was attributed to a combination of economic difficulties, dissatisfaction with governance and divisions arising from candidate selection within the BDP.

== Background and formation ==
=== From the Khama presidency to the 2019 election ===
Masisi succeeded Ian Khama as president after Khama reached his term limit and the first Masisi cabinet was formed on 1 April 2018. The transition preceded what would be a public rift between Masisi and Khama; Khama subsequently supported the breakaway Botswana Patriotic Front (BPF). The two leaders' conflict was an important element of the political setting of the 2019 election. The personal and party rivalry subsequently complicated Masisi's constitutional-reform programme and the direction of the state.

Defying the odds against him, the BDP retained its majority, winning 38 of the 57 directly elected National Assembly seats at the general election on 23 October 2019. The Umbrella for Democratic Change (UDC) won 15 seats, the BPF three and the Alliance for Progressives one. Masisi's new presidential term began with his inauguration and oath-taking on 1 November.

The first sitting of the new National Assembly took place on 5 November, when Tsogwane's selection as vice-president was endorsed. On 6 November, the Office of the President published the names of 18 ministers and eight assistant ministers and stated that the appointments took immediate effect. The new ministry retained only three ministers from the preceding cabinet: Unity Dow, Eric Molale and Kefentse Mzwinila.

== Composition ==
=== Cabinet members ===
Second Masisi Cabinet
Portfolio	Minister	Took office	Left office	Party
Office of the President
President	Mokgweetsi Masisi	1 November 2019	1 November 2024	BDP
Vice-President	Slumber Tsogwane	6 November 2019	1 November 2024	BDP
Minister for State President	Kabo Morwaeng	6 November 2019	1 November 2024	BDP
Ministry of Defence and Security
Minister of Defence and Security	Kagiso Mmusi	6 November 2019	1 November 2024	BDP
Ministry of Foreign Affairs
Minister of Foreign Affairs	Unity Dow	6 November 2019	26 August 2020	Specially-elected
Minister of Foreign Affairs	Lemogang Kwape	26 August 2020	1 November 2024	BDP
Ministry of Finance
Minister of Finance	Thapelo Matsheka	6 November 2019	18 April 2021	BDP
Minister of Finance	Peggy Serame	18 April 2021	1 November 2024	Specially-elected
Ministry of Health
Minister of Health	Lemogang Kwape	6 November 2019	26 August 2020	BDP
Minister of Health	Edwin Dikoloti	26 August 2020	27 September 2024	BDP
Minister of Health	Sethomo Lelatisitswe	27 September 2024	1 November 2024	BDP
Ministry of Local Government and Rural Development
Minister of Local Government and Rural Development	Eric Molale	6 November 2019	25 January 2022	BDP
Minister of Local Government and Rural Development	Kgotla Autlwetse	25 January 2022	1 November 2024	Specially-elected
Ministry of Lands and Water Affairs
Minister of Lands and Water Affairs	Kefentse Mzwinila	6 November 2019	1 November 2024	Specially-elected
Ministry of Agriculture
Minister of Agriculture	Edwin Dikoloti	6 November 2019	26 August 2020	BDP
Minister of Agriculture	Karabo Gare	26 August 2020	22 April 2022	BDP
Minister of Agriculture	Fidelis Molao	22 April 2022	1 November 2024	BDP
Ministry of Education and Skills Development
Minister of Basic Education (position abolished)	Fidelis Molao	6 November 2019	22 April 2022	BDP
Minister of Education and Skills Development	Douglas Letsholathebe	6 November 2019	1 November 2024	BDP
Ministry of Environment and Tourism
Minister of Environment and Tourism	Philda Kereng	6 November 2019	30 January 2024	Specially-elected
Minister of Environment and Tourism	Dumezweni Mthimkhulu	26 February 2024	2 September 2024	BDP
Minister of Environment and Tourism	Nnaniki Makwinja	9 September 2024	1 November 2024	BDP
Ministry of Minerals and Energy
Minister of Minerals and Energy	Lefoko Moagi	6 November 2019	1 November 2024	BDP
Ministry of Communications, Knowledge and Technology
Minister of Communications, Knowledge and Technology	Thulagano Segokgo	6 November 2019	1 November 2024	BDP
Ministry of Transport and Public Works
Minister of Transport and Public Works	Mmusi Kgafela	6 November 2019	18 April 2021	BDP
Minister of Transport and Public Works	Thapelo Matsheka	18 April 2021	25 January 2022	BDP
Minister of Transport and Public Works	Eric Molale	25 January 2022	1 November 2024	BDP
Ministry of Labour and Home Affairs
Minister of Labour and Home Affairs	Annah Mokgethi	6 November 2019	1 November 2024	BDP
Minister of Employment, Labour Productivity and Skills Development (position abolished)	Mpho Balopi	6 November 2019	24 December 2021	BDP
Minister of Employment, Labour Productivity and Skills Development (position abolished)	Machana Shamukuni	25 January 2022	22 April 2022	BDP
Ministry of Justice
Minister of Justice	Machana Shamukuni	22 April 2022	1 November 2024	BDP
Ministry of Youth, Gender, Sport and Culture
Minister of Youth, Gender, Sport and Culture	Tumiso Rakgare	6 November 2019	1 November 2024	BDP
Ministry of Trade and Industry
Minister of Trade and Industry	Peggy Serame	6 November 2019	18 April 2021	Specially-elected
Minister of Trade and Industry	Mmusi Kgafela	18 April 2021	1 November 2024	BDP
Ministry of Entrepreneurship
Minister of Entrepreneurship	Karabo Gare	22 April 2022	1 November 2024	BDP

=== Assistant ministers ===
Assistant ministers
Portfolio	Minister	Took office	Left office	Party
Office of the President
Assistant Minister for State President	Dumezweni Mthimkhulu	6 November 2019	26 February 2024	BDP
Assistant Minister for State President	Boitumelo Gofhamodimo	26 February 2024	1 November 2024	Specially-elected
Ministry of Health
Assistant Minister of Health	Sethomo Lelatisitswe	6 November 2019	27 September 2024	BDP
Ministry of Local Government and Rural Development
Assistant Minister of Local Government and Rural Development	Kgotla Autlwetse	6 November 2019	25 January 2022	Specially-elected
Assistant Minister of Local Government and Rural Development	Setlhabelo Modukanele	6 November 2019	1 November 2024	BDP
Assistant Minister of Local Government and Rural Development	Talita Monnakgotla	25 January 2022	1 November 2024	BDP
Assistant Minister of Local Government and Rural Development	Mabuse Pule	6 July 2021	1 November 2024	BDP
Ministry of Agriculture
Assistant Minister of Agriculture	Beauty Manake	6 November 2019	25 January 2022	Specially-elected
Assistant Minister of Agriculture	Molebatsi Molebatsi	25 January 2022	1 November 2024	BDP
Ministry of Education and Skills Development
Assistant Minister of Education and Skills Development	Nnaniki Makwinja	6 November 2019	9 September 2024	BDP
Assistant Minister of Education and Skills Development	Aubrey Lesaso	25 January 2022	1 November 2024	BDP
Ministry of Youth, Gender, Sport and Culture
Assistant Minister of Youth, Gender, Sport and Culture	Buti Billy	6 November 2019	1 November 2024	BDP
Ministry of Trade and Industry
Assistant Minister of Trade and Industry	Karabo Gare	6 November 2019	26 August 2020	BDP
Assistant Minister of Trade and Industry	Molebatsi Molebatsi	26 August 2020	25 January 2022	BDP
Assistant Minister of Trade and Industry	Beauty Manake	25 January 2022	1 November 2024	Specially-elected

== Ministerial changes and reorganisation ==
=== Changes in 2020 and 2021 ===
On 26 August 2020, Masisi removed Unity Dow as Minister of International Affairs and Co-operation. Lemogang Kwape, previously responsible for health and wellness, moved to foreign affairs, while Edwin Dikoloti moved from agriculture to health. Karabo Gare, who had been an assistant minister in investment, trade and industry, was promoted to the agriculture ministry. The Daily Maverick connected the reshuffle to strains within the ruling party. A second reshuffle was announced on 18 April 2021. Peggy Serame was moved from investment, trade and industry to finance and economic development, replacing Thapelo Matsheka, who took over infrastructure and housing development. Mmusi Kgafela was moved from infrastructure to investment, trade and industry. Mpho Balopi resigned as Minister of Employment, Labour Productivity and Skills Development on 24 December 2021.

=== Changes and reorganisation of government 2022 ===
On 25 January 2022, Kgotla Autlwetse and Machana Shamukuni were sworn in as ministers of local government and employment respectively; Talita Monnakgotla and Aubrey Lesaso were sworn in as assistant ministers. Eric Molale replaced Matsheka as the minister responsible for infrastructure and housing development on the same day.

On 21 April 2022, Masisi announced a rationalisation of the machinery of government. The new assignments were recorded in Government Notice No. 245 of 2022 in the Extraordinary Government Gazette issued on 22 April. The notice replaced the earlier ministerial portfolio arrangements in Government Notice No. 691 of 2018. The reorganised government retained 18 ministerial portfolios but shifted their boundaries. The Ministry of Justice was separated from defence and security; the ministries of basic and tertiary education were consolidated into education and skills development; transport was combined with public works; and a Ministry of Entrepreneurship was established. Several other ministries received revised titles, including the Ministry for State President and the Ministry of Communications, Knowledge and Technology.

The ministerial allocation visible in May 2022 placed Shamukuni at Justice, Fidelis Molao at Agriculture, Douglas Letsholathebe at Education and Skills Development, Karabo Gare at Entrepreneurship and Molale at Transport and Public Works. The former nationality, immigration and gender portfolio was reorganised into Labour and Home Affairs under Anna Mokgethi while Tumiso Rakgare's youth and culture ministry gained responsibility for gender affairs. The reforms were presented by the President as part of the government's "Reset Agenda", which sought to align ministerial responsibilities, state-owned enterprises and public administration with its recovery and development priorities.

=== Final-year changes ===
Philda Kereng departed the environment and tourism ministry on 30 2024 after being designated as High Commissioner to Nigeria. Dumezweni Mthimkhulu, previously an assistant minister in the Presidency, was appointed to succeed her on 26 February. He died on 2 September, and Nnaniki Makwinja, previously an assistant minister in education, was sworn in as the new environment and tourism minister on 9 September.

A further change occurred on 27 September, when Masisi dismissed Edwin Dikoloti from the health portfolio and appointed his former assistant minister, Sethomo Lelatisitswe. Dikoloti's removal took place amid a dispute over the BDP's selection of a parliamentary candidate for Goodhope-Mmathethe; he subsequently contested the 2024 election as an independent. His dismissal was linked to his legal challenge against the party's decision to appoint Serame as the BDP parliamentary candidate.

== Governmental record ==
=== COVID-19 pandemic and economic policy ===
The COVID-19 pandemic posed the administration's first major national crisis. The government introduced a public emergency in April 2020, with restrictions on movement, commercial activity and public gatherings, alongside food assistance and wage-support measures. The extraordinary restrictions and public emergency continued, in modified forms, until September 2021. Masisi later described the response and the subsequent economic programme as central elements of his Reset Agenda.

The pandemic had a substantial economic impact on Botswana, given the country's dependence on diamond exports and contact-intensive services. The International Monetary Fund estimated that real output fell by 7.9 per cent in 2020, while unemployment reached 24.5 per cent in the final quarter of that year. It commended measures intended to limit the social and economic consequences of the crisis but also identified structural weaknesses, including the need to diversify exports and improve employment opportunities. The "Economic Recovery and Transformation Plan", approved by Parliament in July 2020, became a central organising document for the cabinet's economic programme.

The emergency measures generated disputes over executive authority and civil liberties. Freedom House recorded restrictions on strikes and the dissemination of pandemic-related information, as well as criticism that the executive had received excessive power. In their contemporary assessment, Makgala and Malila related the pandemic emergency to longer-running concerns about Botswana's concentration of power in the presidency. Those criticisms coexisted with the public-health rationale for the restrictions and the government's economic-support measures.

The subsequent "Reset Agenda" identified public-health recovery, the organisation of government, digitalisation, value-chain development and changes in attitudes and working practices as priorities. The April 2022 reorganisation was explicitly presented as an administrative means of implementing these commitments. Government statements described the consolidation of departments and restructuring of state-owned enterprises as measures intended to reduce overlapping responsibilities.

=== Motion of no confidence ===
On 29 November 2021, Leader of the Opposition Dumelang Saleshando tabled a motion of no confidence. Saleshando accused President Masisi of mismanagement, abuse of executive authority during the COVID-19 pandemic and failing to uphold his constitutional obligations. The government opposed the motion, with Minister for Presidential Affairs Kabo Morwaeng disputing its grounds.

14 December 2021; Vote of no confidence in the Masisi government Motion proposed by Dumelang Saleshando MP
Ballot →	14 December 2021
Required majority →	33/64
Aye	19 / 64
No	45 / 64
Abstentions	0 / 64
Absentees	0 / 64
Result: Motion defeated

=== Diamond industry and public finances ===
The cabinet negotiated new terms for Botswana's relationship with De Beers, the principal partner in the jointly owned diamond producer Debswana. On 30 June 2023, the parties announced an agreement in principle providing for a new ten-year sales agreement, extension of mining licences through 2054 and an increase in the portion of Debswana's rough production sold through the state-owned Okavango Diamond Company. Heads of terms were subsequently signed in October 2023. The proposed sales terms envisaged an initial increase from 25 to 30 per cent, rising to 50 per cent over the following decade, as well as a diamond-funded development initiative.

The negotiated arrangements had not, however, been concluded as fully executed long-term contracts by the end of Masisi's presidency. The IMF reported in 2024 that the final agreement was still expected to be signed; the agreement's completion was subsequently pursued by the Boko government. The collapse in diamond demand in 2023–2024 placed additional pressure on government revenue and on the administration's economic objectives.

=== Conservation and external relations ===
Wildlife conservation and regulated hunting also formed part of the cabinet's external relations. A ban on hunting, imposed in 2014, had been lifted by Masisi in 2019. The government defended controlled hunting as a means of managing conflict between elephants and rural communities and providing economic benefits from conservation. In March 2024, environment minister Mthimkhulu visited European capitals to argue against proposals to restrict imports of hunting trophies. Masisi's subsequent public offer to send 20,000 elephants to Germany drew international attention to the dispute.

=== Constitutional reform ===
The administration initiated a constitutional review and introduced constitutional amendments following recommendations from its review process. The proposed Constitution (Amendment) Bill, 2024 failed to secure the constitutionally required two-thirds majority in the National Assembly in September 2024. Opposition members left the chamber before the vote; 37 government members supported the bill, one voted against and two did not vote. The cabinet therefore left office without securing the proposed amendments.

The constitutional-review process attracted criticism over the way commissioners were selected, the scope of public consultation and the proposed changes. Masisi's relationship with Khama and the presidency's constitutional powers were seen as significant obstacles to Masisi's initially promised reforms. Freedom House also recorded concerns over the effectiveness of anti-corruption institutions and the transparency of public procurement, including during the pandemic. These disputes were among wider concerns about public accountability, state resources and the governing party's relationship with independent institutions.

== Electoral defeat and succession ==
The 2024 general election took place on 30 October following the dissolution of the 12th Parliament in September. The Umbrella for Democratic Change won 36 of the 61 directly elected seats, the Botswana Congress Party 15, the Botswana Patriotic Front five, the Botswana Democratic Party four and an independent candidate (Edwin Dikoloti) one. Masisi conceded defeat on 1 November 2024 and the BDP ended its continuous national administration since 1965. Boko assumed the presidency later that day at 5:35 pm and progressively constituted his government over the next days.
