= First Masisi cabinet =

Government of Botswana from 2018 to 2019

- 15th Cabinet of Botswana

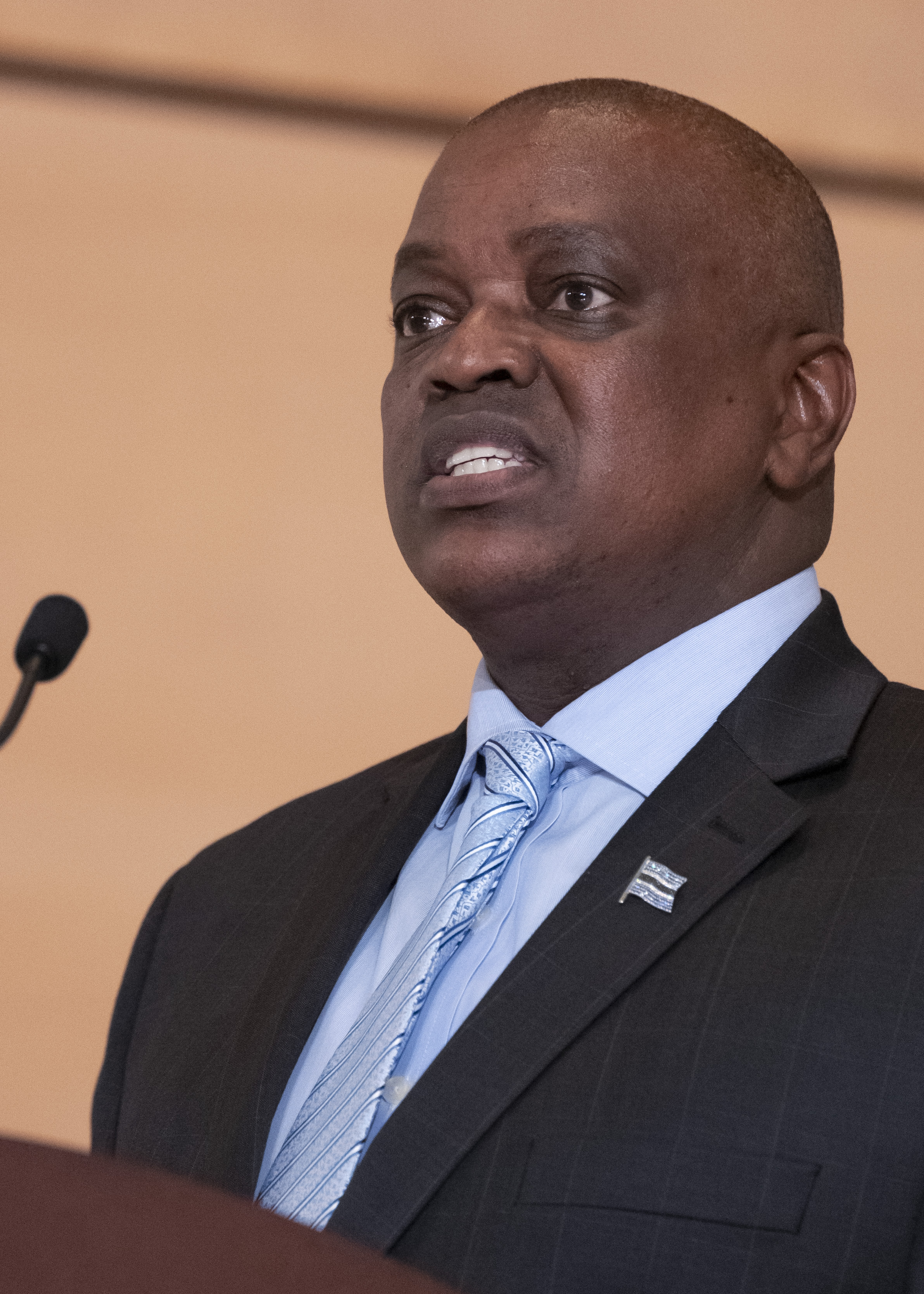
- Masisi in 2018
- Date formed: 1 April 2018
- Date dissolved: 1 November 2019

People and organisations
- President: Mokgweetsi Masisi
- Vice-President: Slumber Tsogwane
- No. of ministers: 20
- Ministers removed: 3
- Total no. of members: 30 (including 10 assistant ministers)
- Member parties: Botswana Democratic Party
- Status in legislature: Majority government
- Opposition party: Umbrella for Democratic Change
- Opposition leader: Duma Boko

History
- Election: 2014 general election
- Legislature term: 11th Parliament
- Predecessor: Khama III
- Successor: Masisi II

The first Masisi cabinet was the fifteenth government of Botswana, led by President Mokgweetsi Masisi of the Botswana Democratic Party (BDP) from 1 April 2018 to 1 November 2019. It was formed when Masisi, previously Vice-President, succeeded Ian Khama at the end of Khama's ten years in office. The change in leadership took place during the 11th Parliament, elected in 2014.

Masisi appointed a ministry consisting of 18 ministers, with 10 assistant ministers. Slumber Tsogwane was subsequently endorsed as Vice-President by the National Assembly and sworn in on 4 April. The composition of the cabinet changed through a reciprocal transfer of two ministers in June 2018, a five-portfolio reshuffle in December, the dismissal of Pelonomi Venson-Moitoi later that month and appointments in May 2019. Tshekedi Khama, the former president's brother, left the government in September 2019.

The administration governed during a widening dispute between Masisi and his predecessor, including disagreements about appointments and the direction of the BDP. Among the issues addressed during its tenure were executive accountability, public-sector pay, electoral administration and the lifting of a prohibition on hunting. The government survived a parliamentary motion of no confidence in July 2018. It ended when Masisi began a new presidential term after the BDP won the general election of 23 October 2019; a substantially reconstituted second Masisi cabinet was announced on 6 November.

== Background and formation ==
=== Succession to the presidency ===
Masisi had served as Vice-President under Ian Khama since November 2014. On 1 April 2018, Khama relinquished office at the completion of the constitutionally prescribed maximum of ten years and Masisi succeeded him. The BDP, which had won 37 of the 57 directly elected National Assembly seats at the 2014 election, retained its parliamentary majority; no new general election was held to effect the presidential succession. The succession followed the BDP's established practice of transferring the presidency to a sitting vice-president between elections. Although Masisi had served in Khama's administration, observers identified differences in their approaches to economic policy, the exercise of presidential authority and the governing party's internal leadership. These differences became a central feature of the ensuing 2019 election campaign.

=== Appointment of the ministry ===
Masisi's government was formally constituted with appointments taking effect on 1 April 2018. In an announcement published on 4 April, Permanent Secretary to the President Carter Morupisi identified 18 ministerial portfolios and 10 assistant-minister posts. Nonofo Molefhi was appointed to Presidential Affairs, Shaw Kgathi to Defence, Justice and Security, Kenneth Matambo to Finance and Economic Development, and Vincent Seretse to International Affairs and Co-operation. Unity Dow was assigned Infrastructure and Housing Development and Bogolo Kenewendo became Minister of Investment, Trade and Industry. The cabinet retained several ministers who had served under Khama, while also reallocating portfolios and introducing new members.

The vice-presidency became vacant when Masisi succeeded Khama. Masisi nominated Slumber Tsogwane, a former minister of local government and long-serving BDP MP for Boteti West, to succeed him. The National Assembly endorsed Tsogwane on 4 April by 35 votes to one, with other members abstaining, not voting or absent. Tsogwane then took the oath of office. His selection, rather than that of former president Khama's younger brother Tshekedi, later emerged as a point of contention between the two political leaders.

== Composition ==
=== Cabinet members ===
First Masisi cabinet
Portfolio	Minister	Took office	Left office	Party
Office of the President
President	Mokgweetsi Masisi	1 April 2018	1 November 2019	BDP
Vice-President	Slumber Tsogwane	4 April 2018	1 November 2019	BDP
Minister of Presidential Affairs, Governance and Public Administration	Nonofo Molefhi	1 April 2018	1 November 2019	BDP
Ministry of Defence, Justice and Security
Minister of Defence, Justice and Security	Shaw Kgathi	30 October 2014	1 November 2019	BDP
Ministry of Finance and Economic Development
Minister of Finance and Economic Development	Kenneth Matambo	21 October 2009	1 November 2019	Specially-elected
Ministry of International Affairs and Co-operation
Minister of International Affairs and Co-operation	Vincent Seretse	1 April 2018	20 June 2018	BDP
Minister of International Affairs and Co-operation	Unity Dow	20 June 2018	1 November 2019	Specially-elected
Ministry of Infrastructure and Housing Development
Minister of Infrastructure and Housing Development	Unity Dow	1 April 2018	20 June 2018	Specially-elected
Minister of Infrastructure and Housing Development	Vincent Seretse	20 June 2018	1 November 2019	BDP
Ministry of Agricultural Development and Food Security
Minister of Agricultural Development and Food Security	Patrick Ralotsia	21 April 2015	9 May 2019	BDP
Minister of Agricultural Development and Food Security	Fidelis Molao	9 May 2019	1 November 2019	BDP
Ministry of Basic Education
Minister of Basic Education	Bagalatia Arone	1 April 2018	1 November 2019	BDP
Ministry of Tertiary Education, Research, Science and Technology
Minister of Tertiary Education, Research, Science and Technology	Ngaka Ngaka	1 April 2018	14 December 2018	BDP
Minister of Tertiary Education, Research, Science and Technology	Thapelo Olopeng	14 December 2018	1 November 2019	BDP
Ministry of Health and Wellness
Minister of Health and Wellness	Alfred Madigele	1 April 2018	1 November 2019	BDP
Ministry of Local Government and Rural Development
Minister of Local Government and Rural Development	Pelonomi Venson-Moitoi	1 April 2018	19 December 2018	BDP
Minister of Local Government and Rural Development	Frans van der Westhuizen	19 December 2018	1 November 2019	BDP
Ministry of Land Management, Water and Sanitation Services
Minister of Land Management, Water and Sanitation Services	Kefentse Mzwinila	1 April 2018	1 November 2019	BDP
Ministry of Environment, Natural Resources Conservation and Tourism
Minister of Environment, Natural Resources Conservation and Tourism	Tshekedi Khama	2 October 2012	14 December 2018	BDP
Minister of Environment, Natural Resources Conservation and Tourism	Kitso Mokaila	14 December 2018	1 November 2019	Specially-elected
Ministry of Mineral Resources, Green Technology and Energy Security
Minister of Mineral Resources, Green Technology and Energy Security	Eric Molale	1 April 2018	1 November 2019	Specially-elected
Ministry of Investment, Trade and Industry
Minister of Investment, Trade and Industry	Bogolo Kenewendo	1 April 2018	1 November 2019	Specially-elected
Ministry of Transport and Communications
Minister of Transport and Communications	Kitso Mokaila	1 October 2016	14 December 2018	Specially-elected
Minister of Transport and Communications	Dorcas Makgato	14 December 2018	1 November 2019	BDP
Ministry of Employment, Labour Productivity and Skills Development
Minister of Employment, Labour Productivity and Skills Development	Tshenolo Mabeo	1 October 2016	1 November 2019	BDP
Ministry of Nationality, Immigration and Gender Affairs
Minister of Nationality, Immigration and Gender Affairs	Dorcas Makgato	1 April 2018	14 December 2018	BDP
Minister of Nationality, Immigration and Gender Affairs	Ngaka Ngaka	14 December 2018	1 November 2019	BDP
Ministry of Youth Empowerment, Sport and Culture Development
Minister of Youth Empowerment, Sport and Culture Development	Thapelo Olopeng	30 October 2014	14 December 2018	BDP
Minister of Youth Empowerment, Sport and Culture Development	Tshekedi Khama	14 December 2018	25 September 2019	BDP
Minister of Youth Empowerment, Sport and Culture Development	Dikgang Makgalemele (acting)	26 September 2019	1 November 2019	BDP

=== Assistant ministers ===
The April 2018 announcement specified ten assistant ministers in nine portfolios; Local Government and Rural Development had two. Two assistants were promoted to full ministerial office during the term, while changes in May 2019 affected the agriculture, health, investment and tertiary education portfolios.

Assistant ministers
Portfolio	Minister	Took office	Left office	Party
Office of the President
Assistant Minister of Presidential Affairs, Governance and Public Administration	Machana Shamukuni	1 April 2018	1 November 2019	BDP
Ministry of Agricultural Development and Food Security
Assistant Minister of Agricultural Development and Food Security	Frans van der Westhuizen	1 April 2018	19 December 2018	BDP
Assistant Minister of Agricultural Development and Food Security	Kostantinos Markus	19 December 2018	1 November 2019	BDP
Ministry of Basic Education
Assistant Minister of Basic Education	Thato Kwerepe	1 April 2018	1 November 2019	BDP
Ministry of Health and Wellness
Assistant Minister of Health and Wellness	Biggie Butale	1 April 2018	9 May 2019	BDP
Assistant Minister of Health and Wellness	Sethomo Lelatisitswe	9 May 2019	1 November 2019	BDP
Ministry of Land Management, Water and Sanitation Services
Assistant Minister of Land Management, Water and Sanitation Services	Itumeleng Moipisi	1 October 2016	1 November 2019	BDP
Ministry of Local Government and Rural Development
Assistant Minister of Local Government and Rural Development	Botlogile Tshireletso	21 October 2009	1 November 2019	BDP
Assistant Minister of Local Government and Rural Development	Kgotla Autlwetse	1 April 2018	1 November 2019	BDP
Ministry of Investment, Trade and Industry
Assistant Minister of Investment, Trade and Industry	Moiseraele Goya	1 April 2018	9 May 2019	BDP
Assistant Minister of Investment, Trade and Industry	Karabo Gare	9 May 2019	1 November 2019	BDP
Ministry of Youth Empowerment, Sport and Culture Development
Assistant Minister of Youth Empowerment, Sport and Culture Development	Dikgang Makgalemele	1 April 2018	1 November 2019	BDP
Ministry of Tertiary Education, Research, Science and Technology
Assistant Minister of Tertiary Education, Research, Science and Technology	Fidelis Molao	1 October 2016	9 May 2019	BDP
Assistant Minister of Tertiary Education, Research, Science and Technology	Moiseraele Goya	9 May 2019	1 November 2019	BDP

== Ministerial changes and reorganisation ==
=== June 2018 exchange of portfolios ===
Masisi's first alteration of his ministerial team took effect on 20 June 2018. Unity Dow and Vincent Seretse exchanged portfolios: Dow moved from Infrastructure and Housing Development to International Affairs and Co-operation, while Seretse took over infrastructure. The presidency announced the transfers without giving a public reason. The exchange was reported as part of the new administration's efforts to establish its own allocation of responsibilities.

=== December 2018 reshuffle ===
On 14 December 2018, a reallocation affecting five ministries was announced. Kitso Mokaila moved from Transport and Communications to Environment, Natural Resources Conservation and Tourism, replacing Tshekedi Khama. Khama moved to Youth Empowerment, Sport and Culture Development, displacing Thapelo Olopeng, who was assigned Tertiary Education, Research, Science and Technology. Ngaka Ngaka moved from tertiary education to Nationality, Immigration and Gender Affairs, while Dorcas Makgato transferred from nationality and immigration to transport. All five changes were transfers between existing members of the cabinet, rather than appointments of new ministers.

On 19 December, Masisi dismissed Pelonomi Venson-Moitoi from the Local Government and Rural Development portfolio, a day after she announced an intention to challenge him for the BDP presidency. Frans van der Westhuizen, previously Assistant Minister of Agricultural Development and Food Security, was appointed to replace her.

=== Changes in May and September 2019 ===
On 9 May 2019, Patrick Ralotsia was removed as Minister of Agricultural Development and Food Security. Fidelis Molao, formerly Assistant Minister of Tertiary Education, Research, Science and Technology, was appointed to the agriculture portfolio. The same announcement removed Biggie Butale as Assistant Minister of Health and Wellness, naming Sethomo Lelatisitswe in his place. Moiseraele Goya transferred from assistant minister for investment and trade to the corresponding post in tertiary education; Karabo Gare succeeded Goya in investment and trade. The changes were described by the presidency as taking immediate effect.

On 25 September 2019, Tshekedi Khama resigned from the ministry and the BDP in the run-up to the general election. The former president's brother subsequently aligned with the Botswana Patriotic Front (BPF), which had emerged from the split in the ruling party. On 26 September, assistant minister Dikgang Makgalemele was appointed to act in the Youth Empowerment, Sport and Culture Development portfolio. His assignment is recorded separately from a substantive ministerial appointment.

== Governmental record ==
The cabinet's formation coincided with Masisi's attempt to establish a presidency distinct from that of Ian Khama. In May 2018, the government replaced Isaac Kgosi, the head of the Directorate of Intelligence and Security. The decision, together with changes to economic policy and personnel, was presented as a departure from the previous administration. Scholars have subsequently examined how the disagreement between the two presidents developed into a conflict over party leadership and control of state institutions.

The government also faced longstanding criticism of the concentration of authority in the executive. In its 2019 assessment, Freedom in the World identified problems with institutional accountability, political influence over public institutions and restrictions on some civic freedoms, while continuing to characterise Botswana as an electoral democracy with competitive multiparty elections.

On 11 June 2019, the High Court of Botswana held in Motshidiemang v Attorney General that sections of the Penal Code criminalising consensual same-sex sexual activity between adults violated constitutional protections of liberty, privacy, dignity and equality. The case was brought by Letsweletse Motshidiemang and supported by the advocacy organisation LEGABIBO as amicus curiae.

In July 2019, Attorney General Abraham Keetshabe announced that the government would appeal against the High Court judgment, arguing that the court had erred in its conclusions. The decision to appeal distinguished the position taken by the state in litigation from the court's constitutional findings. The appeal remained unresolved when the first Masisi cabinet ended and was subsequently dismissed by the Court of Appeal in November 2021.

=== Motion of no confidence ===
On 10 July 2018, Leader of the Opposition Duma Boko moved a motion of no confidence in Masisi and his government in the National Assembly. The debate took place approximately 100 days after Masisi's accession. Boko alleged improper handling of the National Petroleum Fund affair and criticised senior public-service appointments and the government's observance of parliamentary procedures. These were accusations advanced by the opposition, not findings established by the parliamentary vote.

The motion was defeated.

10 July 2018; Motion of no confidence in the Masisi government Motion proposed by Duma Boko MP
Division →	10 July 2018
Required majority →	33/64
Aye	11 / 64
No	35 / 64
Abstentions	3 / 64
Did not vote	15 / 64
Result: Motion defeated

=== Economic policy and labour relations ===
In economic policy, the administration sought to differentiate itself from Khama's presidency through measures favouring private enterprise and investment. The government signalled a relaxation of aspects of Khama's alcohol-control policy, particularly the levy on alcoholic drinks, which had become a prominent subject of political controversy. Africa Confidential described the change as part of Masisi's wider programme of separating his presidency from that of his predecessor.

The government confronted persistent unemployment, limited economic diversification and dependence on diamond revenue. In its 2019 consultation with Botswana, the International Monetary Fund highlighted the need for fiscal consolidation, greater private-sector development and employment creation. These recommendations reflected underlying economic conditions extending beyond the administration's 19-month tenure.

In early 2019, the administration negotiated changes to public-service remuneration. The announced two-year pay arrangements differentiated between lower and higher salary bands and envisaged increases from April 2019 and April 2020. The negotiations occurred against a background of public-sector wage demands and constraints on the government's fiscal position.

=== Hunting and conservation ===
In May 2019, the government lifted Botswana's prohibition on hunting, introduced in 2014 under Khama. The decision followed public consultations and a review commissioned by the administration. The government argued that controlled hunting could help address conflict between wildlife, particularly elephants, and people living in affected rural communities. Critics, including conservation advocates, questioned the potential effects on wildlife protection and the implications of renewed trophy hunting.

The dispute became one of the most visible contrasts between the two presidencies. Khama had defended the earlier ban as a conservation measure; Masisi emphasised the circumstances of communities bearing the costs of wildlife protection. The policy therefore figured in both national political debate and the growing disagreement between Masisi and Khama.

=== Electoral reform ===
The administration supported the removal of provisions enabling the use of electronic voting machines in Botswana's elections. On 28 March 2019, the National Assembly passed legislation repealing the electronic-voting provisions that had been introduced into the electoral framework in 2016 but had not come into operation. The reform was enacted before the 2019 general election, which was conducted using paper ballots. Disagreement about electronic voting had involved government and opposition parties, though their reasons for supporting the repeal were not necessarily identical.

== 2019 election ==
=== The BDP leadership dispute ===
Relationships between Masisi and Khama deteriorated during 2018, becoming a contest over the leadership and political direction of the BDP. The selection of Tsogwane for the vice-presidency was one point of friction; appointments to security-related posts and Masisi's reversal of policies associated with Khama were others. The conflict extended to party structures, with Venson-Moitoi publicly challenging Masisi for the BDP presidency in December 2018.

Venson-Moitoi's challenge did not result in a leadership ballot. She withdrew in April 2019 following a dispute concerning the procedures for the contest, leaving Masisi to continue as party leader. Ian Khama subsequently left the BDP and backed the BPF. The split became particularly important in the Central District and created a new electoral challenge to the party that had governed Botswana continuously since 1965.

=== Election and succession ===
The 2019 Botswana general election took place on 23 October 2019. The BDP won 38 of the 57 directly elected National Assembly seats, one more than in 2014. The Umbrella for Democratic Change won 15, the BPF three and the Alliance for Progressives one. Although the defection of Khama and the creation of the BPF had generated expectations of a competitive contest, the BDP emerged with a renewed parliamentary majority. Masisi was declared elected President following the victory of his party and was sworn in for a new term on 1 November.

The first cabinet consequently came to an end with the beginning of the post-election presidential term. On 6 November, the Office of the President announced the composition of the second Masisi cabinet, again comprising 18 ministers but drawing heavily on newly elected and specially elected parliamentarians. Only three full ministers from Masisi's first administration—Unity Dow, Eric Molale and Kefentse Mzwinila—were retained in ministerial office, while three former assistant ministers also returned. This represented substantial turnover in the BDP's cabinet personnel following its electoral victory, which was due to a historic geographical political realignment. For the first time since the inaugural general election in 1965, the BDP lost parliamentary constituencies in the Central District, including all three seats in Serowe, the home town of Ian Khama. Conversely, the party made substantial gains in the more urban south, winning all five constituencies in Gaborone, which had previously been dominated by the opposition at the last general election.
