= 11th Parliament of Botswana =

←	10th	12th	→

Overview
- Legislative body: Parliament of Botswana
- Jurisdiction: Botswana
- Meeting place: Gaborone, Botswana
- Term: 2014 – 2019
- Government: Khama III; Masisi I
- Website: www.parliament.gov.bw

National Assembly
- Members: 63
- Speaker: Gladys Kokorwe
- Deputy Speaker: Kagiso Molatlhegi
- Leader of the Opposition: Duma Boko
- Party control: Botswana Democratic Party

This is a list of the members of the unicameral National Assembly of Botswana between 2014 and 2019. There were 63 seats in the assembly consisting of 57 MPs directly elected from constituencies, 4 specially elected MPs and 2 ex officio members; who were elected in the 2014 election.

== Graphical representation ==
Party key	Botswana Democratic Party	BDP
Party key	Botswana Congress Party	BCP
Party key	Umbrella for Democratic Change	UDC
Party key	Alliance for Progressives	AP

↓ 50%
41	2	13	6
Botswana Democratic Party	XO	UDC	AP

== List of MPs elected in the general election ==
#	Constituency	Name	Party	Votes	% of total votes
1	Chobe	Machana Shamukuni	BDP	4,114	55.9
2	Maun East	Kostantinos Markus	BDP	6,046	44.4
3	Maun West	Tawana Moremi	UDC	7,271	48.2
4	Ngami	Thato Kwerepe	BDP	7,063	46.9
5	Okavango	Bagalatia Arone	BCP (later defected to BDP)	6,864	53.9
6	Tati East	Samson Guma Moyo	BDP	5,864	59.7
7	Tati West	Biggie Butale	BDP	4,510	42.3
8	Francistown East	Buti Billy	BDP	3,818	45.0
9	Francistown South	Wynter Mmolotsi	UDC (later defected to AP)	5,261	52.1
10	Francistown West	Mokwaledi Ignatious Moswaane	BDP	5,305	53.5
11	Nata-Gweta	Polson Majaga	BDP	3,424	35.2
12	Nkange	Edwin Batshu	BDP	6,461	50.1
13	Shashe West	Fidelis Mmilili Molao	BDP	6,839	56.7
14	Tonota	Thapelo Olopeng	BDP	7,013	54.4
15	Bobonong	Shaw Kgathi	BDP	7,350	49.4
16	Mmadinare	Kefentse Mzwinila	BDP	7,325	68.7
17	Selibe Phikwe East	Nonofo Molefhi	BDP	3,376	40.4
18	Selibe Phikwe West	Dithapelo Keorapetse	BCP (BCP later joined UDC)	4,247	48.8
19	Lerala-Maunatlala	Prince Maele	BDP	6,356	53.8
20	Palapye	Moiseraela Goya	BDP	6,771	55.9
21	Sefhare-Ramokgonami	Dorcus Makgatho-Malesu	BDP	7,459	54.4
22	Mahalapye East	Botlogile Tshireletso	BDP	4,406	47.3
23	Mahalapye West	Joseph Molefe	BDP	6,542	55.8
24	Shoshong	Dikgang Makgalemele	BDP	5,377	50.3
25	Serowe North	Kgotla Autlwetse	BDP	9,611	84.5
26	Serowe West	Tshekedi Khama II	BDP	5,401	77.6
27	Serowe South	Pelonomi Venson-Moitoi	BDP	7,833	68.8
28	Boteti East	Lelatisitswe Sethomo	BDP	5,530	62.4
29	Boteti West	Slumber Tsogwane	BDP	5,790	47.8
30	Mochudi East	Moagi Molebatsi	UDC	6,824	38.8
31	Mochudi West	Gilbert Mangole	UDC	8,856	47.5
32	Gaborone Central	Phenyo Butale	UDC (later defected to AP)	4,601	39.6
33	Gaborone North	Haskins Nkaigwa	UDC (defected to AP but returned to UDC)	5,738	44.0
34	Gaborone South	Kagiso Molatlhegi	BDP	3,872	34.0
35	Gaborone Bonnington North	Duma Boko	UDC	7,694	53.6
36	Gaborone Bonnington South	Ndaba Gaolathe	UDC (later defected to AP)	6,646	57.3
37	Tlokweng	Masego Segokgo	UDC	6,442	55.9
38	Ramotswa	Samuel Rantuana	BCP (BCP later joined UDC)	7,307	40.4
39	Mogodtishane	Sedirwa Kgoroba	UDC (later defected to AP)	4,180	35.2
40	Gabane-Mmankgodi	Major General Pius Mokgware	UDC (later defected to AP)	7,155	41.5
41	Thamaga-Kumakwane	Tshenolo Mabeo	BDP	7,053	48.3
42	Molepolole North	Mohammed I. Khan	UDC	8,854	58.6
43	Molepolole South	Tlamelo Mmatli	UDC	5,967	50.2
44	Lentswaeletau-Mmopane	Vincent Seretse	BDP	7,170	43.1
45	Letlhakeng-Lephephe	Liakat Kablay	BDP	5,265	47.4
46	Takatokwane	Ngaka Ngaka	BDP	5,074	47.4
47	Lobatse	Advocate Sadique Kebonang	BDP	5,485	49.4
48	Goodhope-Mabule	Kgosi Lotlaamoreng Montshioa	UDC	6,712	48.9
49	Mmathethe-Molapowabojang	Dr Alfred Madigele	BDP	8,283	50.5
50	Kanye North	Patrick Ralotsia	BDP	5,726	35.6
51	Kanye South	Abram Kesupile	UDC	7,351	46.1
52	Moshupa-Manyana	Mokgweetsi Masisi	BDP	6,831	53.3
53	Jwaneng-Mabutsane	Shawn Ntlhaile	UDC	6,613	49.4
54	Kgalagadi North	Itumeleng Moipisi	BDP	4,648	49.9
55	Kgalagadi South	Frans Van Der Westhuizen	BDP	6,824	54.3
56	Ghanzi North	Noah Salakae	UDC	3,999	51.5
57	Ghanzi South	Christian de Graaff	BDP	4,812	52.3
–	Specially elected	Kenneth Matambo	BDP	–	
–	Specially elected	Unity Dow	BDP	–	
–	Specially elected	Eric Molale	BDP	–	
–	Specially elected	Kitso Mokaila	BDP	–	
–	Ex officio (President)	Ian Khama	BDP	–	
–	Ex officio (Attorney General)	Athaliah Molokomme	–	–	

== List of additional specially elected MPs in 2016 ==
On October 27, 2016, Parliament voted for two additional specially elected MPs, followed amendment of Section 58 of the Constitution, which increased the number of specially elected members from four to six.

#	Constituency	Name	Party	Votes	% of total votes
–	Specially elected	Bogolo Kenewendo		–	
–	Specially elected	Mephato Reatile	BDP	–	
