= List of parliamentary constituencies of Botswana =

parliamentary constituencies of Botswana in 2019

This is a list of parliamentary constituencies of Botswana. They are single member constituencies and elect members of the National Assembly of Botswana.

== Delimitation Commission ==
In accordance with section 64(1) of the Constitution of Botswana, a Delimitation Commission was appointed on 13 May 2022 (following the release of the decennial 2022 Botswana Census) to redistribute the constituencies of the National Assembly. The National Assembly passed a bill increasing the number of constituencies by four seats from 57 to 61 seats. Consultations with the public and various interest groups ran from 20 June to 28 November 2022. The Commission presented its finalised report to the President on 10 February 2023.

=== New seats ===
1. Mogoditshane West
2. Maun North
3. Okavango West
4. Okavango East
5. Kgatleng Central

=== Eliminated seat ===
1. Mmathethe-Molapowabojang

== List ==
=== 2024 ===
Constituencies used in the 2024 Botswana general election:

No.	Constituency	Name	Party	Majority	% of total votes	Margin (% points)
1	Chobe	Simasiku Mapulanga	BCP	2,853	63.31	34.49
2	Maun North	Dumelang Saleshando	BCP	5,707	64.08	43.65
3	Maun East	Goretetse Kekgonegile	BCP	4,061	59.14	32.09
4	Maun West	Caterpillar Hikuama	BCP	2,709	55.60	20.75
5	Ngami	Phillimon Aaron	BCP	2,255	59.54	22.84
6	Okavango West	Kenny Kapinga	BCP	1,049	53.12	11.11
7	Okavango East	Gabatsholwe Disho	BCP	795	50.11	9.34
8	Tati East	Thabologo Furniture	BCP	418	33.47	3.12
9	Tati West	Justin Hunyepa	UDC	3,490	49.99	25.99
10	Francistown East	Tiroeaone Ntsima	UDC	370	36.84	4.42
11	Francistown South	Wynter Mmolotsi	UDC	5,109	67.71	53.17
12	Francistown West	Mokwaledi Ignatius Moswaane	UDC	3,803	58.51	35.70
13	Nata-Gweta	Lawrence Ookeditse	BPF	3,916	52.62	33.21
14	Nkange	Motlhaleemang Moalosi	BCP	2,634	43.11	12.16
15	Shashe West	Jeremiah Frenzel	BPF	3,517	53.47	29.97
16	Tonota	Gaefele Sedombo	UDC	2,509	48.20	17.22
17	Bobirwa	Taolo Lucas	BCP	2,343	52.57	12.23
18	Mmadinare	Ketlhalefile Motshegwa	UDC	38	30.33	0.35
19	Selebi-Phikwe East	Kgoberego Nkawana	BCP	968	41.30	14.07
20	Selebi-Phikwe West	Reuben Kaizer	BCP	36	36.94	0.40
21	Palapye	Onneetse Ramogapi	UDC	4,022	44.34	18.74
22	Tswapong North	Prince Maele	UDC	3,076	37.44	15.49
23	Mahalapye East	Augustine Nyatanga	UDC	4,140	53.03	30.75
24	Mahalapye West	David Tshere	UDC	7,957	73.20	58.43
25	Tswapong South	Kesitegile Gobotswang	BCP	1,626	38.22	10.36
26	Shoshong	Moneedi Bagaisamang	UDC	5,112	58.22	38.43
27	Serowe North	Baratiwa Mathoothe	BPF	4,836	63.66	40.32
28	Serowe South	Lesedi Leepetswe	BPF	3,214	44.18	25.12
29	Serowe West	Onalepelo Kedikilwe	BPF	4,141	65.24	41.21
30	Boteti East	Atamelang Keoagile	UDC	2,278	41.92	15.90
31	Boteti West	Sam Digwa	UDC	2,235	49.17	14.66
32	Kgatleng Central	Mpho Morolong	UDC	2,114	43.63	12.74
33	Kgatleng East	Mabuse Pule	BDP	30	39.58	0.25
34	Kgatleng West	Unity Dow	BCP	193	33.05	1.44
35	Gaborone Central	Phenyo Butale	UDC	2,381	47.30	20.50
36	Gaborone North	Shawn Nthaile	UDC	935	37.28	6.51
37	Gaborone South	Nelson Ramaotwana	UDC	4,740	60.31	37.28
38	Gaborone Bonnington North	Maipelo Mophuting	UDC	2,565	47.90	21.94
39	Gaborone Bonnington South	Ndaba Gaolathe	UDC	5,674	63.73	41.07
40	Tlowkeng	Phenyo Segokgo	UDC	4,351	57.63	29.51
41	Gamalete	Boniface Mabeo	BCP	1,629	42.79	7.09
42	Mogoditshane East	Barongwang Letlhogonolo	UDC	1,103	45.38	11.29
43	Mogoditshane West	Galenawabo Lekau	UDC	1,375	42.46	13.39
44	Gabane-Mmankgodi	Thomas Mmusi	BDP	434	37.05	3.29
45	Mmopane-Metsimotlhabe	Helen Manyeneng	UDC	120	33.19	1.16
46	Thamaga-Kumakwane	Palelo Motaosane	BDP	2,191	53.29	14.05
47	Molepolole South	Shima Monageng	UDC	2,364	51.56	14.74
48	Molepolole North	Arafat Khan	UDC	3,057	54.50	12.88
49	Lentsweletau-Lephephe	Bogatsu Tshenolo	UDC	1,116	42.87	7.30
50	Letlhakeng	Domcaza Mogwathi	UDC	4,163	60.67	35.38
51	Takatokwane	Jacob Kelebeng	UDC	3,706	63.20	32.32
52	Lobatse	Kamal Jacobs	UDC	4,173	66.35	40.29
53	Goodhope-Mmathethe	Edwin Dikoloti	Ind.	5,151	45.06	18.88
54	Kanye East	Mogorosi Mosanana	UDC	3,488	66.20	19.19
55	Kanye West	Victor Phologolo	UDC	2,335	53.32	14.68
56	Moshupa-Manyana	Karabo Gare	BDP	6,865	59.50	30.43
57	Jwaneng-Mabutsane	Omphemetse Kwapa	UDC	1,426	44.48	7.33
58	Kgalagadi North	Reason Lekhutlane	UDC	283	48.55	2.67
59	Kgalagadi South	Tokyo Modise	UDC	2,840	57.08	23.96
60	Ghanzi	Noah Salakae	UDC	2,880	54.90	20.88
61	Charleshill	Motsamai Motsamai	UDC	295	41.07	3.73
Specially-elected MPs
62	Pius Mokgware		UDC			
63	Bogolo Kenewendo		Ind.			
64	Moeti Mohwasa		UDC			
65	Stephen Modise		UDC			
66	Lesego Chombo		Ind.			
67	Nono Kgafela-Mokoka		UDC			
President
68	Duma Boko		UDC			
Presiding officer
69	Dithapelo Keorapetse		Spkr.			

=== 2014 ===
Constituencies used in the 2014 Botswana general election:

List of constituencies
#	Constituency	Registered Voters	District	Current MP	Party	Headquarters	Year Established
1	Chobe	8,942	North-West	Ronald Shamukuni	BDP	Kasane	2002
2	Maun East	16,774	North-West	Kostantinos Markus	BDP	Maun	2002
3	Maun West	18,329	North-West	Tawana Moremi II	UDC	Maun	2002
4	Ngami	18,159	North-West	Thato Kwerepe	BDP	Sehithwa	2002
5	Okavango	15,243	North-West	Bagalatia Arone	BCP	Shakawe	2002
6	Tati East	11,802	North-East	Guma Moyo	BDP	Francistown	2002
7	Tati West	12,507	North-East	Biggie Butale	BDP	Masunga	2002
8	Francistown East	10,236	North-East	Buti Billy	BDP	Francistown	2002
9	Francistown West	12,511	North-East	Mokwaledi Moswaane	BDP	Francistown	2002
10	Francistown South	12,333	North-East	Wynter Mmolotsi	UDC	Francistown	2002
11	Nata-Gweta	11,009	Central	Polson Majaga	BDP	Sowa	2002
12	Nkange	15,078	Central	Edwin Batshu	BDP	Tutume	2002
13	Shashe West	14,375	Central	Fidelis Molao	BDP	Mathangwane	2002
14	Tonota	15,428	Central	Thapelo Olopeng	BDP	Tonota	2002
15	Bobonong	17,558	Central	Shaw Kgathi	BDP	Bobonong	2002
16	Mmadinare	13,108	Central	Kefentse Mzwinila	BDP	Mmadinare	2002
17	Selebi-Phikwe East	9,732	Central	Nonofo Molefhi	BDP	Selebi-Phikwe	2002
18	Selebi-Phikwe West	10,196	Central	Dithapelo Keorapetse	BCP	Selebi-Phikwe	2002
19	Lerala-Maunalala	13,929	Central	Prince Maele	BDP	Lerala	2002
20	Palapye	15,110	Central	Moiseraela Goya	BDP	Palapye	2002
21	Sefhare-Ramokgonami	15,960	Central	Dorcus Makgatho-Malesu	BDP	Sefhare	2002
22	Mahalapye East	10,993	Central	Botlogile Tshireletso	BDP	Mahalapye	2002
23	Mahalapye West	14,018	Central	Joseph Molefe	BDP	Mahalapye	2002
24	Shoshong	12,400	Central	Dikgang Makgalemele	BDP	Shoshong	2002
25	Serowe North	13,923	Central	Kgotla Autlwetse	BDP	Serowe	2002
26	Serowe West	8,500	Central	Tshekedi Khama II	BDP	Serowe	2002
27	Serowe South	13,909	Central	Pelonomi Venson-Moitoi	BDP	Serowe	2002
28	Boteti East	11,079	Central	Lelatisitswe Sethomo	BDP	Letlhakane	2002
29	Boteti West	14,492	Central	Slumber Tsogwane	BDP	Rakops	2002
30	Mochudi East	20,356	Kgatleng	Isaac Davids	UDC	Mochudi	2002
31	Mochudi West	21,146	Kgatleng	Gilbert Mangole	UDC	Ntshinoge	2002
32	Gaborone Central	14,054	South-East	Phenyo Butale	UDC	Gaborone	2002
33	Gaborone North	15,178	South-East	Haskins Nkaigwa	UDC	Gaborone	2002
34	Gaborone South	13,597	South-East	Kagiso Molathegi	BDP	Gaborone	2002
35	Gaborone Bonnington North	16,698	South-East	Duma Boko	UDC	Gaborone	2002
36	Gaborone Bonnington South	13,811	South-East	Ndaba Gaolathe	UDC	Gaborone	2002
37	Tlokweng	13,980	South-East	Same Bathobakae	UDC	Tlokweng	2002
38	Ramotswa	20,246	South-East	Samuel Rantuana	BCP	Ramotswa	2002
39	Mogoditshane	15,451	Kweneng	Sedirwa Kgoroba	UDC	Mogoditshane	2002
40	Gabane-Mmankgodi	20,644	Kweneng	Pius Mokgware	UDC	Gabane	2002
41	Thamaga-Kumakwane	16,856	Kweneng	Tshenolo Mabeo	BDP	Thamaga	2002
42	Molepolole North	17,022	Kweneng	Mohammed I. Khan	UDC	Molepolole	2002
43	Molepolole South	13,556	Kweneng	Tlamelo Mmatli	UDC	Molepolole	2002
44	Lentswaeletau-Mmopane	19,474	Kweneng	Tlamelo Mmatli	UDC	Lentsweletau	2002
45	Letlhakeng-Lephephe	12,772	Kweneng	Liakat Kablay	BDP	Letlhakeng	2002
46	Takatokwane	11,746	Kweneng	Ngaka Ngaka	BDP	Letlhakeng	2002
47	Lobatse	12,991	South-East	Sadique Kebonang	BDP	Lobatse	2002
48	Goodhope-Mabule	15,874	Southern	James Mathokgwane	UDC	Goodhope	2002
49	Mmathethe-Molapowabojang	19,073	Southern	Alfred Madigele	BDP	Mmathethe	2002
50	Kanye North	18,525	Southern	Patrick Ralotsia	BDP	Kanye	2002
51	Kanye South	18,729	Southern	Abram Kesupile	UDC	Kanye	2002
52	Moshupa-Manyana	14,882	Southern	Mokgweetsi Masisi	BDP	Moshupa	2002
53	Jwaneng-Mabutsane	15,554	Southern	Shawn Nthaile	UDC	Jwaneng	2002
54	Kgalagadi North	10,102	Kgalagadi	Itumeleng Moipisi	BDP	Hukuntsi	2002
55	Kgalagadi South	14,280	Kgalagadi	Frans Van Der Westhuizen	BDP	Tshabong	2002
56	Ghanzi North	9,156	Ghanzi	Noah Salakae	UDC	Ghanzi	2002
57	Ghanzi South	10,687	Ghanzi	Christian De Graaf	BDP	Charles Hill	2002
