= Dumezweni Mthimkhulu =

Motswana politician (1978–2024)

Minister of Tourism
- In office 26 February 2024 – 2 September 2024
- President: Mokgweetsi Masisi
- Preceded by: Philda Kereng
- Succeeded by: Nnaniki Wilhemina Tebogo Makwinja

Assistant Minister for State President of Botswana
- In office 13 February 2022 – 26 February 2024

Member of Parliament for Gaborone South
- In office 5 November 2019 – 2 September 2024
- Preceded by: Kagiso Molatlhegi
- Succeeded by: Nelson Ramaotwana

Personal details
- Born: 14 December 1978
- Died: 2 September 2024 (aged 45)
- Party: Botswana Democratic Party

Dumezweni Meshack Mthimkhulu (14 December 1978 – 2 September 2024) was a Motswana politician. He last served as the Minister of Environment and Tourism in Botswana, having served in the position from February 2024 until his death in September. Mthimkhulu took over the post from Philda Kereng who had been designated as Botswana’s High Commissioner to Nigeria.

Before he was the Assistant Minister for State President in Botswana, having been appointed to the position in 2019 by the current president of Botswana, Mokgweetsi Masisi. His term began on 13 February 2022.

Mthimkhulu died on 2 September 2024.

Awards and achievements
Preceded by	Assistant Minister for State President of Botswana	Succeeded by Boitumelo Gofhamodimo
