= Tswapong =

Tswapong may refer to:

- Tswapong Hills, a mountain range in Botswana
- Tswapong language, a Bantu language of Botswana
- Tswapong, name of one of the Tswana minorities
- Tswapong North and Tswapong South, two of the Parliamentary constituencies of Botswana
