= Ministry of Trade and Industry (Botswana) =

Government ministry of Botswana

The Ministry of Trade and Entrepreneurship
Agency overview
- Jurisdiction: Botswana
- Headquarters: Gaborone
- Minister responsible: Tiroeaone Ntsima
- Website: Official Website

The Ministry of Trade and Entrepreneurship, formerly known as the Ministry of Trade and Industry, is a ministry within the Cabinet of Botswana responsible for trade policy, industrial development, entrepreneurship support, and consumer protection. The current minister is Tiroeaone Ntsima, who has held the position since November 2024. His assistant is Baratiwa Mathoothe.

== Departments ==
- Department of Trade and Consumer Affairs (DTCA)
- Department of Industrial Affairs (DIA)
- Department for Co-operatives Development (DCD)
- Department of International Trade (DIT)
- Economic Diversification Drive Unit (EDDU)
- Doing Business and Investment Unit
- Research Statistics and Policy Development Unit

== Ministers ==
- Mmusi Kgafela (6 November 2019-)
