= Tumiso Rakgare =

Motswana former politician

Minister of Youth Empowerment, Sport and Culture Development
- In office 6 March 2020 – 11 November 2024
- President: Mokgweetsi Masisi
- Succeeded by: Lesego Chombo

Personal details
- Citizenship: Botswana
- Party: Botswana Democratic Party
- Profession: Politician

Tumiso Macdonald Rakgare is a Motswana politician who served as the Minister of Youth Empowerment, Sport and Culture Development.
