= Nnaniki Wilhemina Tebogo Makwinja =

Motswana politician

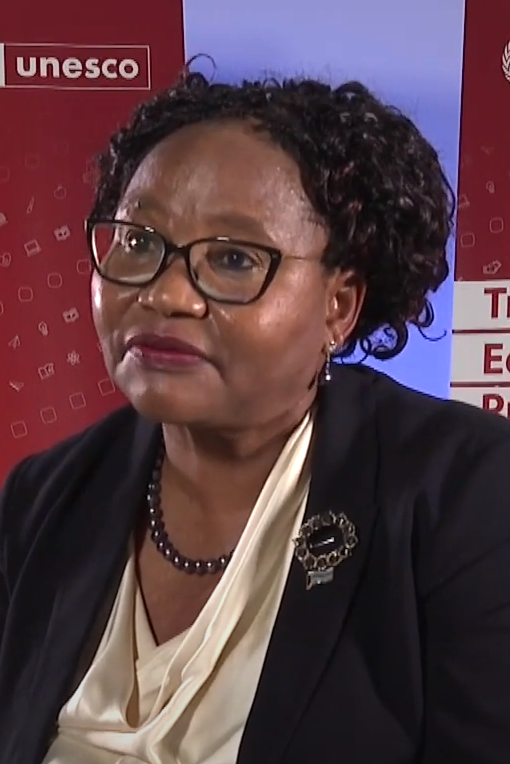

Minister of Environment and Tourism
- In office 9 September 2024 – 1 November 2024
- President: Mokgweetsi Masisi
- Preceded by: Dumezweni Mthimkhulu
- Succeeded by: Wynter Mmolotsi

Member of Parliament for Lentsweletau-Mmopane
- In office 23 October 2019 – 5 September 2024
- Preceded by: Vincent Seretse
- Succeeded by: Bogatsu Tshenolo

Personal details
- Party: Botswana Democratic Party
- Education: University of Essex (BA)

Nnaniki Wilhemina Tebogo Makwinja is a Motswana politician who served in the National Assembly of Botswana from 2019 until 2024, representing the Lentsweletau-Mmopane constituency as a member of the Botswana Democratic Party. She briefly served as Minister of Environment and Tourism from September until November 2024.

== Biography ==
Makwinja attended the University of Essex in England, graduating with a bachelor's degree in sociology and social policy in 1986. After graduating, she began working in the field of human resources management in Botswana. In 1986, she became a human resources employee at Debswana Mining Company, eventually becoming the company's manager for industrial communications and manpower development. After brief tenures with several companies in the 2000s, including a position as head of human resources at a hospital, Makwinja became acting CEO of the Botswana Investment and Trade Centre in 2012. In 2014, she began working at a human resources consulting firm called Leadex Consulting.

A member of the Botswana Democratic Party, Makwinja ran for the National Assembly of Botswana in the 2014 election, running in the Gabane-Mmankgodi constituency. However, she was defeated in the party primary. She ran for parliament again in the 2019 election, running in the Lentsweletau-Mmopane constituency. Though the initial vote-tally in the primary showed her losing to incumbent Vincent Seretse by just 45 votes, Makwinja called for a recount, claiming there were "irregularities" with the election. She was announced the winner of the primary following the recount. Makwinja won the general election, defeating three other candidates with 11,600 votes; her nearest opponent, the Umbrella for Democratic Change candidate, received 5,320 votes. She was one of only three female MPs elected in the 2019 election.

Following her election, Makwinja was appointed Assistant Minister of Basic Education by President Mokgweetsi Masisi. In this role, she oversees Botswana's primary and secondary education systems. She has faced several challenges during her tenure, including an outbreak of "mass hysteria" at a school in Salajwe in 2019, a textbook shortage in 2021, and the reformation of the country's curricula. Makwinja is also an advocate for digitization.

While in parliament, Makwinja has been an advocate for Asian investment into Botswana, supporting the establishment of Chinese-run farms and care facilities in her district, and backing Japanese partnership in the Botswana Network on Ethics, Law and HIV/AIDS program. She is also a prominent supporter of efforts to counter violence against women in Botswana, arguing that in addition to the moral implications, gender-based violence was leading to a loss in productivity. In 2022, she was a speaker at a conference organized by the United Nations Population Fund and the Southern African Development Community on improving sexual and reproductive health and rights.

Makwinja is one of Botswana's delegates to the Inter-Parliamentary Union, serving on the Committee on Middle East Questions.

Makwinja ran for re-election in the 2024 election, but was defeated in the party primary in August by Legojane Kebaitse, who was defeated in the general election by Alliance for Progressives candidate Bogatsu Tshenolo. On 9 September 4, 2024, Makwinja was appointed Minister of Environment and Tourism by President Mokgweetsi Masisi, and served in the role until the end of her parliamentary term on 1 November 2024.
