= Boteti East =

Parliamentary constituency in Botswana

- Single-member constituency for the National Assembly
- District: Central
- Population: 49,416
- Electorate: 18,315
- Major settlements: Letlhakane
- Area: 18,992 km^{2}

Current constituency
- Created: 2004
- Party: UDC
- Created from: Boteti
- MP: Keoagile Atamelang
- Margin of victory: 2,278 (15.9 pp)

Boteti East is a constituency in the Central represented by Keoagile Atamelang, a UDC MP in the National Assembly of Botswana since 2024.

== Constituency profile ==
Boteti East was created from the former Boteti constituency ahead of the 2004 general election. It was contested as Boteti South in 2004 and 2009, before being contested as Boteti East from the 2014 general election onwards.

The constituency lies in the Central District and is centred on Letlhakane.

The constituency has the following localities:

1. Letlhakane
2. Mmatshumo
3. Khwee
4. Makgaba
5. Mokubilo
6. Mmea
7. Mosu

== Members of Parliament ==
Key: BDP UDC

Election	Winner
2004 election	Lebonamang Mokalake
2009 election	Lebonamang Mokalake
2014 election	Sethomo Lelatisitswe
2019 election	Sethomo Lelatisitswe
2024 election	Keoagile Atamelang

== Election results ==
=== 2024 election ===
General election 2024: Boteti East
Party	Candidate	Votes	%	±%
UDC	Keoagile Atamelang	6,005	41.92	+13.71
BDP	Sethomo Lelatisitswe	3,727	26.02	−14.48
BPF	Lebonaamang Mokalake	2,653	18.52	−9.53
BCP	Daisy Bathusi	1,791	12.50	N/A
Independent	King Disana	150	1.05	N/A
Margin of victory		2,278	15.90	+3.61
Total valid votes		14,326	98.61	−0.16
Rejected ballots		202	1.39	+0.16
Turnout		14,528	79.32	−1.77
Registered electors		18,315		
UDC gain from BDP		Swing	+14.10	

=== 2019 election ===
General election 2019: Boteti East
Party	Candidate	Votes	%	±%
BDP	Sethomo Lelatisitswe	4,204	40.49	−22.87
UDC	Tshenolo Saakane	2,928	28.20	+6.00
BPF	Oboetswe Gabotlale	2,912	28.05	N/A
AP	Kabelo Morgan Tutwane	338	3.26	N/A
Margin of victory		1,276	12.29	−28.86
Total valid votes		10,382	98.77	+0.34
Rejected ballots		129	1.23	−0.34
Turnout		10,511	81.09	+1.22
Registered electors		12,962		
BDP hold		Swing	−14.43	

=== 2014 election ===
General election 2014: Boteti East
Party	Candidate	Votes	%	±%
BDP	Sethomo Lelatisitswe	5,530	63.36	+7.31
UDC	Petrus Mokgalo	1,938	22.20	−2.04
BCP	Daisy Bathusi	1,143	13.10	−6.61
Independent	King Disana	82	0.94	N/A
Independent	Morutegi Pelekekae	35	0.40	N/A
Margin of victory		3,592	41.15	+9.34
Total valid votes		8,728	98.43	+1.60
Rejected ballots		139	1.57	−1.60
Turnout		8,867	79.87	+9.25
Registered electors		11,102		
BDP hold		Swing	+4.67	

=== 2009 election ===
General election 2009: Boteti South
Party	Candidate	Votes	%	±%
BDP	Lebonamang Mokalake	4,354	56.05	−2.44
BNF	Leftotswe Mokgalo	1,883	24.24	+0.32
BCP	Tjiliga Letsholo	1,531	19.71	+2.13
Margin of victory		2,471	31.81	−2.76
Total valid votes		7,768	96.83	+1.29
Rejected ballots		254	3.17	−1.29
Turnout		8,022	70.62	+2.35
Registered electors		11,360		
BDP hold		Swing	−1.38	

=== 2004 election ===
General election 2004: Boteti South
Party	Candidate	Votes	%
BDP	Lebonamang Mokalake	2,944	58.49
BNF	Albert Mabelenga	1,204	23.92
BCP	Tjiliga Letsholo	885	17.58
Margin of victory		1,740	34.57
Total valid votes		5,033	95.54
Rejected ballots		235	4.46
Turnout		5,268	68.26
Registered electors		7,717	
BDP win (new seat)			
