= Talita Monnakgotla =

Motswana politician

Deputy Minister of Local Government and Rural Development of Botswana
- Incumbent
- Assumed office 13 February 2022
- President: Mokgweetsi Masisi

Personal details
- Born: Botswana
- Party: Botswana Democratic Party

Talita Monnakgotla is a Motswana politician and educator. She is the current Deputy Minister of Local Government and Rural Development in Botswana, having been appointed to the position in 2019 by the current president of Botswana, Mokgweetsi Masisi. His term began on 13 February 2022.

== Early life ==
She was born and bred in Hukuntsi in the 1960.

== Career ==
Talita joined Botswana Police Service in 1994 as a laboratory technician, the job that she said served in for eight years.She then together with her husband, established a transport business trading as AT &T Monnakgotla travel and tours from 2002 to present. She then joined politics to become a member of Parliament for Kgalagadi North constituency from 2019 to October 2024 where she lost the elections.

== Education ==
She is Diploma holder in laboratory technology.

Awards and achievements
Preceded by	Deputy Minister of Local Government and Rural Development of Botswana	Succeeded by
