= Ministry of Entrepreneurship =

Government ministry of Botswana

Ministry overview
- Formed: 11 November 2022; 3 years ago
- Jurisdiction: Government of Botswana
- Annual budget: P1 billion BWP (2022)
- Minister responsible: Karabo Gare

The Ministry of Entrepreneurship is a Botswana government ministry formulated to coordinate and promote Skill development, Employment creation and Entrepreneurship efforts in Botswana.

It also has a mandate of policy creation, Small, Medium and Micro Enterprises (SMMEs) development and coordination, wealth creation, citizen economic empowerment, coordination of value chains and women economic empowerment.

From inception, the current minister is Karabo Gare.

== Ministers ==
Ministers of Entrepreneurship of the Botswana since 2022:

Karabo Gare - October 2024

Tiroyaone Ntsima - November 2024 to date

== Agencies ==
1. Local Enterprise Authority (LEA)
2. Citizen Entrepreneurial Development Agency (CEDA)

== See also ==
- Government of Botswana
- Ministry of Defence and Security
- Ministry of Transport and Communications
