= Ministry of Local Government and Rural Development (Botswana) =

Government ministry of Botswana

The Ministry of Local Government and Rural Development is a ministry within the Cabinet of Botswana.

== Departments ==
Department of Local Government Finance and Procurement

Department of Local Governance and Development Planning

Department of Tribal Administration

Department of Local Government

Technical Services

Department of Social Protection

Department of Community Development

Rural Development

Corporate Services

== Ministers ==
- Kgotia K. Autlwetse (?-2023?)
- Eric Mothibi Molale (6 November 2019-?)
- Daniel Botwe (?-?)
