= Ministry of Environment and Tourism (Botswana) =

Government ministry of Botswana

The Ministry of Environment and Tourism is a ministry within the Cabinet of Botswana.

== Departments ==
- Department of Environmental Affairs
- Department of Meteorological Services
- Department of Waste Management and Pollution Control
- Department of National Museum and Monuments
- Department of Tourism
- Department of Forestry and Range Resources
- Department of Wildlife and National Parks
- Department of Corporate Services

== Ministers ==
- Philda Kereng (6 November 2019–c. 26 February 2024)
- Dumezdweni Mthimkhulu (26 February 2024–2 September 2024)
- Nnaniki Wilhemina Tebogo Makwinja (9 September 2024–1 November 2024)
- Wynter Mmolotsi (15 November 2024–present)
