= Ministry of Lands and Water Affairs (Botswana) =

Government ministry of Botswana

The Ministry of Lands and Water Affairs (MWLA) is a ministry within the Cabinet of Botswana. It is composed of 12 Land Boards, 41 Sub Land Boards, 8 Departments and 2 Parastatals being Water Utilities Corporation and Real Estate Advisory Council, being the Department of Lands, the Department of Town & Country Planning, the Department of Surveys & Mapping, the Department of Water and Sanitation the Project Management Office, the Land Tribunal, the Deeds Registry, and the Department of Corporate Services. The current minister is Kefentse Mzwinila in the second cabinet of President Mokgweetsi Masisi.

== Ministers ==
- Kefentse Mzwinila (6 November 2019-)
