= Ministry of Youth, Gender, Sport and Culture (Botswana) =

Government ministry of Botswana

The Ministry of Youth, Gender, Sport and Culture is a ministry within the Cabinet of Botswana. The current minister is Tumiso Rakgare and their assistant is Honest Buti Billy.

== Departments ==
- Arts and Culture Development Desk
- Youth Empowerment Desk
- Sport and Recreation Desk
- Department of National Service and Internship
- Botswana National Archives and Services
- Botswana National Library Service

== Ministers ==
- Tumiso Rakgare (6 November 2019-)
