= Kitso Mokaila =

Motswana politician

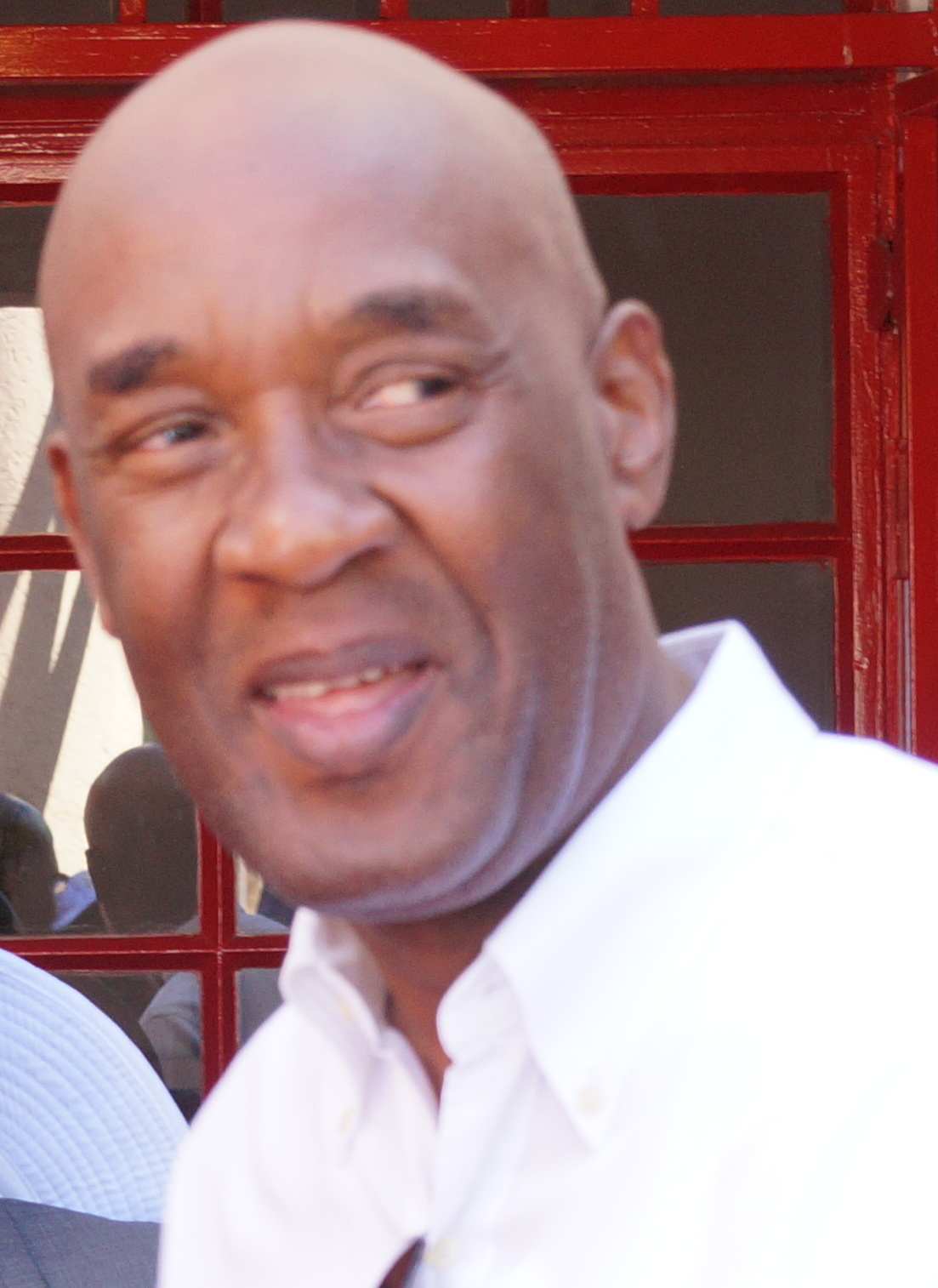
- Kitso Mokaila in 2017

Ambassador to the United States
- Incumbent
- Assumed office 17 September 2020
- President: Mokgweetsi Masisi

Specially Elected Member of Parliament
- In office 31 October 2014 – 28 August 2019
- Appointed by: H.E. Lieutenant General Dr Seretse Khama Ian Khama

Personal details
- Party: BDP

His Excellency Onkokame Kitso Mokaila is the ambassador for Botswana to the United States of America. He was elected to the National Assembly in the October 2004 general election, representing the governing Botswana Democratic Party.

Mokaila appointed as the Minister of Environment, Wildlife and Tourism by President Festus Mogae on 9 November 2004. He was appointed as Minister of Minerals, Energy and Water Resources on October 12, 2012. On September 17, 2020, he was accredited as the ambassador to the United States.

Mokaila studied to become an auto technician at the Swaziland College of Technology, and after graduating he joined the Botswana Defence Force in 1980. While serving in the army, he studied mechanical engineering at Military College of Electronics and Mechanical Engineering, India Secunderabad. In 1988 he retired from the army with the rank of captain, and he subsequently worked at International Computing Limited (ICL), Hyundai Motor Distributors, Wheels of Africa, and Unisis Africa.

== Gallery of photos ==
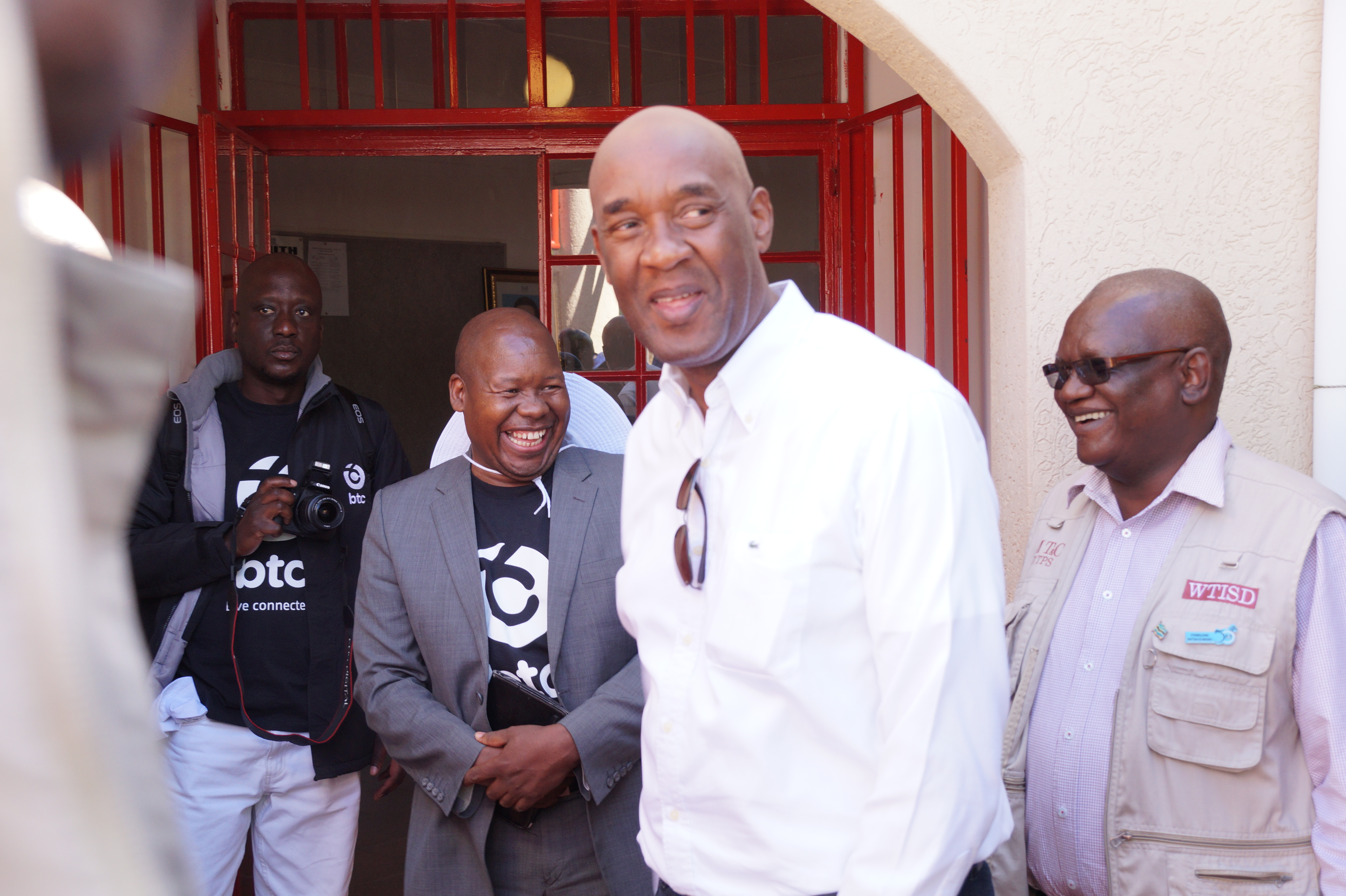
Honourable Mr. Onkokame Kitso Mokaila, officially opening the ICT room donated by Botswana Telecommunications Corporation at the World telecommunications and information society day 2017

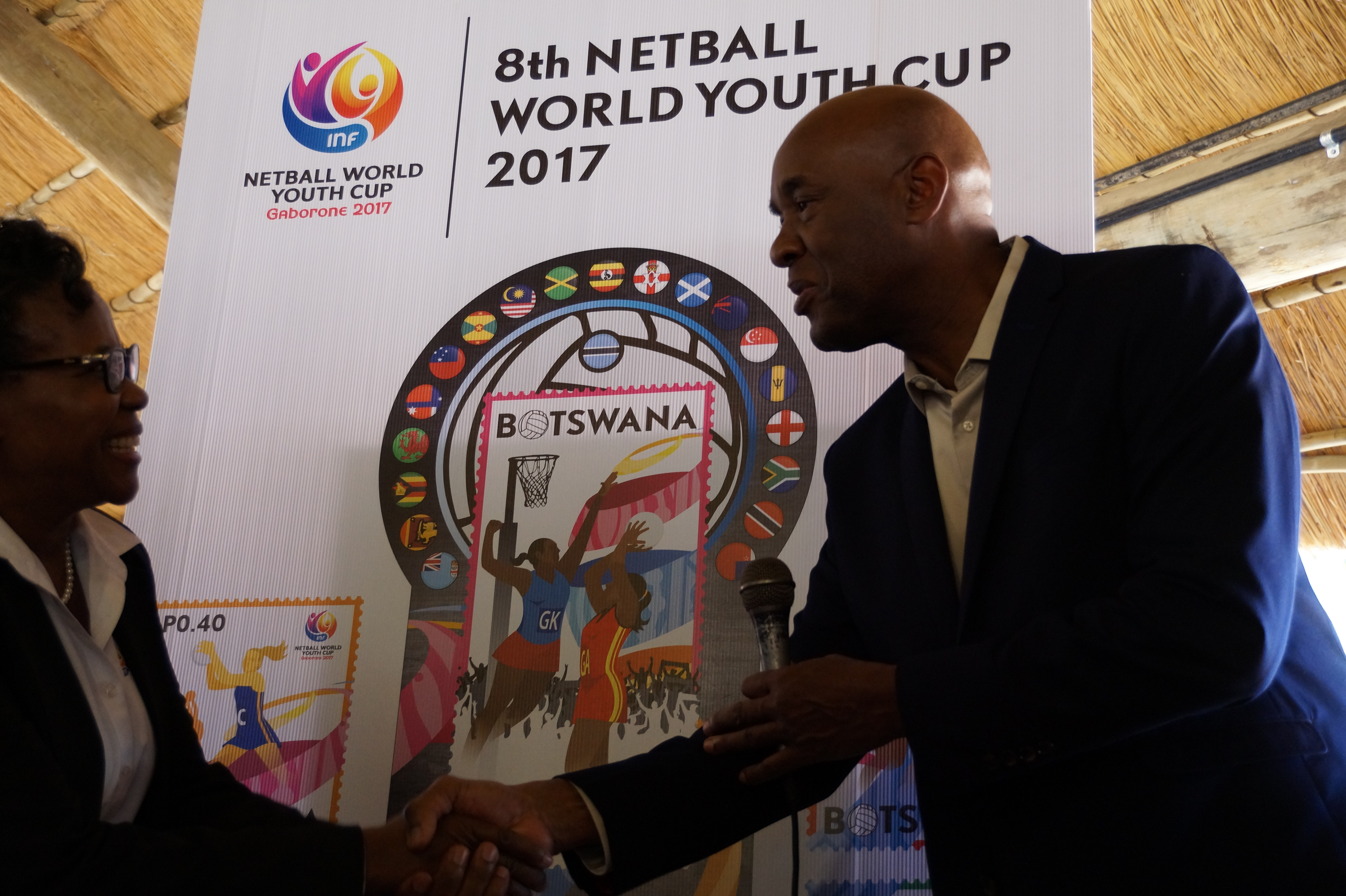
Honourable Mr. Onkokame Kitso Mokaila at the WTISD 2017

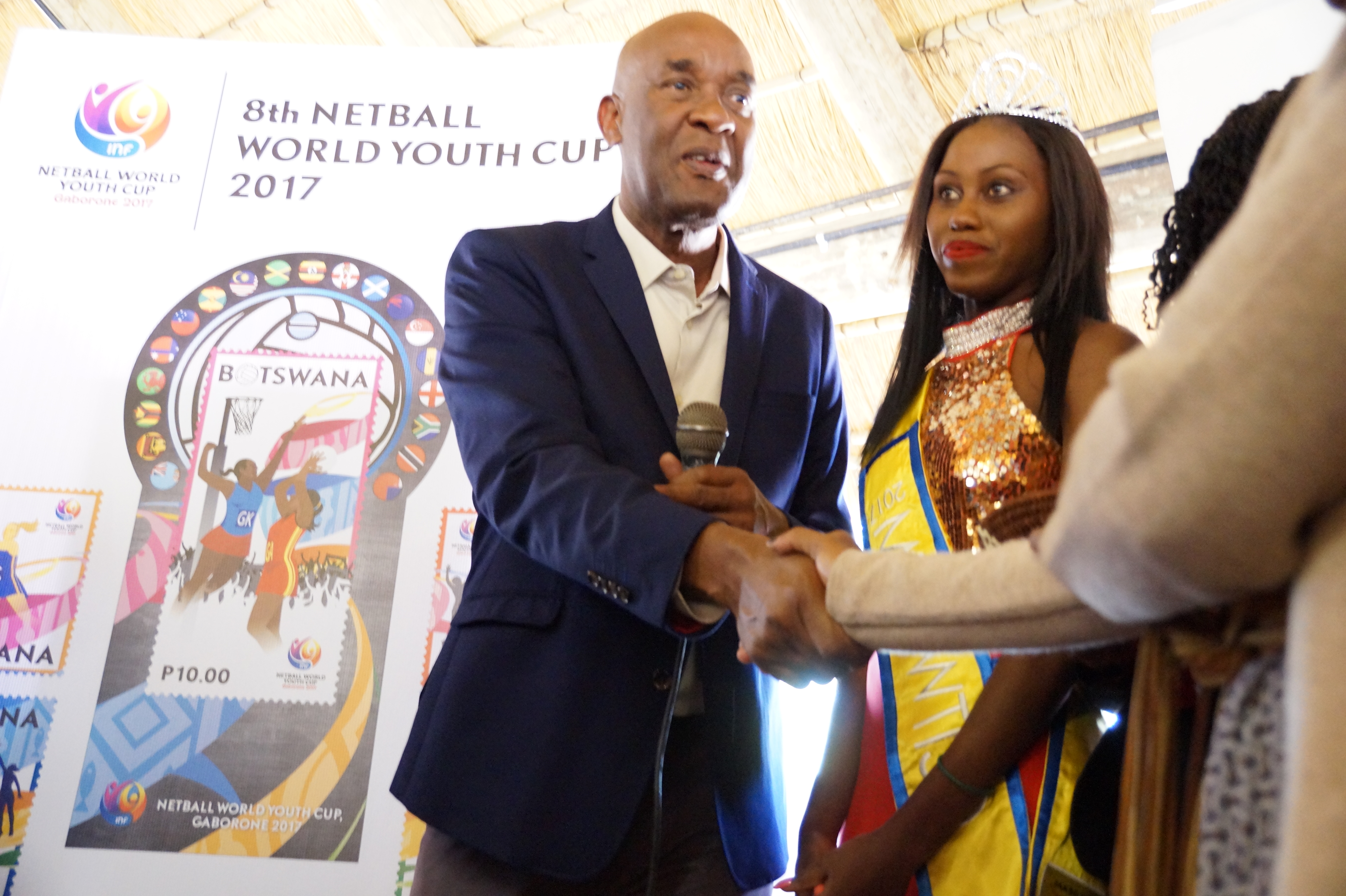
Honourable Mr. Onkokame Kitso Mokaila
