= Noah Salakae =

Motswana politician

Minister of Transport and Infrastructure
- In office 15 November 2024 – 18 August 2026
- President: Duma Boko
- Preceded by: Eric Molale
- Succeeded by: Keoagile Atamelang

Member of Parliament for Ghanzi
- Incumbent
- Assumed office 30 October 2024
- Preceded by: constituency established
- Majority: 2,880 (20.87%)

Member of Parliament for Ghanzi North
- In office 24 October 2014 – 28 August 2019
- Succeeded by: John Thiite

Personal details
- Party: Botswana National Front
- Other political affiliations: Umbrella for Democratic Change

Noah Salakae is a Motswana politician who has been Member of Parliament for Ghanzi since 2024.

== Politcial career ==
After the 2024 Botswana general election, he was appointed to the Boko cabinet as Minister of Transport and Infrastructure. He resigned in August 2026, following allegations of corruption.

== See also ==
- 11th Parliament of Botswana
- 13th Parliament of Botswana
