= Kgotla Autlwetse =

Motswana politician (1949–2025)

Honourable Kgotla Autlwetse

Minister of Local Government and Rural Development
- In office 26 January 2022 – 1 November 2024
- President: Mokgweetsi Masisi
- Preceded by: Eric Molale
- Succeeded by: Ketlhalefile Motshegwa

Assistant Minister of Local Government and Rural Development
- In office 6 November 2019 – 5 April 2022

Member of Parliament for Serowe North
- In office 28 October 2014 – 28 August 2019
- Preceded by: Constituency established
- Succeeded by: Baratiwa Mathoothe

Personal details
- Born: Kgotla Kenneth Autlwetse; 4 January 1949 Serowe, Bechuanaland Protectorate (now Botswana)
- Died: 3 June 2025 (aged 76) Gaborone, Botswana
- Party: Botswana Democratic Party
- Spouse: Gabalape Autlwetse
- Occupation: Teacher, politician

Kgotla Kenneth Autlwetse (4 January 1949 – 3 June 2025) was a Motswana politician and educator who served as Botswana's Minister of Local Government and Rural Development from 2022 to 2024. A long-time member of the Botswana Democratic Party (BDP), he earlier chaired the Central District Council and represented Serowe North in Parliament between 2014 and 2019.

== Early life and education ==
Autlwetse was born in Serowe on 4 January 1949. After qualifying as a teacher in the early 1970s he worked as an educator and education officer in the Central District.

== Local government career ==
In the 1990s Autlwetse entered local politics, becoming a councillor and later chairperson of the Central District Council, Botswana's largest local authority.

== Parliamentary career ==
=== Member of Parliament (2014–2019) ===
After two earlier electoral defeats, Autlwetse won the Serowe North constituency for the BDP at the 2014 Botswana general election on 24 October, polling 9,611 votes (85 percent). During the 11th Parliament, he sat on committees focused on rural infrastructure and youth employment. He lost what had long been regarded as a safe seat in the 2019 election, after a public rift between former president Ian Khama and his successor, President Mokgweetsi Masisi, led many Serowe voters to abandon the BDP. He was later appointed a specially-elected MP by president Mokgweetsi Masisi following his defeat.

== Ministerial career ==
=== Assistant Minister ===
President Mokgweetsi Masisi appointed Autlwetse Assistant Minister of Local Government and Rural Development soon after the 2019 elections.

=== Minister of Local Government and Rural Development (2022–2024) ===
On 26 January 2022, he was sworn in as full minister, succeeding Eric Molale. He launched Botswana's National Decentralisation Strategy to work towards a less centralised state and mediated high-profile bogosi (chieftaincy) disputes. Autlwetse left cabinet on 1 November 2024 following the defeat of the BDP at the 2024 Botswana general election.

== Death ==
Autlwetse died after a prolonged illness in Gaborone, on 3 June 2025, at the age of 76.

== Electoral history ==
=== 2019 election ===
General election 2019: Serowe North
Party	Candidate	Votes	%	±%
BPF	Baratiwa Mathoothe	5,394	42.66	New
BDP	Kgotla Autlwetse	4,356	34.45	–50.95
UDC	Keaobaka Kgano	1,656	13.10	+3.62
Independent	Dikgakgamatso Seretse	926	7.32	New
AP	Dods Selebego	312	2.47	New
Margin of victory		1,038	8.21	N/A
Total valid votes		12,644	98.97	+0.01
Rejected ballots		131	1.03	–0.01
Turnout		12,775	83.87	+2.38
Registered electors		15,231		
BPF gain from BDP		Swing	+46.81	

=== 2014 election ===
General election 2014: Serowe North
Party	Candidate	Votes	%
BDP	Kgotla Autlwetse	9,611	85.40
UDC	Dods Selebogo	1,067	9.48
BCP	Motswakhumo Basego	576	5.12
Margin of victory		8,544	75.92
Total valid votes		11,254	98.96
Rejected ballots		118	1.04
Turnout		11,372	81.49
Registered electors		13,955	
BDP notional hold			
