= Molapowabojang =

- Nickname: Slapong
- Motto: "Kgakala ke marung"
- Location within Botswana
- Coordinates: 25°12.4′S 25°33.7′E
- Country: Botswana
- District: Southern District
- Sub-district: Ngwaketse
- Established: 1914
- Named for: Molapowabojang River

Government
  - Councillor: Super Letshabo (BDP)

Population (2022 census)
  - Total: 8,722
- Demonym: Slaponian
- Time zone: UTC+2 (Central Africa Time)
- Website: www.facebook.com/groups/slapong/

Molapowabojang is a village in the Southern District of Botswana. It is located between Lobatse and Kanye, about 15 km north-west of Lobatse. The village had a population of 7,520 in the 2011 Census and 8,722 in the 2022 Census. The village falls under an administration of the Southern District Council which is headquartered in Kanye.

== History ==
Molapowabojang was founded in 1914. Most of its inhabitants are from the Southern District/Ngwaketse District. It is believed that the Matabele tribe once inhabited the place and used it as a harbor during the Mzilikazi Kingdom. This is evidenced by the footprints and butt prints that are visible in some rocks of Motsenekatse Hill and the name Motsenekatse has also been derived from "Mzilikazi".

== Geography ==
Molapowabojang is built along the river, hence the name Molapowabojang which means "Rivergrass". This river runs almost around the village and it is believed that it used to supply the village with fresh water before they had clean drinking water supply. There are also several hills in the village, Motsenekatse which is the largest, Chichi Hill, Ntomalome and several other smaller hills.

== Education ==
Molapowabojang has two primary schools, the oldest being Molapowabojang and Pitsonyane being the newer primary. In addition to these primary schools, there is a Community Junior Secondary School, Chichi Hill and Maraka Community junior secondary school, named after the hill due to its proximity to the hill. Chichi Hill CJSS caters for both primary schools in Molapowabojang as well as other surrounding villages like Kgomokasitwa, Maisane, etc.

== Developments ==
Molapowabojang residents have been struggling with their water supply, they could go for days without water as they were being supplied by the water trucks which had to fill up the supply tank. Recently Molapowabojang water supply has been connected to the Lobatse pipe lines to provide a steady water supply for the village. There is also a Geographical Survey (GS) building just opposite Bashanka Enterprises which has its headquarters in Lobatse.

== See also ==
- Sub-districts of Botswana
