= Beauty Manake =

Botswanan politician

Deputy Minister of Trade and Industry of Botswana
- In office 13 February 2022 – 1 November 2024
- President: Mokgweetsi Masisi
- Succeeded by: Baratiwa Mathoothe

Personal details
- Born: Botswana
- Party: Botswana Democratic Party

Beauty Manake is a Motswana politician and educator. She is the former Deputy Minister of Trade and Industry in Botswana, having been appointed to the position in 2019 by the former president of Botswana, Mokgweetsi Masisi. Her term began on 13 February 2022 and ended on 1 November 2024.

Awards and achievements
Preceded by	Deputy Minister of Trade and Industry of Botswana	Succeeded by
