= Baratiwa Mathoothe =

Motswana politician

Assistant Minister of Trade and Entrepreneurship
- Incumbent
- Assumed office 14 November 2024
- President: Duma Boko
- Preceded by: Beauty Manake

Member of Parliament for Serowe North
- Incumbent
- Assumed office 5 November 2019
- Preceded by: Kgotla Autlwetse

Personal details
- Party: Botswana Patriotic Front

Baratiwa Mathoothe is a Motswana politician who is MP for Serowe North since 2019. He was appointed Assistant Minister of Trade and Entrepreneurship in the Boko cabinet in November 2024, after President Duma Boko's 2024 electoral victory. He is assistant to Tiroyaone Ntsima In his tenure, he has strengthened economic ties with Colombia.

== Career ==
In 2023, Mathoothe was arrested because he shared a leaked Mokgweetsi Masisi State of the Nation speech in the Parliament WhatsApp group. He was concerned at how it was publicly available despite the President not delivered it yet. That night, DIS officers arrived at his house and arrested him. Mathoothe alleged it was the ruling Botswana Democratic Party who investigated him. He was later released.
