= Mmusi Kgafela =

Botswanan politician

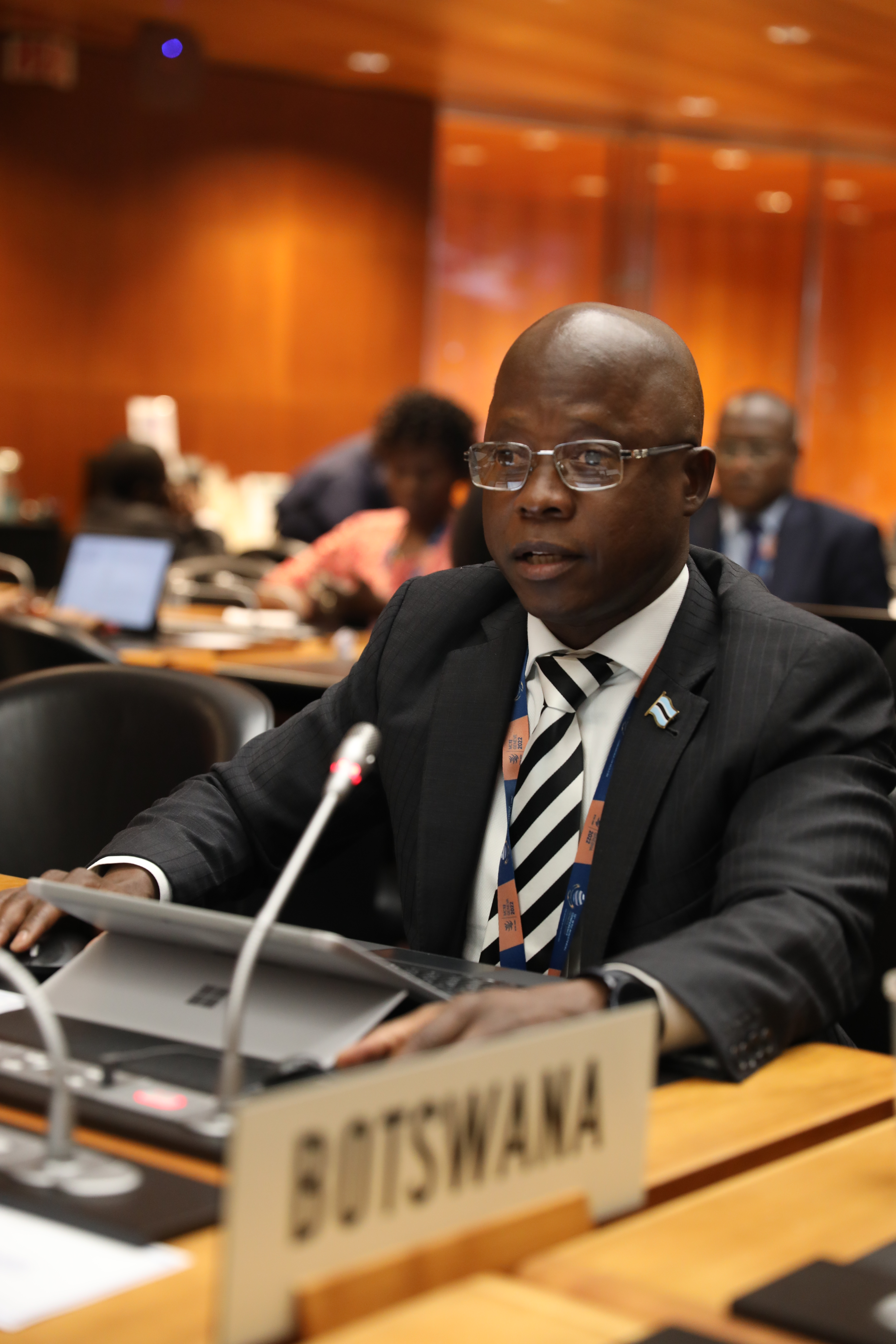

Minister of Trade and Industry of Botswana
- In office 13 February 2022 – 1 November 2024
- President: Mokgweetsi Masisi
- Succeeded by: Tiroeaone Ntsima

Member of Parliament for Mochudi West
- In office 5 November 2019 – 5 September 2024
- Preceded by: Gilbert Mangole
- Succeeded by: Constituency abolished

Personal details
- Born: Botswana
- Party: Botswana Democratic Party

Mmusi Kgafela is a Motswana politician and educator. He was the Minister of Trade and Industry in Botswana, having been appointed to the position in 2019 by the then president of Botswana, Mokgweetsi Masisi. His term began on 13 February 2022. He was also a member of parliament for Mochudi West constituency.

== Education ==
He holds Bachelor of Law from the University of Botswana where he started his political journey as a student politician.

== Early life ==
Honourable Kgafela is a lawyer by profession. He was an Attorney of the High Court and all other civil courts of Botswana. Conveyancer and a Notary Public jurisdiction of Botswana. He partnered with former Cabinet Minister Mr. Sadique Kebonang before he became a sole practitioner.Minister Kgafela previously served as Minister of Infrastructure and Housing Development.

== Family ==
Minister Mmusi Kgafela belongs to one of the chieftain clans from Bakgatla. He himself is a younger brother to the Kgosi (Chief) Kgafela II.

Awards and achievements
| Preceded by | Minister of Trade and Industry of Botswana | Succeeded by |
