= Karabo Gare =

Botswanan politician

Chairman of the Botswana Democratic Party
- Incumbent
- Assumed office 10 May 2025
- Preceded by: Slumber Tsogwane

Member of Parliament for Moshupa-Manyana
- Incumbent
- Assumed office 16 June 2018
- Preceded by: Mokgweetsi Masisi
- Majority: 6,865 (30.4%)

Minister of Entrepreneurship of Botswana
- In office 13 February 2022 – 1 November 2024
- President: Mokgweetsi Masisi
- Preceded by: Position established
- Succeeded by: Tiroeaone Ntsima

Assistant Minister of Investment, Trade and Industry
- In office 5 November 2019 – 13 February 2022
- Preceded by: Moiseraele Goya
- Succeeded by: Beauty Manake

Personal details
- Born: Botswana
- Party: Botswana Democratic Party

Karabo Socraat Gare is a Motswana politician and educator who has served as Member of Parliament (MP) for Moshupa-Manyana since 2018. He has been the chairman of the Botswana Democratic Party since his election in May 2025 succeeding Slumber Tsogwane.

He served in the Masisi cabinet firstly as the Assistant Minister of Investment, Trade and Industry from 2019 to 2022 and lastly as the Minister of Entrepreneurship from 2022 to 2024. His term began on 13 February 2022 and ended on 1 November 2024.

Awards and achievements
Preceded by	Minister of Entrepreneurship of Botswana	Succeeded by
