= Ministry of Health (Botswana) =

Government ministry of Botswana

Ministry of Health is a ministry of the Government of Botswana. Its stated aim is to promote and manage health and ensure environmental concerns are considered in all aspects of national development.

== Leadership ==
- Stephen Modise - Minister
- Lawrence Ookeditse - Assistant Minister

Citation:

== See also ==
- Health in Botswana
- COVID-19 pandemic in Botswana
- List of hospitals in Botswana
