= Sefhare =

- Village
- Location within Botswana
- Coordinates: 23°01′44.56″S 27°28′08.61″E
- Country: Botswana
- District: Central District

Population (2011)
  - Total: 5,295
- Time zone: GMT +2

Sefhare is a Botswana village located in the Central district. According to the 2011 census, the village has 5295 inhabitants.

== Location ==
In the territory of the village there are the following 19 locations:

- Booke of 2 inhabitants,
- Borotsi of 7 inhabitants,
- Dikamakama of 5 inhabitants,
- Ditshoswane with 136 inhabitants,
- Lelotong ,
- Lenganeng of 1 inhabitant,
- Letloreng of 411 inhabitants,
- Letsiara Farm ,
- Lwale of 13 inhabitants,
- Mafoloso of 6 inhabitants,
- Makobeng of 22 inhabitants,
- Marulamantsi
- Marotse of 16 inhabitants,
- Mokoloboto of 43 inhabitants,
- Morobisi ,
- Motlhaba ,
- Murukutshwane of 12 inhabitants,
- Newclear of 3 inhabitants,
- Rabalang of 6 inhabitants,
- Tswerelamakabi of 10 inhabitantsee
