= Pelonomi Venson-Moitoi =

Botswana journalist

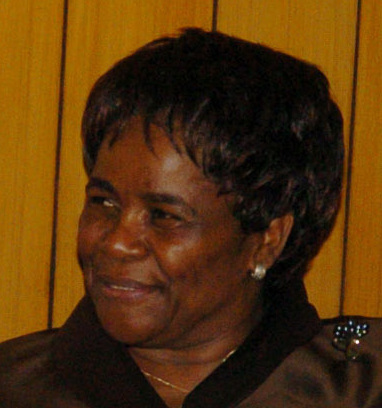

Minister of Foreign Affairs and International Cooperation
- In office 31 October 2014 – 4 April 2018
- President: Ian Khama; Mokgweetsi Masisi
- Preceded by: Phandu Skelemani
- Succeeded by: Unity Dow

Personal details
- Born: 31 May 1951 (age 75)
- Party: Botswana Democratic Party
- Education: Central Michigan University

Pelonomi Venson-Moitoi is a Motswana journalist and politician who served as Minister of Foreign Affairs of Botswana from 2014 until April 2018. She was appointed to the National Assembly of Botswana in 1999 as one of the four specially selected members and was re-elected in the 2004 general elections.

== Career ==
Venson-Moitoi was the Minister of Works, Transport and Communications from 2001 to 2002 and Minister of Trade, Industry, Wildlife and Tourism from 2002 to 2004. She was appointed the Minister of Communications, Science, and Technology in 2004. In the 2009 cabinet, Venson-Moitoi was appointed Minister of Communications, Science and Technology, and later she was appointed Minister of Education.

On 17 December 2018, Venson-Moitoi announced that she would contest the party presidency. President Mokgweetsi Masisi sacked her from Cabinet the following day.

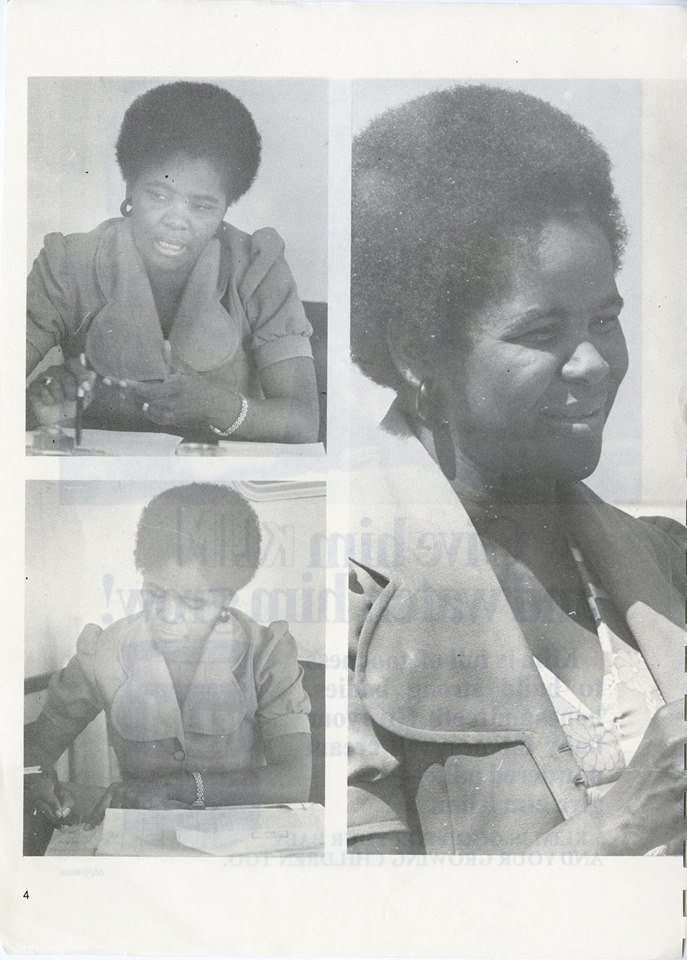
Pelonomi Venson-Moitoi while she was Administrative Secretary of Ngwato Land Board, 1975

On 5 April 2019 she wrote a letter to Secretary General of the Botswana Democratic Party stating that she was withdrawing from the presidential election, alleging that the election was "rigged from the beginning." The previous day, the High Court had ruled against her request to have the elective congress postponed, agreed with opposition lawyers that she had not proved if her citizenship was by birth or descent. Her candidacy had been supported by former President Ian Khama, who slammed the ruling party, accusing them of "cheating, intolerance and intimidation."

== Personal life ==
Dr Venson-Moitoi was born on the 13th of May 1951 in Botswana. She is married to Prince Moitoi and they have two children.

Political offices
Preceded by Phandu Skelemani	Minister of Foreign Affairs and International Cooperation; 2014–2018	Succeeded by Unity Dow
