= Mmathethe =

- Village
- Location within Botswana
- Coordinates: 25°18′52.11″S 25°16′10.10″E
- Country: Botswana
- District: Southern District

Population (2011)
  - Total: 5,078
- Time zone: GMT +2
- Climate: BSh

Mmathethe is a village located in the Southern District of Botswana. It had 5,078 inhabitants at the 2011 census.

== See also ==
- List of cities in Botswana
