= Sethomo Lelatisitswe =

Botswanan politician

Deputy Minister of Health of Botswana
- In office 13 February 2022 – 1 November 2024
- President: Mokgweetsi Masisi
- Succeeded by: Stephen Modise

Personal details
- Born: Botswana
- Died: 1 August 2025
- Party: Botswana Democratic Party

Sethomo Lelatisitswe was a Motswana politician and educator. He was the former Deputy Minister of Health in Botswana, after having lost in the 2024 general elections. He was appointed to the position in 2019 by the current president of Botswana, Mokgweetsi Masisi. His term began on 13 February 2022.

Awards and achievements
Preceded by	Deputy Minister of Health of Botswana	Succeeded by
