= Takatokwane =

- Village
- Location in Botswana
- Coordinates: 24°0′8″S 24°18′36″E
- Country: Botswana
- District: Kweneng District

Population (2001)
  - Total: 1,590

Takatokwane is a village in Kweneng District of Botswana. It is located in Kalahari Desert, 80 km north-west of Jwaneng. The population was 1,590 in 2001 census.
