= Tshenolo Mabeo =

Motswana politician

Minister of Transport and Communication
- In office 2014–2018
- President: Ian Khama; Mokgweetsi Masisi

Personal details
- Party: Botswana Democratic Party

Tshenolo Mabeo is a Motswana politician and former Minister of Employment, Labour Productivity and Skills Development and a former Minister of Transport and Communication for Botswana. He took office in 2014.

Minister of Employment, Labour Productivity and Skills Development, Mr Tshenolo Mabeo is mainly focused on the enhancement of labour productivity.

Skills and development component has been from the former Ministry of Education to Honorable Mabeo's ministry. The ministry looks into areas of employment and advice accordingly where new skills are needed, recommending for retooling exercises in order for staff to acquire new skills to stay competent. They also deal with issues of labour and social security and occupational health among others, including safety in the work place. The nationally well-known Madirelo Training and Testing Centre is also under his ministry as the centre deals with vocational skills.

The intended result is to enable many locals to create their own businesses with various vocational skills acquired from these institutions.
