= Dikgang Makgalemele =

Motswana politician

Dikgang Phillip Makgalemele is a Motswana politician who formerly served as a member of the Pan-African Parliament as well as the Parliament of Botswana, representing Shoshong. He additionally served as the Minister of Youth Empowerment, Sport and Culture Development under President Mokgweetsi Masisi. He is a member of the Botswana Democratic Party.
