= Fidelis Macdonald Molao =

Botswanan politician

Minister of Agriculture
- In office 13 February 2022 – 1 November 2024
- President: Mokgweetsi Masisi
- Preceded by: Edwin Dikoloti
- Succeeded by: Micus Chimbombi

Member of Parliament for Shashe West
- In office September 2010 – September 2024
- Preceded by: Baledzi Gaolathe
- Succeeded by: Jeremiah Frenzel

Minister of Basic Education
- In office 10 November 2019 – 22 April 2022
- President: Mokgweetsi Masisi
- Preceded by: Bagalatia Arone
- Succeeded by: Ministry abolished

Assistant Minister of Tertiary Education, Research, Science and Technology
- In office 29 September 2015 – 10 November 2019
- President: Ian Khama; Mokgweetsi Masisi
- Preceded by: Ministry established
- Succeeded by: Machana Ronald Shamukuni

Assistant Minister of Agriculture
- In office 1 March 2015 – 29 September 2015
- President: Ian Khama
- Preceded by: Patrick Ralotsia
- Succeeded by: Beauty Manake

Executive Director - BNYC
- In office 12 November 2009 – 31 July 2010
- President: Ian Khama
- Preceded by: Anthony Morima
- Succeeded by: Solly Reikeletseng

Personal details
- Born: 1977 (age 48–49) Mathangwane, Botswana
- Party: Botswana Democratic Party
- Education: Humanities
- Occupation: Politician
- Profession: Teacher
- Nickname: Mmilili

Fidelis Macdonald Molao is a Motswana politician and educator. He was the Minister of Agriculture in Botswana, having been appointed to the position in 2019 by former president, Mokgweetsi Masisi. His term began on 13 February 2022 and ended on 1 November 2024.

Awards and achievements
Preceded by	Minister of Agriculture of Botswana	Succeeded by
