= Nonofo Molefhi =

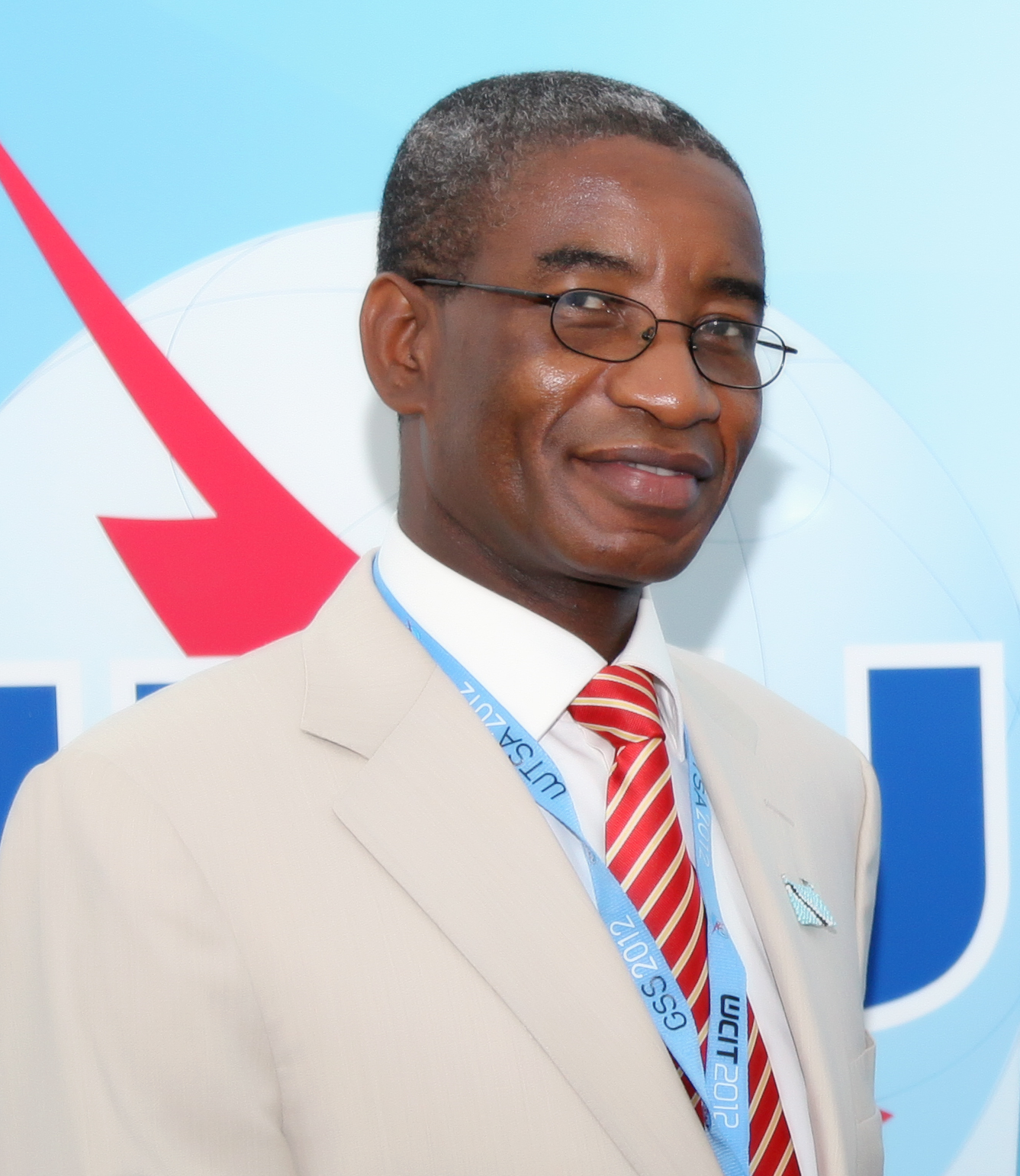

Minister of Infrastructure, Science and Technology
- Incumbent
- Assumed office 3 November 2014
- President: Ian Khama
- Preceded by: Johnie K. Swartz

Member of Parliament for Selibe Phikwe East
- Incumbent
- Assumed office 2004
- Preceded by: Daisy Pholo

Personal details
- Born: 20 November 1959 (age 66) Bechuanaland
- Party: BDP

Nonofo Molefhi is a Motswana politician.
