= Buti Billy =

Motswana politician

Honest Buti Billy

Deputy Minister of Youth, Gender, Sport and Culture of Botswana
- In office 13 February 2022 – 1 November 2024
- President: Mokgweetsi Masisi
- Succeeded by: position abolished

Member of Parliament for Francistown East
- In office 2014–2024
- Succeeded by: Ntsima Tiroeaone

Personal details
- Born: Botswana
- Party: Botswana Democratic Party

Honest Buti Billy is a Motswana politician and educator. He served as the Deputy Minister of Youth, Gender, Sport and Culture in Botswana, having been appointed to the position in 2019 by the former president of Botswana, Mokgweetsi Masisi. His term began on 13 February 2022 and ended in November 2024.

In the 2024 Botswana general election, Billy was defeated in a primary election for Francistown East.

Awards and achievements
Preceded by	Deputy Minister of Youth, Gender, Sport and Culture of Botswana	Succeeded by
