= Philda Kereng =

Motswana politician

High Commissioner of the Republic of Botswana to the Federal Republic of Nigeria
- Incumbent
- Assumed office 2024
- President: Advocate Duma Gideon Boko

Personal details
- Born: 17 March 1970 (age 56) Ramotswa, Botswana
- Children: 3
- Education: B.A, sociology and public administration, M.A, sociology of development

Philda Nani Kereng is a Motswana diplomat, social development expert, and former politician. She serves as the high commissioner of the Republic of Botswana to the Federal Republic of Nigeria. Previously, she was Botswana’s minister of environment and tourism, pivotal in shaping the country’s tourism and environmental policies. With over 30 years of experience in social development, she has been a strong advocate for child protection, community development, and sustainability.

== Early life and education ==
Kereng was born on 17 March 1970 in Ramotswa, Botswana. She earned a Bachelor of Arts degree in Sociology and Public Administration from the University of Botswana in 1994. In 1999, she obtained a Master of Arts in Sociology of Development from the University of Essex in the United Kingdom. Throughout her career, she has participated in various professional training programs, focusing on governance, rural development, environmental management, and policy analysis.

== Career ==
=== Early career ===
Before entering politics, Kereng worked extensively in social development, specializing in child protection, community economic empowerment, and environmental sustainability. She held positions such as Child Protection Officer at UNICEF and project officer at the Action for Economic Empowerment Trust (AEET). She has also worked as a consultant, providing expertise in policy development and community planning.

=== Political career ===
Kereng transitioned into politics in 2019 when she was nominated as a Specially Elected Member of Parliament, and subsequently appointed Minister of Environment & Tourism, a position she held from 2019 to 2024. During her tenure, she spearheaded Botswana’s tourism sector resilience during and recovery from post-COVID-19, revised the country’s Tourism Policy, Development Strategy & Master Plan, and played a key role in the development of Botswana’s Climate Change and Waste Management Policies. Her efforts contributed to Botswana’s recognition as a leading African tourism destination.

In 2024, she was appointed High Commissioner to Nigeria, representing Botswana’s diplomatic interests and strengthening bilateral relations with West African nations.

=== Advocacy ===
Kereng has been actively involved in initiatives supporting community-based tourism, sustainable development, and economic empowerment. She has worked with rural communities to develop ecotourism projects and has been a strong advocate for women's and youth empowerment. Her policies have focused on enhancing local participation in Botswana’s tourism industry while ensuring environmental conservation.

Kereng has been an active voice in international forums on tourism and sustainable development. In 2023, she served as a guest lecturer at the University of Oxford and addressed the UK Parliament’s House of Lords on conservation issues. Her expertise in policy advocacy has made her a key figure in discussions on tourism resilience and climate change adaptation in Africa.

== Personal life ==
Kereng is a devout Christian and a mother of three children. She is passionate about motivational speaking, life coaching, and mentoring women and young entrepreneurs on life skills, personal development, entrepreneurship, and leadership development. She continues to advocate for sustainability and climate change policies.

== Awards and recognitions ==
- Leadership Excellence Award (2021) – African Tourism Board
- PYNE Leadership Award (2022) – Lagos, Nigeria
- Leadership Award (2022) – Africa Tourism Leadership Forum
- Destination Africa Lifetime Award (2023) – Africa Tourism Leadership Forum
- Service Recognition Award (2023) – African Union

== See also ==
- Politics of Botswana
- Tourism in Botswana
- Women in African Leadership

Awards and achievements
Preceded by	Deputy Minister of Local Government and Rural Development of Botswana	Succeeded by
