= Kefentse Mzwinila =

Politician in Botswana

Honourable Kefentse C. Mzwinila
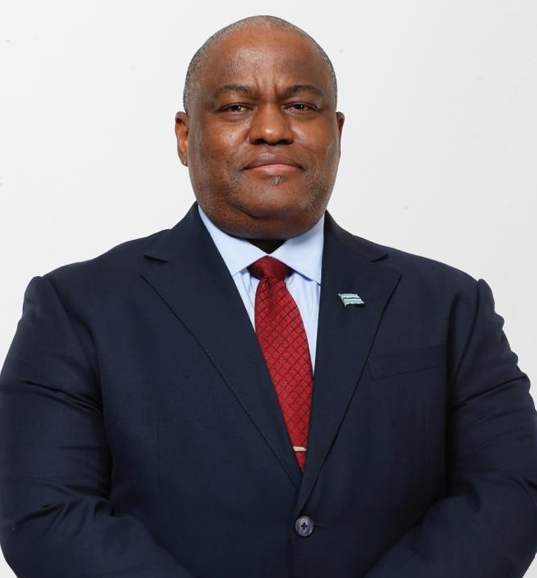

Minister of Lands, and Water Affairs (2018 - 2024)

Member of Parliament for Mmadinare Constituency (2014 - 2019)

Personal details
- Born: 6 January 1975 (age 51) Botswana
- Party: Botswana Democratic Party
- Education: North-West University (PhD), Yale University (MSc & MA), Lafayette College (BSc & BA), USA Army ROTC (Advanced Diploma), Waterford Kamhlaba United World College (Diploma).
- Occupation: Politician, Clinical Psychologist, and Entrepreneur

Kefentse C. Mzwinila (born January 6, 1975), is a public servant and psychologist from Botswana. He is notable for being the first registered Clinical Psychologist in Botswana and formerly served as the Minister of Lands and Water Affairs. He was appointed to the position in 2018 by the former President of Botswana, Mokgweetsi Masisi. In this Ministry, he oversees land administration, water resource management, and sanitation services in Botswana.

He worked as a commissioned officer in the Botswana Defence Force before working in the private sector as a Clinical Psychologist and Consultant Economist. He holds a PhD in Economics and Management Sciences with a focus on Business Administration (2022) from the North-West University Business School in South Africa.

== Background ==
=== Early life ===
Kefentse Mzwinila was born on January 6, 1975, in Botswana. He spent his early school days in the United States where his parents were studying. At the age of six, he was transferred to a special school for gifted and talented students. When he returned to Botswana, he continued his education at Broadhurst Primary School and later Maruapula. He was active in sports during his secondary school days and developed an interest in politics while studying at the Waterford Kamhlaba College in Swaziland in the early 1990s. He became the president of the Student Representative Council (SRC) during his school days.

He also became the president of the African Students Association for three consecutive terms while studying at Lafayette College in the United States. During his time at Lafayette College, he was also part of the military training and tactical operations. His experiences and achievements during his early life have shaped his future and contributed to his success in his career.

== Career ==
Clinical psychology

In 2001, Mzwinila founded Psychologists Botswana (Pty) Ltd strategically located across Botswana in Gaborone, Francistown, Maun, and Serowe. At Psychologists Botswana he held the following positions: Lead Consultant, Clinical Psychologist, Organisational Psychologist and Consultant Economist. Mzwinila has extensive experience in clinical psychology, which he has practiced for many years. He has worked with various clients, including individuals, couples, and families, helping them navigate mental health issues such as anxiety, depression, trauma, and relationship problems.

As a clinical psychologist, Mzwinila has expertise in assessment, diagnosis, and treatment of mental health disorders. He is skilled in various therapeutic approaches, including cognitive-behavioral therapy (CBT), psychodynamic therapy, and family therapy. He has also received training in trauma-focused cognitive-behavioral therapy and has experience working with survivors of trauma. Mzwinila has worked in various settings, including private practice, hospitals, and clinics. He has also provided psychological services in schools and community organizations. In addition to his clinical work, Mzwinila has also been involved in research and has published articles on mental health topics. He has presented his research at conferences and workshops, contributing to the advancement of knowledge in the field of clinical psychology.

Public service and politics

Since April 5, 2018, Mzwinila has served as the Minister of Lands and Water Affairs, spearheading crucial initiatives for the country's sustainable development such as making efforts to fast-track the allocation of plots and increasing the availability of clean water in Botswana. The Ministry of Lands and Water Affairs, under the leadership of Mzwinila, was reported to have implemented various projects within its mandate in the 2023/24 financial year. In the previous financial year, the ministry achieved a high budget utilisation rate of 99% suggesting efficient financial management and project execution within the Ministry. According to the current Minister of Finance, Honourable Peggy Serame, in her 2024/25 Budget Speech (6 February 2024), Botswana has largely been experiencing challenges in the implementation of government programmes and projects leaving substantial portions of the development budget unused. Therefore, such a high utilisation rate by the Ministry of Lands and Water Affairs is a welcome achievement for the southern African nation which is seeking to achieve high-income status by 2036.

Mzwinila previously served as the Assistant Minister of Youth Empowerment, Sports, and Culture Development. He has also served as a Member of Parliament for Mmadinare Constituency (2014-2019). He has held several leadership positions within the Botswana Democratic Party which include being the National Youth Leader of the Party between 2006 and 2008. and a Councilor at Sowa Town Council from 2009 to 2014.

== Campaigns ==
Mzwinila has been a key figure in Botswana's land reform efforts, working to ensure that land is distributed fairly and equitably among citizens. He has also campaigned for effective water resource management, aiming to ensure that Botswana's water resources are utilized efficiently and sustainably. In addition, he has championed youth empowerment initiatives, seeking to provide opportunities for young people to participate in the economy and politics. He has furthermore advocated for economic development policies aimed at diversifying Botswana's economy and reducing its reliance on diamonds including campaigning to raise awareness about mental health issues and reduce stigma around mental illness. Mzwinila has emphasized the importance of education and has worked to improve access to quality education for all Botswana citizens and has campaigned against corruption, seeking to promote transparency and accountability in government. He has advocated for improved healthcare services, including increased access to quality medical care and affordable healthcare options.

== Scholarship ==
Mzwinila's educational background reflects a multi-disciplinary approach. He obtained the following degrees:

- International Baccalaureate Diploma (1993) from Waterford Kamhlaba United World College.
- Advanced Diploma in Military Science (1997 from US Army ROTC.
- Bachelor of Arts in Economics and Business Administration (1997) from Lafayette College.
- Bachelor of Science in Psychology (1997) from Lafayette College.
- Master of Arts in Economics (1999) from Yale University.
- Master of Science in Psychology (1999) from Yale University.
- Doctor of Philosophy in Economics and Management Sciences (Business Administration) (2022), North-West University.

He is a scholar whose research delves into the intricacies of knowledge management strategies and their impact on the performance of vital entities like the Botswana Water Utilities Corporation. His PhD thesis titled, ''Exploring and developing a framework for knowledge management in the Botswana Water Utilities Corporation'' contended that the country's economic growth, especially in agriculture, mining and household welfare, is largely dependent on the proper management of its water resources.

Mzwinila has published journal articles tackling issues raised in his thesis. Furthermore, he has worked as a part-time Lecturer in Psychology, Counselling, and Guidance at the University of Botswana between 2003 and 2004.

== Videos ==
- Mzwinila was interviewed on Climate change and water resource management challenges in Southern African by the North-West University Business School after graduating with his doctorate.
- Mzwinila hosted a media briefing to give an update on the developments and progress of the ongoing water projects, and land allocation status.

Awards and achievements
Preceded by	Minister of Lands and Water Affairs of Botswana	Succeeded by
