= Eric Molale =

Motswana politician

Eric Mothibi Molale
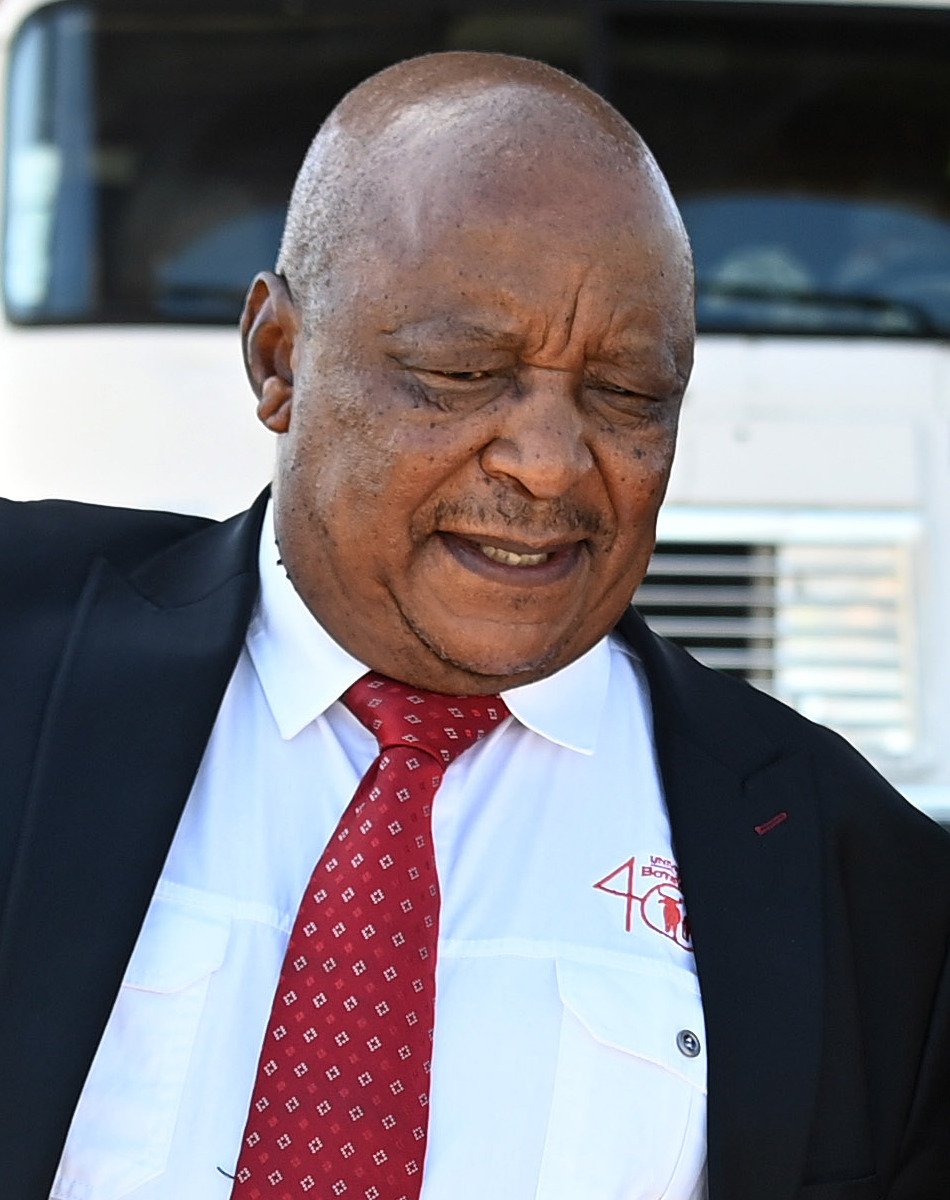

Minister of Transport and Communications of Botswana
- In office 13 February 2022 – 1 November 2024
- President: Mokgweetsi Masisi
- Succeeded by: Noah Salakae

Member of Parliament for Goodhope-Mabule
- In office 23 October 2019 – 5 September 2024
- Preceded by: Lotlamoreng II
- Succeeded by: constituency abolished

Personal details
- Born: Botswana
- Party: Botswana Democratic Party

Eric Mothibi Molale is a Motswana politician and educator who served as the Minister of Transport and Communications in Botswana. He was appointed to the position by President Mokgweetsi Masisi in 2019. His term as minister began on 13 February 2022 and ended on 1 November 2024.

Awards and achievements
Preceded by	Minister of Transport and Communications of Botswana	Succeeded by
