= Slumber Tsogwane =

Vice President of Botswana from 2018 to 2024

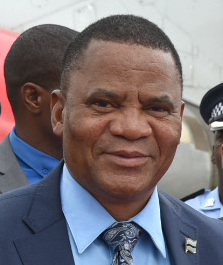
- Tsogwane in 2018

9th Vice-President of Botswana
- In office 4 April 2018 – 1 November 2024
- President: Mokgweetsi Masisi
- Chancellor: Botswana University of Agriculture and Natural Resources
- Preceded by: Mokgweetsi Masisi
- Succeeded by: Ndaba Gaolathe

Chairman of the Botswana Democratic Party
- In office 4 April 2018 – 10 May 2025
- Preceded by: Mokgweetsi Masisi
- Succeeded by: Karabo Gare

Member of Parliament for Boteti West
- In office 1999–2024
- President: Quett Masire; Festus Mogae; Ian Khama; Mokgweetsi Masisi
- Succeeded by: Sam Digwa

Minister of Local Government and Rural Development
- In office November 2014 – March 2018
- President: Ian Khama

Personal details
- Born: 21 September 1960 (age 65) Rakops, Bechuanaland (now Botswana)
- Party: Botswana Democratic Party
- Education: University of Botswana (BA) (MBA)
- Occupation: Politician

Slumber Tsogwane (born 21 September 1960) is a Motswana politician who served as Vice President of Botswana from April 2018 to November 2024. He is also former Member of Parliament for Boteti West. He was the longest serving Member of Parliament of the 12th Parliament of Botswana. He is a member of the Botswana Democratic Party.

== Early life and education ==
Slumber Tsogwane holds a Bachelor's Degree in Humanities obtained in 1985 from the University of Botswana, and a Master's Degree in Development Studies from the same university.

== Career ==
Tsogwane joined politics from public services where he was in the teaching fraternity holding the position of Deputy School Head. In 1997, he unsuccessfully applied for the post of BDP Executive Secretary. In 1998, Tsogwane defeated incumbent, Gabofele Masusu in primaries for Boteti constituency, and won the subsequent general elections in 1999. Tsogwane was appointed to cabinet in 2002, by Festus Mogae becoming Assistant Minister of Finance and Development Planning under Baledzi Gaolathe. He was dropped from cabinet following the 2004 general elections, joining the backbench. In 2014, after retaining Boteti West constituency, he was appointed Minister of Local Government and Rural Development by Ian Khama. Tsogwane is a member of the Botswana Democratic Party and also a Member of Parliament for Boteti West Constituency. He formerly served as Botswana's Local Government and Rural Development Minister from November 2014 to March 2018. Tsogwane took office on 4 April 2018 as Vice President of Botswana succeeding Mokgweetsi Masisi.

He is an alumnus of the University of Botswana. He gave opening remarks at Under 30 Africa Summit 2024.

== See also ==
- Mokgweetsi Masisi
- Ian Khama
