= Moiseraele Goya =

Botswana politician

Member of Parliament for Palapye
- In office 2009–2019
- Preceded by: Boyce Sebetela
- Succeeded by: Oneetse Ramogapi

Personal details
- Born: Moiseraele Master Goya
- Occupation: Politician

Moiseraele Master Goya is a Botswana politician who served on the Pan-African Parliament and Parliament of Botswana representing Palapye from about 2010 to 2013, as well as formerly serving as the Assistant Minister of Basic Education at the Ministry of Education and Skills Development (after transferring from the Ministry of Trade and Investment). He was a part of the Botswana Democratic Party until resigning in 2021.
