= Mokgweetsi Masisi =

President of Botswana from 2018 to 2024

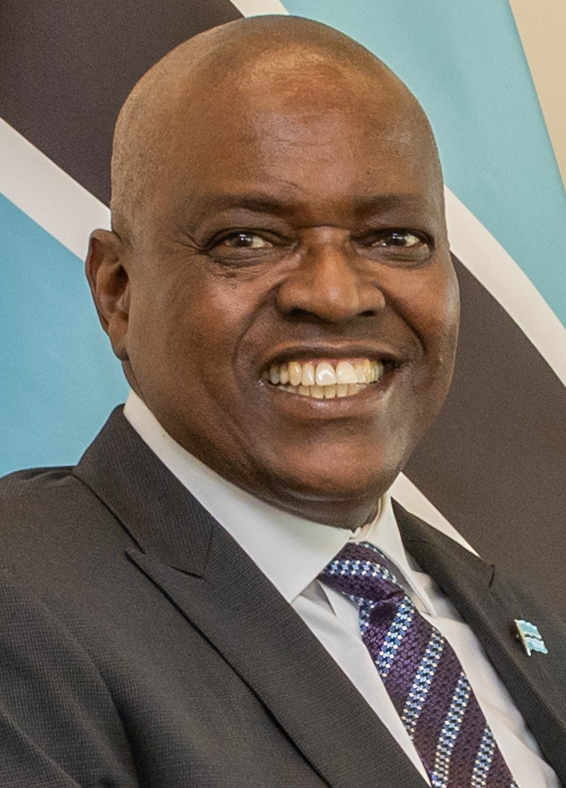
- Masisi in 2023

5th President of Botswana
- In office 1 April 2018 – 1 November 2024
- Vice President: Slumber Tsogwane
- Preceded by: Ian Khama
- Succeeded by: Duma Boko

8th Vice President of Botswana
- In office 12 November 2014 – 1 April 2018
- President: Ian Khama
- Preceded by: Ponatshego Kedikilwe
- Succeeded by: Slumber Tsogwane

President of the Botswana Democratic Party
- In office 1 April 2018 – 10 May 2025
- Preceded by: Ian Khama
- Succeeded by: Mpho Balopi

Chairman of the Botswana Democratic Party
- In office 4 July 2015 – 4 April 2018
- Preceded by: Ian Khama
- Succeeded by: Slumber Tsogwane

Member of Parliament for Moshupa-Manyana
- In office 16 October 2009 – 1 April 2018
- Preceded by: Maitlhoko Mooka
- Succeeded by: Karabo Gare

Personal details
- Born: Mokgweetsi Eric Keabetswe Masisi; 21 July 1961 (age 65) Moshupa, Bechuanaland (now Botswana)
- Party: Botswana Democratic Party
- Spouse: Neo Maswabi (m. 2002)
- Children: 1
- Education: University of Botswana; Florida State University
- Occupation: Politician; teacher; author
- Profession: Teacher
- Cabinet: Masisi I; Masisi II
- Nickname: Sisiboy

Mokgweetsi Eric Keabetswe Masisi (/mɔːkˈweɪtsi/; born 21 July 1961) is a Motswana politician who served as the fifth president of Botswana from 2018 to 2024. He served as the eighth vice president of Botswana from 12 November 2014 to 1 April 2018. He was a Member of Parliament in the National Assembly for the Moshupa-Manyana constituency from 2009 to 2018.

Initially having a good relationship with former President Ian Khama, who appointed Masisi as vice president, the two later clashed over a ban on elephant hunting, and Khama accused Masisi of having "stifled dissent". Coming to power in the 2019 elections, the opposition claimed irregularities and electoral fraud. However, an observation mission from the African Union reported that the elections were conducted transparently and met international standards.

His government oversaw the country's response to the COVID-19 pandemic. Amidst the pandemic, Masisi ruled by decree from March 2020 to September 2021, despite protests from the public and opposition parties.

== Early life and education ==
Mokgweetsi Masisi is the son of Edison Masisi (1921–2003), the long-time MP for Moshupa and long-time cabinet member. The younger Masisi grew up in Gaborone, attending Thornhill Primary School and Maru-a-Pula School. One of his three brothers, Tshelang, was the MP for Francistown West, while another is a retired army general. He also has a sister, Phadi.

In school, Masisi competed in soccer and tennis, but ultimately found acting to be his calling. In 1984, he won acclaim for his portrayal of the lead role in a Gaborone production of Cry the Beloved Country. He has taken part in several South African films.

In the 1980s, Masisi became a high school social studies teacher after graduating from the University of Botswana in 1984 with a degree in English and History. He taught at Mmanaana Secondary School in 1984 in Moshupa village before moving on to the University of Botswana in 1987 as a curriculum development specialist.

In 1989, he went to Florida State University to obtain a Bachelor's and master's degrees in Social Studies Education and Instructional Systems. Masisi had become aware of the FSU program after meeting faculty members working in Botswana for the Junior Secondary Education Improvement Project. Following graduation, he was employed by UNICEF in Botswana. In 1999, he obtained a postgraduate degree in Economics and Social Policy from the University of Manchester, where he was a Chevening scholar.

== Career ==
Masisi unsuccessfully sought the nomination of the ruling Botswana Democratic Party (BDP) to stand in Moshupa constituency in the 2004 general election. However, he obtained the BDP nomination for the same seat prior to the 2009 general election and won the seat. He was promptly appointed Assistant Minister for Presidential Affairs and Public Administration in October 2009. After a little more than a year as an assistant minister, he was appointed Minister for Presidential Affairs and Public Administration in January 2011. Masisi became Minister of Education and Skills Development in an acting capacity in April 2014. He was re-elected to his seat in Parliament in October 2014, and was appointed Minister of Education and Skills Development on 28 October 2014. Masisi was appointed Vice President of Botswana by President Ian Khama on 12 November 2014 while remaining in his post as Minister of Education.

President Khama appointed Masisi as the Chancellor of the University of Botswana on 5 July 2017. The appointment, which was in consonance with Section 7 of the University of Botswana Act of 2008, was for a period of five years. It followed the death of former President Quett Masire, who served as the Chancellor until he died on 22 June 2017.

== President (2018–2024) ==
On 1 April 2018, he was sworn in as the 5th President of Botswana. After he ascended to the presidency, his predecessor Ian Khama left the ruling Botswana Democratic Party (BDP) to found the Botswana Patriotic Front (BPF). Khama criticized Masisi for lifting the ban on elephant hunting and called his decision to appoint Masisi as his successor a "mistake".

On 13 October 2018, Masisi received an honorary doctorate from the University of Botswana. Some commentators have criticized this decision, and claimed that the correct process was not followed.

=== Economic policy ===
The Masisi government adopted and promoted market-oriented, liberal economic policies to diversify the economy away from its reliance on diamonds.

Under Masisi's administration, the country adopted austerity measures due to the dwindling supply of diamonds, Botswana's main export, a 45 percent youth unemployment rate, and what opposition politicians criticized as the country's first budget deficit in 40 years.

=== Foreign policy ===
Masisi made foreign policy a prominent aspect of his presidency, with Botswana seeking to strengthen its role in regional and international affairs. His government placed greater emphasis on bilateral, regional and multilateral engagement, including using presidential foreign visits to promote Botswana's national interests, attract investment and strengthen international cooperation.

Under Masisi, Botswana increased its engagement with the Southern African Development Community (SADC). In 2021, Masisi served as Chairperson of the SADC Organ on Politics, Defence and Security Cooperation and was involved in regional efforts to address political and security challenges. In July 2021, he dispatched a SADC fact-finding mission to Eswatini following political and security disturbances, calling for calm, restraint and national dialogue. SADC subsequently commended Masisi for his leadership and efforts to address regional peace and security threats.

Masisi also sought to strengthen relations with China. During his presidency, Botswana reaffirmed its adherence to the One-China policy and worked to restore mutual trust with Beijing. In 2018, Masisi visited China and attended the 2018 Beijing Summit of the Forum on China–Africa Cooperation, where Botswana and China announced the establishment of a strategic partnership.

=== 2019 elections ===
In October 2019, Masisi was re-elected president after the BDP faced the biggest threat to its unity in more than five decades, following Khama's move to the opposition, accusing Masisi of authoritarianism. In the 2019 Botswana general election, Masisi received a 52.65% majority of the vote and received a majority of seats in the National Assembly. The 2019 Botswana elections were hotly contested, and the main opposition, the Umbrella for Democratic Change lodged a litany of court challenges alleging irregularities and electoral fraud. The High Court ruled against the allegations and the elections were deemed credible by international observers. The African Union Election Observation Mission (AUEOM) concluded that the elections were transparent and conducted peacefully. The election conformed to international and regional best practices and standards.

Amongst his election pledges, he proposed lifting the ban on elephant hunting and decriminalising homosexuality. When Botswana's Attorney General appealed a court decision decriminalising homosexuality later that year, Masisi (then president) spoke out in favour of the court order.

=== Response to the COVID-19 pandemic (2020–22) ===
In early 2020, COVID-19 pandemic in Botswana occurred during Masisi's time in office. The President responded to the pandemic by declaring a state of emergency on 31 March 2020. After the declaration, emergency powers allowed Masisi to rule by decree for a period of 18 months to September 2021, despite protests from some opposition parties. In December, Botswana found evidence of a new strain, leading to a curfew being enforced from 24 December 2020 to 3 January 2021. After nearly two years of the State of Public Emergency and threats of protests from the public and opposition parties, Masisi announced he would not renew the State of Public Emergency, which saw him rule by decree for this period, also bringing an end to the curfews that had been in place by the end of September 2021.

Masisi has been accused by some opponents of having authoritarian views, and contributing to undermining democracy in Botswana. Former President Ian Khama, who has fallen out with Masisi since his election, alleged that Masisi "stifled dissent" in an interview with the Financial Times, and added that Botswana's reputation was being undermined locally and internationally, and that democracy was in decline.

On 3 January 2022, it was announced that Masisi was in mandatory self-isolation after testing positive for COVID-19 during routine testing. Vice-President Slumber Tsogwane assumed the president's responsibilities while he was in isolation.

=== 2024 elections ===
At the 2024 general elections, the Botswana Democratic Party lost its majority in the National Assembly for the first time in the country's history. Masisi conceded defeat on November 1, and promised a peaceful transfer of power. He was succeeded as president by Duma Boko.

== Political opinions ==
Masisi proposed lifting the ban on elephant hunting and decriminalising homosexuality.

Masisi was in support of elephant hunting in Botswana and believed that allowing some ivory trading would allow more funding for conservation and protection efforts. In 2019, he presented stools made from elephant feet to the national leaders of Namibia, Zambia and Zimbabwe, a move that received some criticism from international media outlets. Masisi reversed the ban on elephant hunting put in place by his predecessor and removed Botswana's "Shoot to Kill" anti-poaching policy.

== Personal life ==
In 2002 Masisi married Neo Maswabi, an accountant who later worked for the United Nations in New York and in Addis Ababa. They have a daughter.

Masisi is colloquially referred to as "Sisiboy" among the population, a play of words on his family name.

Political offices
| Preceded by Ponatshego Kedikilwe | Vice President of Botswana; 2014–2018 | Succeeded by Slumber Tsogwane |
| Preceded by Ian Khama | President of Botswana; 2018–2024 | Succeeded by Duma Boko |
