= Francistown East =

Parliamentary constituency in the North-East District, 1994 onwards

- Single-member constituency for the National Assembly
- District: North-East
- Population: 33,551
- Major settlements: Francistown
- Area: 47 km^{2}

Current constituency
- Created: 1994
- Party: UDC
- Created from: Francistown
- MP: Tiroeaone Ntsima
- Margin of victory: 370 (4.4 pp)

Francistown East is a constituency in the North-East District represented in the National Assembly of Botswana by Tiroeaone Ntsima of the Umbrella for Democratic Change since 2024.

== Constituency profile ==
The constituency was originally created in 1994, as part of an increase in the population of Francistown constituencies. The Botswana Democratic Party (BDP) has held the seat since its inaugural election in 1994 and lost it 30 years later in the 2024 general election amongst a nationwide swing against the BDP which saw it lose power for the first time.

The urban constituency encompasses the following locations:

1. Eastern Francistown

== Members of Parliament ==
Key: BDP UDC

Election	Winner
1994 election	Patrick Balopi
1999 election	Joy Phumaphi
2004 election	Phandu Skelemani
2009 election	Phandu Skelemani
2014 election	Buti Billy
2019 election	Buti Billy
2024 election	Tiroeaone Ntsima

== Election results ==
=== 2024 election ===
General election 2024: Francistown East
Party	Candidate	Votes	%	±%
UDC	Tiroeaone Ntsima	3,081	36.84	+4.23
BDP	Godisang Radisigo	2,711	32.42	−25.21
BCP	Vain Mamela	1,741	20.88	N/A
BPF	Keorapetse Muzila	830	9.92	N/A
Margin of victory		370	4.42	N/A
Total valid votes		8,363	99.54	−0.08
Rejected ballots		39	0.38	+0.08
Turnout		8,402	76.17	−4.29
Registered electors		11,030		
UDC gain from BDP		Swing	+14.72	

=== 2019 election ===
General election 2019: Francistown East
Party	Candidate	Votes	%	±%
BDP	Buti Billy	4,651	57.63	+12.49
UDC	Morgan Moseki	2,632	32.61	+19.99
AP	Theresa Mmolawa	433	5.37	N/A
BPF	Kgalajwe Kgalajwe	354	4.39	N/A
Margin of victory		2,019	25.02	+22.12
Total valid votes		8,070	99.62	−0.09
Rejected ballots		31	0.38	+0.09
Turnout		8,101	80.46	−2.83
Registered electors		10,068		
BDP hold		Swing	+16.24	

=== 2014 election ===
General election 2014: Francistown East
Party	Candidate	Votes	%	±%
BDP	Buti Billy	3,818	45.14	−8.14
BCP	Morgan Moseki	3,573	42.24	−2.85
UDC	Theresa Mmolawa	1,067	12.62	N/A
Margin of victory		245	2.90	−5.29
Total valid votes		8,458	99.71	+0.27
Rejected ballots		25	0.29	−0.27
Turnout		8,508	83.29	+9.65
Registered electors		10,215		
BDP hold		Swing	−2.65	

=== 2009 election ===
General election 2009: Francistown East
Party	Candidate	Votes	%	±%
BDP	Phandu Skelemani	3,698	53.28	−5.44
BCP	Morgan Moseki	3,130	45.09	+19.49
BPP	Margret Selolwane	113	1.63	−14.05
Margin of victory		568	8.19	−24.91
Total valid votes		6,941	99.44	+1.18
Rejected ballots		39	0.56	−1.18
Turnout		6,980	73.64	+0.97
Registered electors		9,478		
BDP hold		Swing	−12.47	

=== 2004 election ===
General election 2004: Francistown East
Party	Candidate	Votes	%	±%
BDP	Phandu Skelemani	3,255	58.72	+7.59
BCP	Morgan C. M. Moseki	1,419	25.60	+7.51
BPP	Kambulani William	869	15.68	N/A
Margin of victory		1,836	33.10	+0.06
Total valid votes		5,543	98.26	−0.31
Rejected ballots		99	1.74	+0.31
Turnout		5,642	72.67	−3.32
Registered electors		7,764		
BDP hold		Swing	+7.55	

=== 1999 election ===
General election 1999: Francistown East
Party	Candidate	Votes	%	±%
BDP	Joy Phumaphi	4,310	51.13	+12.57
BNF	I. P. Woto	1,525	18.09	−16.38
BCP	R. Sikwane	1,416	16.80	N/A
BAM	Knight Maripe	1,178	13.98	N/A
Margin of victory		2,785	33.04	+28.95
Total valid votes		8,429	98.57	N/A
Rejected ballots		153	1.43	N/A
Turnout		8,582	75.99	+1.52
Registered electors		11,294		
BDP hold		Swing	+14.48	

=== 1994 election ===
General election 1994: Francistown East
Party	Candidate	Votes	%
BDP	Patrick Balopi	2,873	38.56
BNF	Peter Woto	2,568	34.47
BPP	B. Balikani	2,010	27.00
Margin of victory		305	4.09
Turnout		7,451	74.47
Registered electors		10,006	
BDP win (new seat)			
