= Serowe West =

Parliamentary constituency in Botswana

- Single-member constituency for the National Assembly
- District: Central
- Population: 29,739
- Major settlements: Serowe
- Area: 15,955 km^{2}

Current constituency
- Created: 2004
- Party: BPF
- Created from: Boteti; Serowe North; Serowe South
- MP: Onalepelo Kedikilwe
- Margin of victory: 4,151 (41.2 pp)

Serowe West is a constituency in the Central District represented by Onalepelo Kedikilwe, a BPF MP in the National Assembly of Botswana since 2023.

== Constituency profile ==
Serowe West lies in the Central District and is primarily rural, with the main settlement being the village of Serowe. The constituency is part of the three historically safe BDP seats that flipped to the BPF and had an average swing of 76.7pp towards the BPF. This shift was attributed to the fact that the BaNgwato tribe, of which the Khama family is the royal family, resides in the Serowe area. Prior to Ian Khama's departure from the BDP, the constituency consistently voted for the party by significant margins. However, following the fallout between Ian Khama and President Mokgweetsi Masisi, Khama encouraged people in the Serowe region to vote for the newly formed BPF and this message strongly resonated with the locals. His brother, Tshekedi Khama held onto the seat at the 2019 general election under the BPF banner, the first time the constituency returned a non-BDP MP.

Serowe West was the constituency of Botswana's fourth President, Ian Khama, from 2004 until his ascension to the presidency in 2008 as sitting presidents cannot simultaneously be an elected member of the National Assembly since a constitutional amendment in place since 1974. The constituency was named Serowe North West from its inaugural election in 2004 until the 2014 where it has since kept its current name. The constituency has the following localities:

1. Parts of Serowe
2. Malatswai
3. Mmashoro
4. Dimajwe

== Members of Parliament ==
Key: BDP BPF

Election	Winner
2004 election	Ian Khama
2008 by-election	Tshekedi Khama
2009 election	Tshekedi Khama
2014 election	Tshekedi Khama
2019 election	Tshekedi Khama
2023 by-election	Onalepelo Kedikilwe
2024 election	Onalepelo Kedikilwe

== Election results ==
=== 2024 election ===
General election 2024: Serowe West
Party	Candidate	Votes	%	±%
BPF	Onalepelo Kedikilwe	6,555	65.24	+9.87
BDP	Foster Seretse	2,414	24.03	−6.28
BCP	Sebusiso Ngwenya	864	8.60	N/A
BRP	Chimbidzani Chimidza	214	2.13	N/A
Margin of victory		4,151	41.21	+16.15
Total valid votes		10,047	99.06	+2.18
Rejected ballots		95	0.94	−2.18
Turnout		10,142	79.21	−1.52
Registered electors		12,804		
BPF hold		Swing	+8.08	

=== 2023 by-election ===
By-election 2023: Serowe West
Party	Candidate	Votes	%	±%
BPF	Onalepelo Kedikilwe	2,933	66.90	+11.53
BDP	Moemedi Dijeng	1,266	28.88	−1.43
BCP	Sebusiso Ngwenya	103	2.35	N/A
Independent	Kefilwe Koboto	82	1.87	N/A
Margin of victory		1,667	38.02	+12.96
Turnout		4,422	~44.99	~−35.74
BPF hold		Swing	+6.48	

=== 2019 election ===
General election 2019: Serowe West
Party	Candidate	Votes	%	±%
BPF	Tshekedi Khama	4,394	55.37	N/A
BDP	Moemedi Dijeng	2,405	30.31	−48.26
UDC	Rolent Gambule	749	9.44	−4.35
AP	Leremela Bogosing	387	4.88	N/A
Margin of victory		1,989	25.06	N/A
Total valid votes		7,935	96.88	−1.86
Rejected ballots		256	3.12	+1.86
Turnout		7,935	80.73	−1.13
Registered electors		9,829		
BPF hold		Swing	+51.82	

=== 2014 election ===
General election 2014: Serowe West
Party	Candidate	Votes	%	±%
BDP	Tshekedi Khama	5,401	78.57	−5.20
UDC	Rolent Gambule	948	13.79	−2.44
BCP	Kalvin Seabe	431	6.27	N/A
Independent	Keitereng Kebosenke	94	1.37	N/A
Margin of victory		4,453	64.78	−2.76
Total valid votes		6,874	98.74	+0.67
Rejected ballots		88	1.26	−0.67
Turnout		6,962	81.86	+6.99
Registered electors		8,505		
BDP hold		Swing	−1.38	

Note: UDC vote share is compared to the vote share of the BNF in 2009.

=== 2009 election ===
General election 2009: Serowe North West
Party	Candidate	Votes	%
BDP	Tshekedi Khama	5,031	83.77
BNF	Gagolepe Nthebolang	975	16.23
Margin of victory		4,056	67.54
Total valid votes		6,006	98.07
Rejected ballots		118	1.93
Turnout		6,124	74.87
Registered electors		8,179	
BDP hold			

=== 2008 by-election ===
By-election 2008: Serowe North West
Party	Candidate	Votes	%
BDP	Tshekedi Khama	1,869	94.01
BNF	Gagolepe Nthebolang	119	5.99
Margin of victory		1,750	88.02
Total valid votes		1,988	N/A
Turnout		1,988	~32.10
Registered electors		~6,194	
BDP hold			

=== 2004 election ===
General election 2004: Serowe North West
Party	Candidate	Votes	%
BDP	Ian Khama	Walkover	N/A
Margin of victory		N/A	N/A
Registered electors		6,194	
BDP notional hold			
