= Gaborone Bonnington North =

Parliamentary constituency in Gaborone, 2012 onwards

- Single-member constituency for the National Assembly
- District: Gaborone
- Population: 52,082
- Major settlements: Gaborone
- Area: 20 km^{2}

Current constituency
- Created: 2012
- Party: UDC
- Created from: Gaborone West North
- MP: Maipelo Mophuting
- Margin of victory: 2,565 (21.9 pp)

Gaborone Bonnington North is a constituency in Gaborone represented in the National Assembly of Botswana since 2024 by the assistant Minister for State President, Maipelo Mophuting of the Umbrella for Democratic Change. With an area of 23 km^{2}, Gaborone Bonnington North is the second smallest constituency of Botswana after Gaborone Bonnington South.

== Constituency profile ==
The constituency was created in 2012, from the former Gaborone West North constituency. In the 2014 elections the constituency was won by Duma Boko, leader and presidential candidate of the Umbrella for Democratic Change, who became leader of the Opposition in the National Assembly. In 2019, however, Boko decisively lost his seat to Annah Mokgethi of the Botswana Democratic Party.

The urban constituency encompasses the following locations:

1. Segoditshane
2. Broadhurst
3. Taung
4. Mabudisa Phase 1
5. Ntloedibe Phase II
6. Bokotelo
7. Boseja Block 6
8. Moroka Block 5
9. Ditimamodimo Block 7
10. Feya
11. Central Business District

== Members of Parliament ==
Key: UDC BDP UDC

Election	Winner
2014 election	Duma Boko
2019 election	Anna Mokgethi
2024 election	Maipelo Mophuting

== Election results ==
=== 2024 election ===
General election 2024: Gaborone Bonnington North
Party	Candidate	Votes	%	±%
UDC	Maipelo Mophuting	5,600	47.90	+12.03
BDP	Anna Mokgethi	3,035	25.96	−29.37
BCP	Moiseraele Dibeela	2,714	23.21	N/A
BPF	Ookeditse Malesu	195	1.67	N/A
BMD	Donald Motsumi	148	1.27	N/A
Margin of victory		2,565	21.94	N/A
Total valid votes		11,692	98.95	−0.40
Rejected ballots		124	1.05	+0.40
Turnout		11,816	83.77	−2.96
Registered electors		14,105		
UDC gain from BDP		Swing	+20.70	

=== 2019 election ===
General election 2019: Gaborone Bonnington North
Party	Candidate	Votes	%	±%
BDP	Anna Mokgethi	6,933	55.33	+25.81
UDC	Duma Boko	2,367	35.87	−17.92
AP	Kaelo Molefhe	413	8.35	N/A
RAP	Onkemetse Clark-Lerubisi	56	0.45	N/A
Margin of victory		4,566	19.46	N/A
Total valid votes		12,531	99.35	−0.30
Rejected ballots		52	0.65	+0.30
Turnout		12,583	86.73	+0.78
Registered electors		14,508		
BDP gain from UDC		Swing	+21.87	

=== 2014 election ===
General election 2014: Gaborone Bonnington North
Party	Candidate	Votes	%
UDC	Duma Boko	7,694	53.79
BDP	Robert Masitara	4,222	29.52
BCP	Anna Mokgethi	2,387	16.69
Margin of victory		3,472	27.97
Turnout		14,352	85.95
Registered electors		16,698	
Total valid votes		14,303	99.66
Rejected ballots		49	0.34
UDC win (new seat)			
