= Gomolemo Motswaledi =

Botswana politician and choral musician (1970–2014)

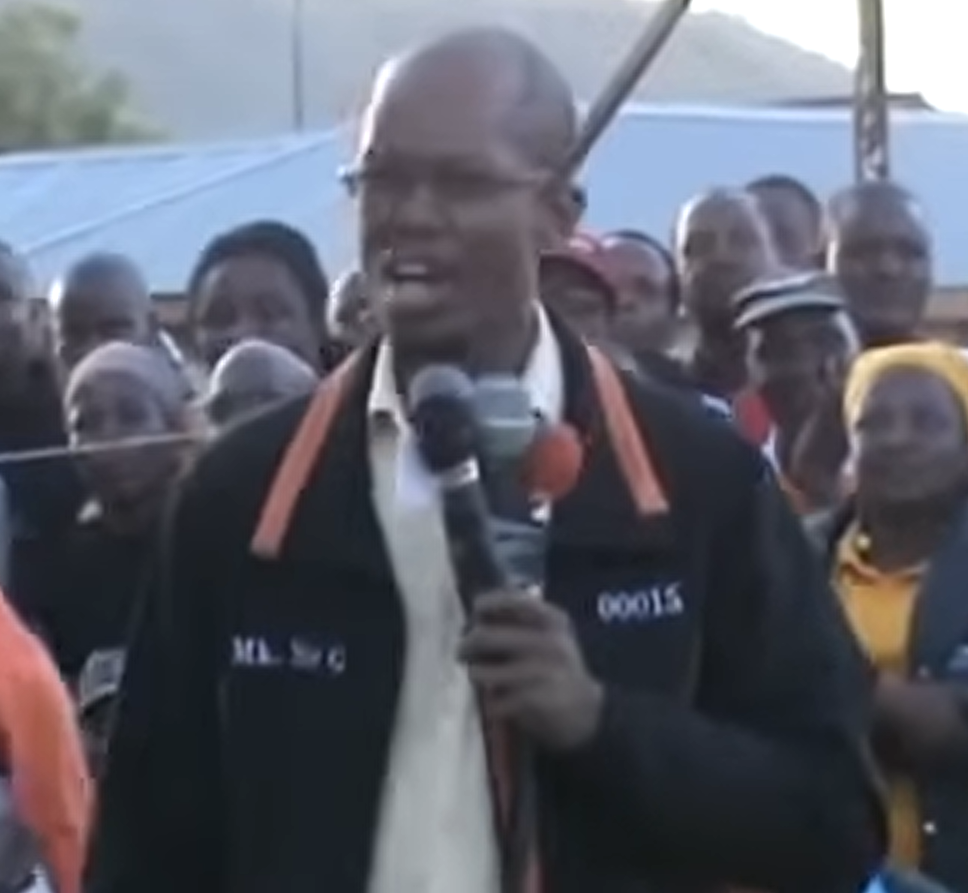
- Motswaledi in 2012

President of the Botswana Movement for Democracy
- In office 1 May 2011 – 30 July 2014
- Preceded by: Position established
- Succeeded by: Ndaba Gaolathe

Secretary-General of the Botswana Democratic Party
- In office 19 July 2009 – 17 August 2009
- Succeeded by: Thato Kwerepe

Personal details
- Born: Gomolemo Thatayaone Motswaledi; 19 June 1970 Mahalapye, Botswana
- Died: 30 July 2014 (aged 44) Near Pitsane, Botswana
- Cause of death: single-vehicle crash
- Resting place: Serowe, Botswana
- Party: Botswana Movement for Democracy (2010–2014)
- Other political affiliations: Botswana Democratic Party (until 2010); Umbrella for Democratic Change (2012–2014)
- Education: University of Botswana (BSocSc)
- Occupation: Politician, composer, choir conductor

Gomolemo Thatayaone Motswaledi (19 June 1970 – 30 July 2014), also known as Sir G, was a Motswana liberal politician and choral musician. He was a founder of the liberal Botswana Movement for Democracy (BMD), leading it initially as interim chairman and subsequently as its first elected president. He also helped establish the Umbrella for Democratic Change (UDC), an opposition coalition in which he served as secretary-general and deputy president.

Previously a youth leader in the Botswana Democratic Party (BDP), Motswaledi became its secretary-general in 2009. A dispute with president Ian Khama led to his suspension and an unsuccessful court challenge concerning Khama's presidential immunity. He left the BDP in 2010. Alongside politics, he founded the Kgalemang Tumediso Motsete (KTM) Choir in 1993 and worked as a composer, arranger and conductor. He died in a road accident in July 2014 while preparing to contest Gaborone Central in the general election later that year.

== Early life and education ==
Motswaledi was born in Mahalapye in 1970 and grew up in Serowe. He was the eldest of three sons. He attended secondary school in Serowe and completed his national service in Shakawe. At the University of Botswana, he obtained a Bachelor of Social Sciences degree in sociology and history, and also took classes in philosophy and theology.

His interests in politics and music developed during childhood. His younger brother Gape recalled that, while still at primary school, Motswaledi attended political meetings and afterwards imitated the speeches and mannerisms of politicians, including Daniel Kwelagobe. After graduating, he became a cultural administrator in the Ministry of Labour and Home Affairs. He worked there for eight years before moving to an administrative position at the University of Botswana.

== Political career ==
=== Botswana Democratic Party ===
At university, Motswaledi joined GS26, the BDP's student organisation. He became its treasurer during his first year and subsequently its chairman. By 2000, he chaired the party's National Youth Executive Committee.

In 2007, he unsuccessfully contested the position of BDP secretary-general against incumbent Jacob Nkate, who defeated him by 49 votes.

Before the 2009 general election, Motswaledi was selected as the BDP's prospective parliamentary candidate for Gaborone Central. He had also expressed interest in the Serowe North West seat vacated when Khama became president in 2008, but the party leadership endorsed Khama's brother Tshekedi Khama for that constituency. At the BDP's congress in Kanye in July 2009, he was elected secretary-general as part of the Barata-Phathi faction associated with Kwelagobe and Ponatshego Kedikilwe. The faction won the contested central committee positions against the A-Team, which had Khama's support. Relations deteriorated after Khama appointed additional members to party committees. Motswaledi questioned the extent of the president's powers to make such appointments.

Another point of dispute was Khama's renewal of the contract of BDP executive secretary Batlang Serema. Motswaledi, who supervised the executive secretary on behalf of the central committee, had not been consulted about the renewal.

=== Suspension and presidential immunity case ===
On 17 August 2009, Khama suspended Motswaledi from the BDP for 60 days pending disciplinary proceedings. The suspension also prevented him from standing as the party's candidate in Gaborone Central in the October election. He was replaced as the constituency's BDP candidate by Kgomotso Mogami.

Motswaledi challenged the suspension in the High Court, seeking to have it set aside. The case, Motswaledi v Botswana Democratic Party and Others, raised the question of whether Khama's constitutional immunity as president of Botswana extended to his actions as president of a political party. The High Court dismissed the application, holding that section 41 of the Constitution of Botswana barred civil proceedings concerning the sitting president's conduct in his private capacity. The judgment was delivered by a bench comprising Chief Justice Julian Nganunu, Ian Kirby and Isaac Lesetedi.

The Court of Appeal upheld the dismissal on 2 October 2009. It rejected the argument that Khama's role as party president constituted a separate capacity outside the immunity provision. The court expressly declined to decide whether the suspension itself was justified, and dismissed the appeal with costs. Following party disciplinary proceedings, Motswaledi received a five-year suspension. Thato Kwerepe replaced him as BDP secretary-general. The litigation also left him liable for substantial legal costs. When the BDP sought his civil imprisonment over unpaid costs, supporters contributed to a fund organised by the BMD to help settle the debt.

In their study of the subsequent BDP split, some academics argued that the immunity provision contributed to the breakaway by preventing Motswaledi and his faction from obtaining judicial redress against Khama's actions within the party.

=== Formation and leadership of the BMD ===
On 20 March 2010, members of the Barata-Phathi faction met in Mogoditshane and decided to establish a new party. Motswaledi resigned from the BDP on 29 April 2010. He criticised what he regarded as a departure from the party's earlier constitutional and democratic practices.

The Botswana Movement for Democracy was publicly launched on 29 May 2010. At its launch rally in Gaborone, Botsalo Ntuane stood down as interim chairman in favour of Motswaledi and became vice-chairman. Motswaledi consequently assumed leadership of the new party.

At the BMD's inaugural national congress in May 2011, held at St Joseph's College, Motswaledi defeated lawyer Sidney Pilane to become the party's first elected president. Ntuane became vice-president, Nehemiah Modubule national chairman and Wynter Mmolotsi secretary-general. After Ntuane returned to the BDP, Ndaba Gaolathe replaced him as BMD vice-president in July 2012.

In a 2013 interview, Motswaledi identified employment, education and living standards as central political concerns. He argued that the economy generated insufficient jobs and that education did not adequately prepare young people for available employment.

=== Umbrella for Democratic Change ===
Motswaledi participated in negotiations to bring opposition parties together ahead of the 2014 election. The BMD, Botswana National Front (BNF) and Botswana People's Party (BPP) formed the Umbrella for Democratic Change in 2012. Earlier negotiations had included the Botswana Congress Party (BCP), which withdrew following disagreements over the allocation of constituencies.

At the coalition's public launch in November 2012, Motswaledi explained that he and BPP leader Motlatsi Molapisi had agreed to support BNF leader Duma Boko as UDC president. Motswaledi served as the coalition's inaugural secretary-general and also as its deputy president. He was the UDC's prospective parliamentary candidate for Gaborone Central, where his opponents were to include BCP leader Dumelang Saleshando and BDP candidate Rupert Hambira.

=== International liberal activities ===
Motswaledi served as vice-president for Southern Africa of the Africa Liberal Network (ALN) and was a close ally of the liberal South African political party. He wrote the network's constitution, which was revised and adopted in Marrakesh on 29 November 2014, after his death.

By April 2014, he was also a vice-president of Liberal International. At its 59th congress in Rotterdam that month, he spoke in an ALN discussion alongside Olivier Kamitatu, Cellou Dalein Diallo and Baroness Falkner. The BMD was admitted to full membership of Liberal International at the congress.

From 2012 to 2014, Britain's Liberal Democrats assisted the BMD through the Westminster Foundation for Democracy. Their support included candidate selection and training, and polling to test campaign messages. The 2014 programme, Building a Blueprint for Best Practice in Sister Party Constituency Campaigning, aimed to help Motswaledi win Gaborone Central. After his death, the programme was redirected towards Ndaba Gaolathe's successful campaign in Gaborone Bonnington South. ALN campaign advisers included Victoria Marsom, the Liberal Democrats' head of strategic seat operations, and Jonathan Moakes, chief executive of South Africa's Democratic Alliance. Their work with the BMD and UDC included a national campaign message, manifesto and constituency strategies.

== Musical career ==
Motswaledi founded the Kgalemang Tumediso Motsete Choir in January 1993. Named after Kgalemang Motsete, the composer of Botswana's national anthem, the ensemble became known as the KTM Choir. Motswaledi composed and arranged music for it and served as its director and conductor.

The choir initially brought together young people from different churches. According to fellow founder Dumi Mmualefhe, its establishment followed discussions with Motswaledi at the University of Botswana in 1992. Motswaledi managed and directed the choir for approximately ten years. A self-taught musician, he combined singing, composition, arranging and conducting, and his colleagues recalled his emphasis on discipline in rehearsals and performance. His compositions frequently concerned Botswana and national identity.

His work with the choir included mentoring performers who subsequently developed individual careers, among them Nnunu Ramogotsi, Punah Gabasiane and Lizibo. He was also involved in establishing the Botswana Musicians Union's awards and served as a chief judge.

He received a presidential honour for his services to the arts before turning 30. His friends subsequently gave him the nickname Sir G.

== Death ==
Motswaledi died on 30 July 2014, aged 44, in a road accident near Pitsane in southern Botswana. His death occurred less than three months before the general election. His uncle Thero Badirwang told Radio Botswana that police had informed the family of the accident and that Motswaledi appeared to have been travelling alone.

The UDC questioned the circumstances of his death and commissioned its own investigation, engaging specialists in pathology, ballistics and accident reconstruction. On 20 August 2014, police commissioner Keabetswe Makgophe announced that the Botswana Police Service's investigation had concluded that Motswaledi died in a road accident without foul play. Boko continued to allege that the accident had been deliberately caused. In October, the Mail & Guardian reported that the UDC had not yet released its private investigators' report.

In July 2015, Gaolathe said that the private investigation remained incomplete and that the material gathered had raised further questions rather than established what had happened. The issue resurfaced in February 2024 when President Mokgweetsi Masisi told Parliament that he intended to pursue the circumstances of Motswaledi's death further.

Following Motswaledi's death, Nick Clegg, the British deputy prime minister and leader of the Liberal Democrats, paid tribute to him in a statement published on 5 August 2014. Clegg recalled meeting Motswaledi at his party's autumn conference in 2012 and pledged to continue working with the BMD in honour of his legacy. A memorial service was held at the University of Botswana Stadium in Gaborone on 6 August 2014. He was buried in Serowe on 8 August.

== Succession and commemoration ==
Gaolathe succeeded Motswaledi as leader of the BMD and as the UDC's deputy leader. Phenyo Butale replaced him as the UDC candidate in Gaborone Central and defeated Saleshando in the October 2014 election.

The Africa Liberal Network established a prize in Motswaledi's name to recognise a young person's contribution to promoting liberalism in Africa. In November 2024, the Botswana Musicians Union posthumously awarded him its Lifetime Achievement Award at a ceremony at the Gaborone International Convention Centre. The KTM Choir continued to perform and commemorate his work, including a tribute concert at Swaneng Hill School in Serowe in June 2026.
