= Ndaba Gaolathe =

Vice President of Botswana since 2024

His Honour Ndaba Gaolathe
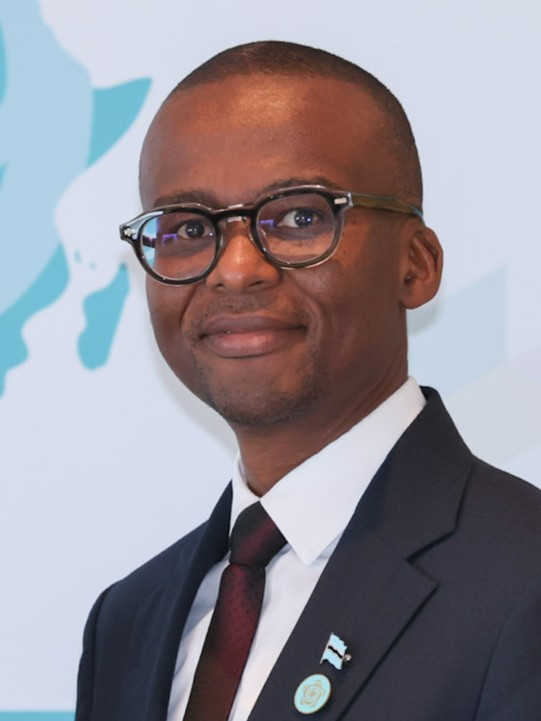
- Gaolathe in 2025

10th Vice-President of Botswana
- Incumbent
- Assumed office 7 November 2024
- President: Duma Boko
- Preceded by: Slumber Tsogwane

Minister of Finance
- Incumbent
- Assumed office 11 November 2024
- President: Duma Boko
- Preceded by: Peggy Serame

Vice President of the Umbrella for Democratic Change
- Incumbent
- Assumed office 20 May 2024
- Preceded by: Dumelang Saleshando

Member of Parliament for Gaborone Bonnington South
- Incumbent
- Assumed office 7 November 2024
- Preceded by: Christian Greef
- Majority: 5,674 (41.07%)
- In office 28 October 2014 – 28 August 2019
- Preceded by: constituency established
- Succeeded by: Christian Greef

Personal details
- Born: 5 September 1971 (age 55) Gaborone, Botswana
- Party: Alliance for Progressives
- Other political affiliations: Umbrella for Democratic Change
- Education: George Washington University (BSc); University of Pennsylvania (MBA)
- Alma mater: George Washington University
- Occupation: Economist

Ndaba Nkosinathi Gaolathe (born 5 September 1972) is a Motswana economist and politician, currently serving as Vice-President of Botswana and Minister of Finance since 7 November 2024, under President Duma Boko. Gaolathe is the leader of the Alliance for Progressives, one of the parties within the ruling coalition Umbrella for Democratic Change (UDC). He is also an elected member of the National Assembly of Botswana for the Gaborone Bonnington South constituency since the 2024 elections, a position he previously held from 2014 to 2019.

== Biography ==
=== Early life and education ===
Gaolathe was born on the 5th of September 1972 in Gaborone, the son of Baledzi Gaolathe, who served as Botswana's minister of finance from 1999 to 2009 under presidents Festus Mogae and Ian Khama. He attended Lesedi Primary School and Gaborone Secondary School before studying economics at George Washington University in the United States, followed by an MBA in finance at the Wharton School of the University of Pennsylvania, completing his studies in 1997.

=== Political career ===
Originally a member of the Botswana Democratic Party (BDP), which had governed since independence in 1966, Gaolathe left the party during Ian Khama's presidency, joining the Botswana Movement for Democracy (BMD), founded by Gomolemo Motswaledi. Gaolathe became a prominent leader within the BMD and played a key role in incorporating the party into the Umbrella for Democratic Change (UDC) alliance, alongside the Botswana National Front (BNF) and the Botswana People's Party (BPP), two other opposition parties to the BDP. Following the sudden death of Motswaledi in a car accident in 2014, Gaolathe succeeded him as party leader and ran as the running mate to Duma Boko (leader of the BNF and UDC) in that year's general election, where the UDC placed second. Gaolathe was elected as a member of parliament for Gaborone Bonnington South.

In July 2017, amid an internal conflict within the BMD, Gaolathe left the UDC and was expelled from the party, subsequently founding the Alliance for Progressives, a socially liberal party he has led since. Gaolathe ran as the AP's presidential candidate in the 2019 general election, placing third with 5.12% of the popular vote but losing his parliamentary seat.

=== Vice President of Botswana ===
Gaolathe initiated talks to form an alliance with the Botswana Congress Party (BCP), led by Dumelang Saleshando, ahead of the 2024 elections. After these talks failed, the AP decided to rejoin the UDC, and Gaolathe resumed his role as the coalition's second-in-command, essentially becoming Boko's de facto running mate in the elections. Following the UDC's decisive victory, which marked the BDP's first-ever defeat and Boko's ascent to the presidency, Gaolathe, who regained his parliamentary seat, was seen as the most likely candidate for the vice president position in Boko's cabinet. On November 4, days after taking office, Boko confirmed Gaolathe as his vice president.

== Electoral history ==
General election 2014: Gaborone Bonnington South
Party	Candidate	Votes	%
UDC	Ndaba Gaolathe	6,646	57.49
BDP	Botsalo Ntuane	3,597	31.11
BCP	Abbey Buti Chengeta	1.318	11.40
Margin of victory		3,049	26.38
Turnout		11,595	83.95%
Registered electors		13,811	
Total valid votes		11,561	99.71
Rejected ballots		34	0.29
UDC win (new seat)			

General election 2019: Gaborone Bonnington South
Party	Candidate	Votes	%	±%
BDP	Christian Ntuba Greef	4,603	43.90	+12.79
AP	Ndaba Gaolathe	3,461	33.01	−24.48
UDC	Nelson Ramaotwana	2,367	22.57	−34.92
RAP	Gaolathe Mokgosi	29	0.29	N/A
BMD	Jopa Osupile	26	0.25	N/A
Margin of victory		1,142	10.89	+17.08
Total valid votes		10,486	99.65	−0.06
Rejected ballots		37	0.35	+0.06
Turnout		10,523	84.01	+0.06
Registered electors		12,526		
BDP gain from UDC		Swing	+18.64	

General election 2024: Gaborone Bonnington South
Party	Candidate	Votes	%	±%
UDC	Ndaba Gaolathe	8,805	63.73	+41.16
BDP	Christian Ntuba Greef	3,131	22.66	−21.24
BCP	Montwedi Muzila	1,731	12.53	N/A
BPF	Evidence Ronald	83	0.60	N/A
BMD	Thongbotho Morupisi	67	0.48	+0.23
Margin of victory		5,674	41.07	N/A
Total valid votes		13,817	99.67	+0.02
Rejected ballots		46	0.33	−0.02
Turnout		13,863	80.85	−3.16
Registered electors		17,147		
UDC gain from BDP		Swing	+31.20	
