= Gaborone Bonnington South =

Parliamentary constituency in Gaborone, 2012 onwards

- Single-member constituency for the National Assembly
- District: Gaborone
- Population: 49,965
- Major settlements: Gaborone
- Area: 19 km^{2}

Current constituency
- Created: 2012
- Created from: Gaborone West North
- MP: Ndaba Gaolathe
- Margin of victory: 5,674 (41.1 pp)

Gaborone Bonnington South is a constituency in Gaborone represented in the National Assembly of Botswana by Ndaba Gaolathe, the Vice-President of Botswana since 2024. With 19 km^{2}, Gaborone Bonnington South is the smallest constituency of Botswana.

== Constituency profile ==
The constituency was created in 2012, from the former Gaborone West South constituency. In 2014 it was won by the Umbrella for Democratic Change candidate, Ndaba Gaolathe. In 2019, following Gaolathe's defection from UDC to found the Alliance for Progressives, he lost the seat to Botswana Democratic Party candidate Christian Ntuba Greef in a three-horse race.

The urban constituency encompasses the following locations:

1. Difetlhamolelo Block 9
2. Mafikana Phase 4
3. Madirelo
4. Mabudisa Phase 1
5. Mafatswa
6. Kgale View

== Members of Parliament ==
Key: UDC BDP UDC

| Election | Winner |
|---|---|
| 2014 election | Ndaba Gaolathe |
| 2019 election | Christian Ntuba Greef |
| 2024 election | Ndaba Gaolathe |

== Election results ==
=== 2024 election ===
General election 2024: Gaborone Bonnington South
| Party | Candidate | Votes | % | ±% |
|---|---|---|---|---|
| UDC | Ndaba Gaolathe | 8,805 | 63.73 | +41.16 |
| BDP | Christian Ntuba Greef | 3,131 | 22.66 | −21.24 |
| BCP | Montwedi Muzila | 1,731 | 12.53 | N/A |
| BPF | Evidence Ronald | 83 | 0.60 | N/A |
| BMD | Thongbotho Morupisi | 67 | 0.48 | +0.23 |
| Margin of victory | | 5,674 | 41.07 | N/A |
| Total valid votes | | 13,817 | 99.67 | +0.02 |
| Rejected ballots | | 46 | 0.33 | −0.02 |
| Turnout | | 13,863 | 80.85 | −3.16 |
| Registered electors | | 17,147 | | |
| UDC gain from BDP | | Swing | +31.20 | |

=== 2019 election ===
General election 2019: Gaborone Bonnington South
| Party | Candidate | Votes | % | ±% |
|---|---|---|---|---|
| BDP | Christian Ntuba Greef | 4,603 | 43.90 | +12.79 |
| AP | Ndaba Gaolathe | 3,461 | 33.01 | −24.48 |
| UDC | Nelson Ramaotwana | 2,367 | 22.57 | −34.92 |
| RAP | Gaolathe Mokgosi | 29 | 0.29 | N/A |
| BMD | Jopa Osupile | 26 | 0.25 | N/A |
| Margin of victory | | 1,142 | 10.89 | +17.08 |
| Total valid votes | | 10,486 | 99.65 | −0.06 |
| Rejected ballots | | 37 | 0.35 | +0.06 |
| Turnout | | 10,523 | 84.01 | +0.06 |
| Registered electors | | 12,526 | | |
| BDP gain from UDC | | Swing | +18.64 | |

=== 2014 election ===
General election 2014: Gaborone Bonnington South
| Party | Candidate | Votes | % |
|---|---|---|---|
| UDC | Ndaba Gaolathe | 6,646 | 57.49 |
| BDP | Botsalo Ntuane | 3,597 | 31.11 |
| BCP | Abbey Buti Chengeta | 1.318 | 11.40 |
| Margin of victory | | 3,049 | 26.38 |
| Turnout | | 11,595 | 83.95% |
| Registered electors | | 13,811 | |
| Total valid votes | | 11,561 | 99.71 |
| Rejected ballots | | 34 | 0.29 |
| UDC win (new seat) | | | |
