= Botsalo Ntuane =

Motswana politician (born 1971)

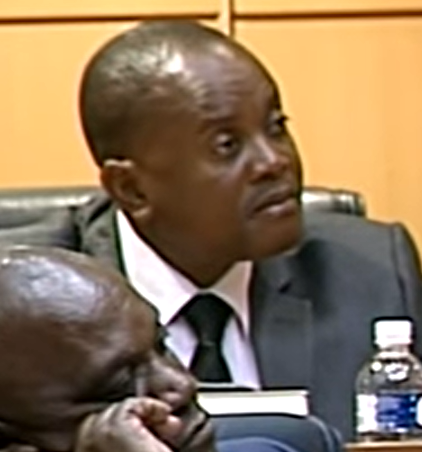
- Ntuane in 2013

Leader of the Opposition
- In office 5 August 2010 – 12 July 2012
- Preceded by: Olebile Gaborone
- Succeeded by: Dumelang Saleshando

Vice President of the Botswana Movement for Democracy
- In office 1 May 2011 – 19 June 2012
- Preceded by: Office established
- Succeeded by: Ndaba Gaolathe

Member of Parliament for Gaborone West South
- In office 16 October 2009 – 29 August 2014
- Preceded by: Robert Molefhabangwe
- Succeeded by: Constituency abolished

Secretary-General of the Botswana Democratic Party
- In office 4 July 2015 – 8 July 2017
- President: Ian Khama
- Preceded by: Mpho Balopi
- Succeeded by: Mpho Balopi

Personal details
- Born: 11 March 1971 (age 55) Botswana
- Party: Botswana Democratic Party
- Other political affiliations: Botswana Movement for Democracy (2010-2012)
- Spouse: Mpho Ntuane (m. 2011)
- Education: University of Botswana; University of Leicester

Botsalo Ntuane (born 11 March 1971) is a Motswana politician who served as a Member of Parliament from 2004 to 2014, including as Leader of the Opposition from 2010 to 2012. He entered Parliament as a specially elected member in 2004 and was elected to represent Gaborone West South in 2009. A longtime member of the Botswana Democratic Party (BDP), Ntuane left the party during its 2010 split and became one of the founding leaders of the Botswana Movement for Democracy (BMD), where he served as vice-president. He returned to the BDP in 2012 and later served as the party's secretary-general from 2015 to 2017.

== Political career ==
=== Early political career and Parliament ===
Ntuane became involved in politics while a student at the University of Botswana in the early 1990s, where he was active in the Botswana Democratic Party (BDP). During the presidency of Quett Masire, Ntuane was appointed as a specially nominated member of the BDP central committee. Ntuane subsequently served as executive secretary of the party.

Following the 2004 general election, Ntuane was nominated by President Festus Mogae as one of the specially elected members of the National Assembly. He remained a specially elected member until the 2009 general election.

In the 2009 general election, Ntuane contested Gaborone West South as the BDP candidate and was elected to the National Assembly. He received 4,669 votes, defeating candidates from the Botswana Congress Party (BCP), Botswana National Front (BNF) and independent candidate Robert Molefhabangwe.

=== Botswana Movement for Democracy and Leader of the Opposition ===
In 2010, Ntuane left the Botswana Democratic Party amid internal divisions within the party and became one of the founding members of the Botswana Movement for Democracy (BMD). He initially served as chairman of the BMD's interim executive committee. In May 2010, he stepped down from the position to make way for Gomolemo Motswaledi and became vice-chairman.

Following the formation of the BMD and the movement of several members of Parliament to the new party, Ntuane became Leader of the Opposition in the National Assembly in 2010. At the BMD's inaugural national congress in May 2011, Motswaledi was elected president while Ntuane was elected vice-president unopposed.

In June 2012, Ntuane resigned from the BMD and rejoined the BDP, ending his tenure as BMD vice-president and Leader of the Opposition.

=== Return to the Botswana Democratic Party ===
After returning to the BDP in 2012, Ntuane contested Gaborone Bonnington South in the 2014 general election, following the delimitation of constituencies ahead of the election. in the 2014 general election. He was defeated by Ndaba Gaolathe of the Umbrella for Democratic Change (UDC), receiving 3,597 votes to Gaolathe's 6,646.

Following the election, Ntuane remained active within the BDP. In 2015, he contested the position of party secretary-general at the BDP national congress in Mmadinare. He defeated Gaotlhaetse Matlhabaphiri by 724 votes to 180 and was elected secretary-general.

Ntuane sought re-election as secretary-general at the BDP congress in 2017, but was defeated by Mpho Balopi, who received 662 votes to Ntuane's 234. His defeat ended his two-year tenure as secretary-general.

=== Later activities ===
In February 2019, Ntuane resigned from the BDP central committee, where he had served as an additional member following his defeat in the 2017 secretary-general election. He said that his position in the party was limiting his ability to undertake election-observation work with non-state organisations. Ntuane had participated in election observation missions since 2006 and had served as a team leader on an observer mission for the 2018 elections in the Democratic Republic of the Congo.

== Personal life ==
Ntuane married his longtime partner, Mpho Masome, in November 2011.
