= Christian Ntuba Greef =

Motswana politician

Member of the Parliament of Botswana
- In office 5 November 2019 – 5 September 2024
- President: Mokgweetsi Masisi
- Preceded by: Ndaba Gaolathe
- Succeeded by: Ndaba Gaolathe
- Constituency: Gaborone Bonnington South

Personal details
- Party: Botswana Democratic Party

Christian Ntuba Greef is a Motswana politician and former Member of Parliament for Gaborone Bonnington South.
