= Tshekedi Khama II =

Botswana politician

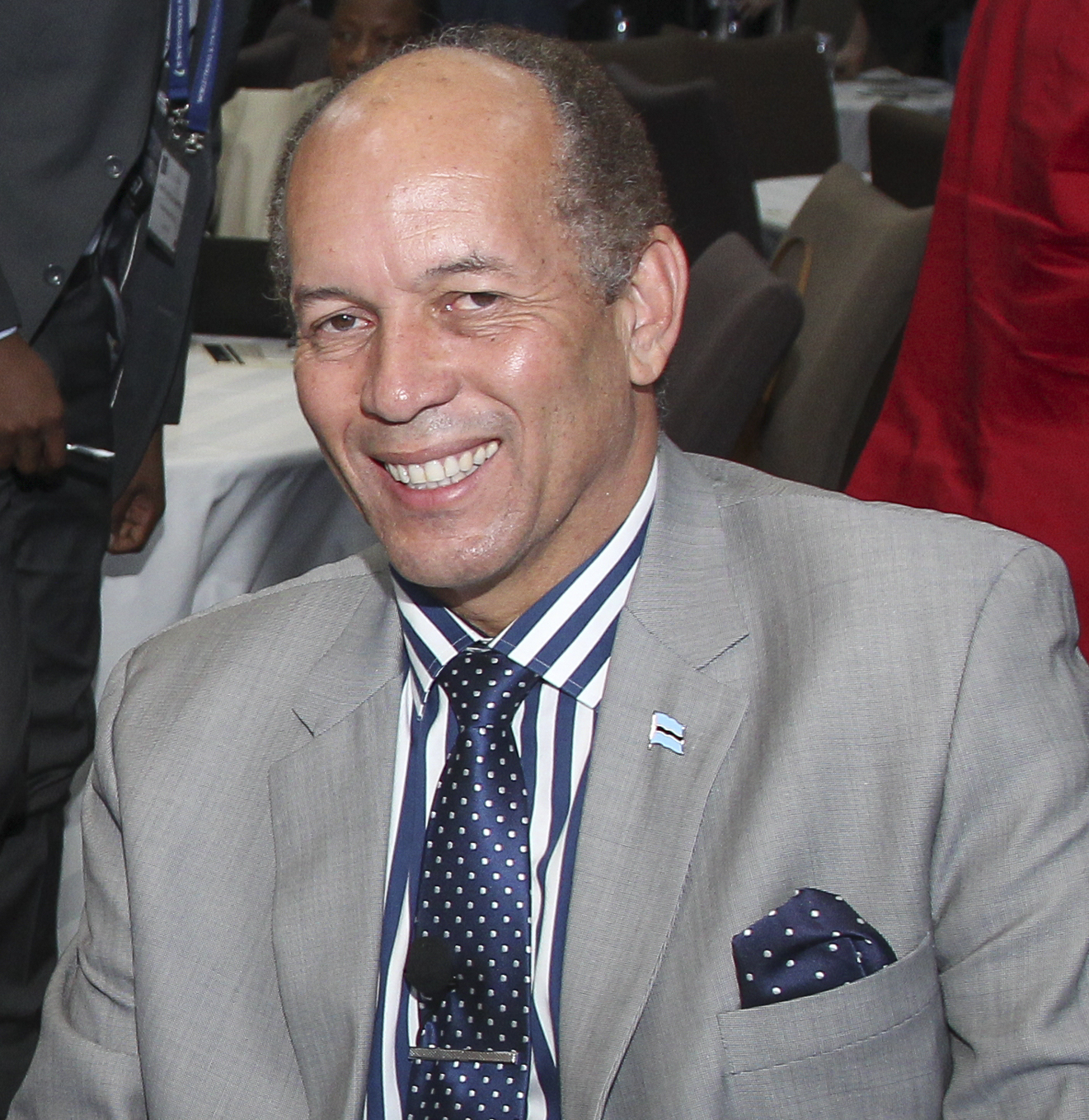

Minister of Environment, Conservation, Natural Resources and Tourism
- In office 2012–2018
- President: Ian Khama; Mokgweetsi Masisi
- Preceded by: Kitso Mokaila

Minister of Youth Empowerment, Sports and Culture Development
- In office 2018–2019
- President: Mokgweetsi Masisi
- Preceded by: Thapelo Olopeng

Member of Parliament for Serowe West
- In office 28 July 2008 – 21 April 2023
- Preceded by: Ian Khama
- Succeeded by: Onalepelo Kedikilwe

Personal details
- Born: Tshekedi Stanford Khama; 9 June 1958 (age 68) Serowe, Bechuanaland
- Party: Botswana Democratic Party (until 2019); Botswana Patriotic Front (2019–)
- Spouse: Thea Khama
- Children: Tahlia Khama; Kaedi Khama
- Parent(s): Seretse Khama; Ruth Williams Khama
- Relatives: Jacqueline Khama Ian Khama (brother) Anthony Khama
- Education: Institute of Development Management (Diploma)

Tshekedi Stanford Khama (born 9 June 1958) is a Motswana politician. He was MP for Serowe West from 2008 to 21 April 2023. He was automatically disqualified from the National Assembly after missing two consecutive sessions because of his self-imposed exile to South Africa.

== Biography ==
Khama is one of four children of the first President of Botswana, Seretse Khama and Ruth Williams Khama, and is the brother of former president Ian Khama.

=== Political career ===
Khama was elected to the National Assembly in Serowe North West in a 2008 by-election for Serowe North West after the seat went vacant when his brother became president as a Botswana Democratic Party (BDP) member. He was subsequently re-elected in 2009 and 2014. From 2012 until 2018 he was Minister of Environment, Conservation, Natural Resources and Tourism. In 2018, President Mokgweetsi Masisi made him Minister of Youth Empowerment, Sports and Culture Development.

Prior to the 2019 general elections, he left the BDP to join the new Botswana Patriotic Front (BPF), and was one of three BPF candidates elected.

== Arrest and exile ==
In March 2022 his brother, Ian Khama, stated that Mokgweetsi Masisi had ordered the detention of Tshekedi and that the Directorate of Intelligence and Security had Tshekedi in custody. It was later confirmed he was arrested alongside his brother Anthony and Tshekedi's wife Thea for alleged corrupt deals by their company Seleka Springs. The company was stated to do business with the Botswana Defence Force, and the Seleka Springs' office became the place for the BPF secretariat, where membership cards were printed out. After being released, they travelled to South Africa to Ian where Tshekedi has been in self-imposed exile since then. He crossed through the pioneer border gate near Lobatse. Moatholdi, after Tshekedi had missed 2 parliamentary meetings, stated he attempted to reach him in South Africa through MP Leepetswe Lesedi but never got a response. He responded by stating that on 23 March 2023 he had notified the speaker of threats of detention by the DIS.
