= Ian Kirby =

President of the Botswana Court of Appeal

Ian Kirby (born 1945) is a former president of the Botswana Court of Appeal and a former Attorney General of Botswana.
