= Botswana Movement for Democracy =

Political party in Botswana

- Leader: Julius Baitumetse
- Founded: 29 May 2010
- Split from: Botswana Democratic Party
- Ideology: National conservatism Right-wing populism Christian right Anti-LGBT sentiment Historical: Liberalism
- Political position: Right-wing; Historical: Centre
- National affiliation: None; Formerly: Umbrella for Democratic Change (2012–2018)
- Continental affiliation: Africa Liberal Network
- National Assembly: 0 / 61

The Botswana Movement for Democracy (BMD) is a political party in Botswana, founded in 2010 by MPs and other politicians who parted ways with the ruling Botswana Democratic Party (BDP) due to differences with Ian Khama, the leader of the BDP and the President of Botswana at the time.

It marked a significant break from the BDP, which had held power in Botswana since the country's independence in 1966. The inaugural congress of the BMD took place on May 2, 2011, during which Gomolemo Motswaledi was elected as its first leader. Botsalo Ntuane, then-Gaborone West South constituency MP and Leader of the Opposition in Parliament, assumed the role of party Vice President. Sydney Pilane, who had been the party's Public Relations Officer since its inception, lost his bid for Party President to Motswaledi. The primary objective was to remove the existing "undemocratic" Khama-led government through constitutional and democratic means, with the aim of restoring and promoting a united, non-racial, non-sexist, and democratic Botswana.

In preparation for the 2014 general election, the BMD joined forces with the Umbrella for Democratic Change (UDC) alliance, ultimately becoming the country's second-largest party, with nine of its candidates securing seats in Parliament. However, in 2018, the BMD was expelled from the UDC after it refused to relinquish certain constituencies that had been allocated to the Botswana Congress Party following its entry into the alliance.

Initially liberal in orientation, the party shifted to right-wing populist and Christian-conservative discourse in 2023 after Thuso Tiego became party leader.

In 2025, Tiego resigned as president of the party, and relinquished his membership. Julius Baitumetse was appointed Party President after Tiego's resignation.

== History ==
=== Early years and growth (2010–2017) ===
The Botswana Movement for Democracy (BMD) came into existence in 2010, following the departure of several key figures, most notably Gomolemo Motswaledi (who would later become the inaugural president of BMD) and Ndaba Gaolathe, from the Botswana Democratic Party (BDP). Their departure from the BDP was prompted by conflicts with the party's leader and then-President of Botswana, Ian Khama. Gaolathe had previously served as an advisor and scriptwriter for President Mogae, and he also played a crucial role as the chairman of Gomolemo Motswaledi's 2008 campaign for the Gaborone Central parliamentary seat.

In 2009, Motswaledi assumed the role of Secretary General of the BDP's Central Committee. However, during the same year, he faced charges of non-cooperation with the party's leadership, which led to his suspension from the party and his removal as a candidate for the Gaborone Central parliamentary seat. Meanwhile, Gaolathe faced his own set of challenges, being charged with speaking out against the leadership of the country, particularly in the aftermath of the extrajudicial killing of John Kalafatis by Botswana Defence Force soldiers, whom were later pardoned by President Ian Khama. These charges resulted in his suspension from the BDP.

The formation of the BMD was motivated by the shared goal of safeguarding civil liberties and democratic values that its founders believed were under threat during Khama's presidency. This objective was articulated in the BMD's constitution:

[The BMD] was founded in April 2010 to defend and advance the rights of the peoples of Botswana during and in order to interrupt and reverse the progressive destruction of their independence and the creation of what, by most accounts, threatens to be an authoritarian government.

— BMD Constitution

In 2012, the BMD collaborated with the Botswana National Front (BNF) and the Botswana People's Party (BPP) to establish the Umbrella for Democratic Change (UDC). Just before the 2014 elections, President Motswaledi lost his life in a car accident, and he was succeeded by Ndaba Gaolathe, who was then the BMD's policy director. The party received funding and campaign strategies from its liberal sister parties, the UK Liberal Democrats and the South African Democratic Alliance in the buildup to the 2014 election. In the 2014 election, the UDC secured 17 out of 57 seats in the National Assembly, with the BDP winning 37 seats and the Botswana Congress Party (BCP) winning three. Within the UDC's 17 seats, the BMD claimed nine. The coalition partners allocated constituencies among themselves, permitting members of the coalition to campaign under their respective party banners. This arrangement allowed members to maintain their allegiance to their individual political parties and, presumably, their party's ideological stances, despite their participation in the coalition.

=== Party split and decline (2017–2023) ===
However, tensions came to a head in 2017 during the BMD's elective congress in Bobonong, resulting in a violent conflict in which participants employed rocks as weapons. This internal strife led to the party's division into two factions. Sidney Pilane assumed leadership of one faction, retaining control of the BMD while remaining within the UDC. In contrast, Ndaba Gaolathe led the other faction, which subsequently formed the social-liberal party, Alliance for Progressives (AP). Following the split, the AP carried seven of the BMD's nine MPs with it. Pilane assumed the presidency of the reconstituted BMD, while Gaolathe became the AP's president. The BMD went on to suffer its worst election result to date, losing all its two parliamentary seats and all but one councillor in the 2019 general election.

=== Tiego leadership and rightward shift (2023–2025) ===
On September 9, 2023, Thuso Tiego, a prominent figure in Botswana and a Reverend renowned for his provocative actions, such as leading marches to the President's residence demanding his resignation due to what he perceived as a grave mishandling of the COVID-19 pandemic in Botswana, assumed leadership of the party. Reverend Tiego is notable for his anti-LGBT rhetoric and xenophobic sentiments, which have manifested in his protests in front of foreign-owned shops, attributing the country's high unemployment rate to foreigners who have supposedly taken jobs that should be reserved for locals, temporarily causing closures. Additionally, he laments that Botswana is a secular state in its constitution. Reverend Tiego has taken on the responsibility of revitalizing the party and aimed to fulfill the vision of the late Motswaledi within a 100-day timeframe after taking over the party saying that he has a "divine call" to answer. He stated that the BMD will not engage in cooperation with any other opposition parties.

== Electoral history ==
=== National Assembly ===
Election	Party leader	Votes	%	Seats	+/–	Position	Result
2014	Ndaba Gaolathe	73,697	10.68%	9 / 57	New	2nd	Opposition
2019	Sidney Pilane	2,058	0.27%	0 / 57	▼2 (Note: During the 2014–19 parliamentary term, 7 of the 9 BMD MPs left the party and joined the newly formed Alliance for Progressives.)	▼7th	Extra-parliamentary
2024	Thuso Tiego	1,146	0.14%	0 / 61	0	▲6th	Extra-parliamentary

=== Local elections ===
Election	Votes	%	Seats
2019	7,586	0.99%	1 / 490
