= 2019 Botswana general election =

- 23 October 2019

57 of the 65 seats in the National Assembly 29 seats needed for a majority
- Registered: 925,478
- Turnout: 84.06% (of registered voters) (▼0.69pp); 48.86% (of eligible population) (▼6.27pp) (Note: National Study On Voter Apathy in Botswana (PDF). University of Botswana. IEC Botswana. 2022. p. 17.)
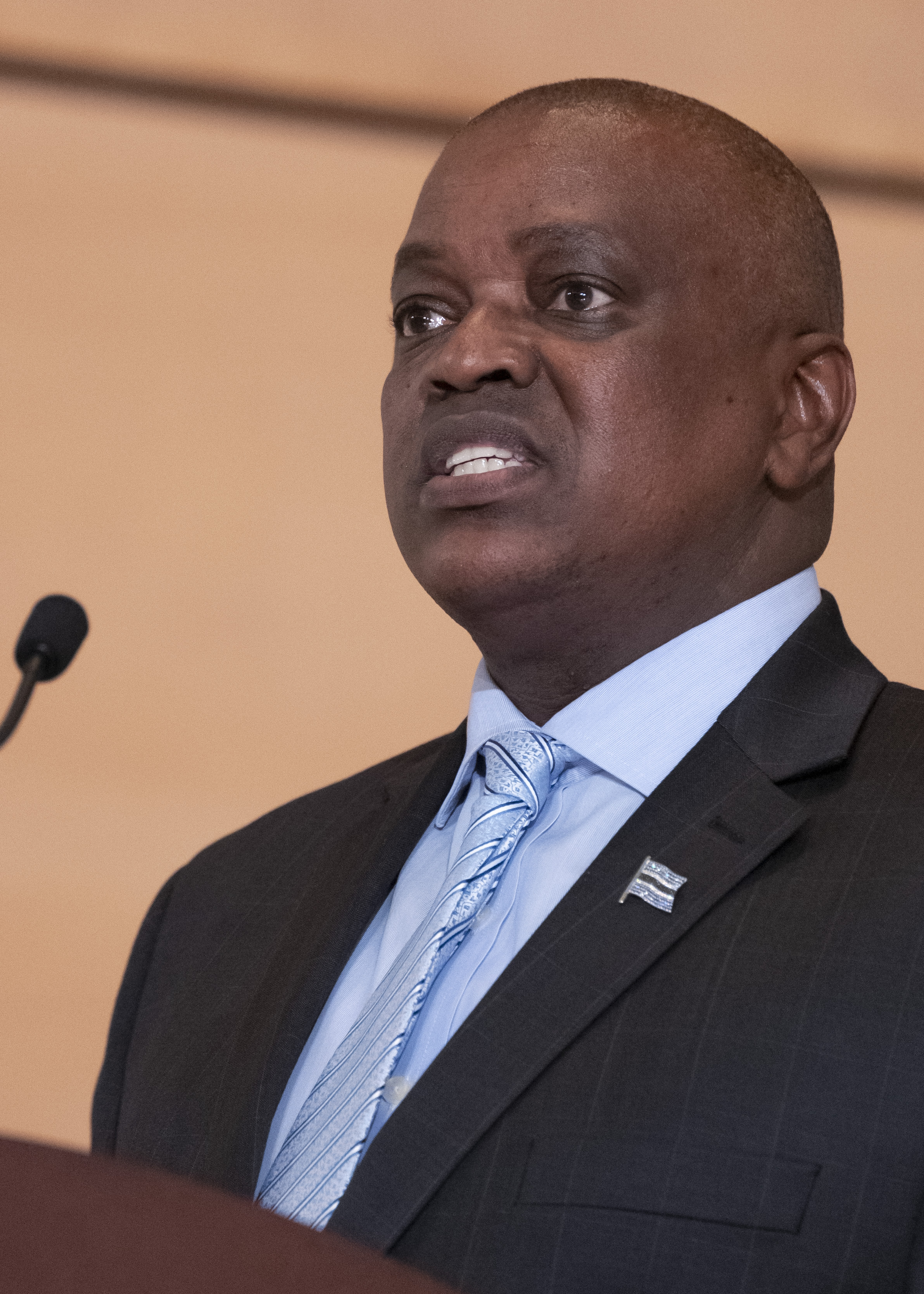

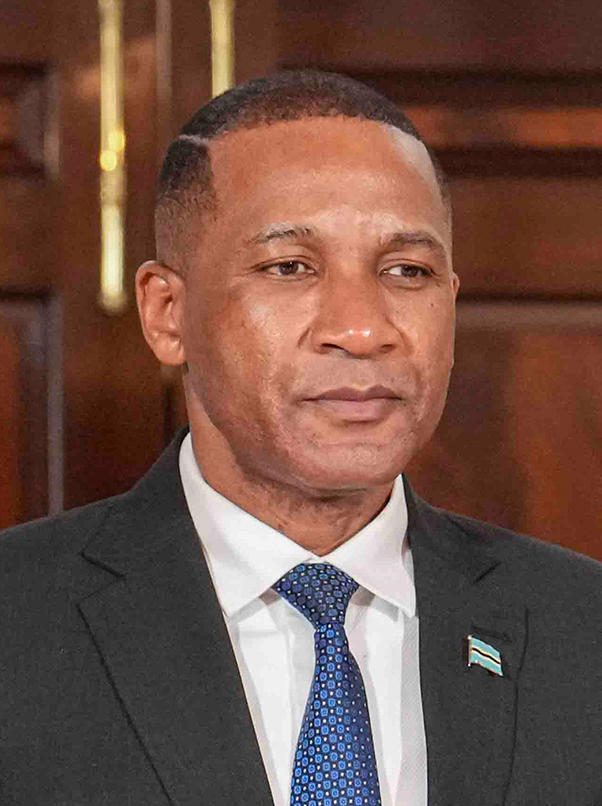

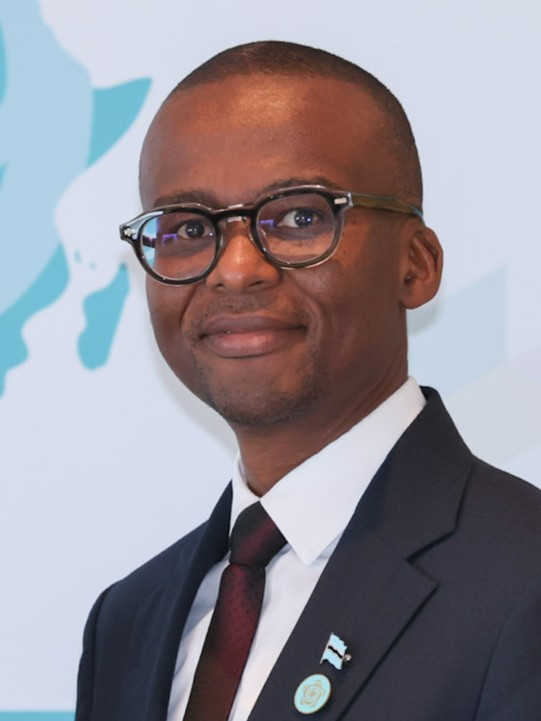
	First party	Second party
Leader	Mokgweetsi Masisi	Duma Boko
Party	BDP	UDC
Leader's seat	None (Note: Incumbent presidents are ineligible to contest National Assembly seats; instead, they serve as ex-officio members of Parliament.)	Gaborone Bonnington North (defeated)
Last election	46.45%, 37 seats	30.01%, 17 seats
Seats won	38	15
Seat change	▲1	▼3 (Note: During the 2014–19 parliamentary term, the Botswana Movement for Democracy (2 seats) left the UDC, whilst the Botswana Congress Party (3 seats) joined the UDC, resulting in the UDC holding 18 seats prior to the election)
Popular vote	406,561	277,071
Percentage	52.65%	35.88%
Swing	▲6.20pp	▲5.87pp
	Third party	Fourth party
	BPF
Leader	Biggie Butale	Ndaba Gaolathe
Party	BPF	AP
Leader's seat	Tati West (defeated)	Gaborone Bonnington South (defeated)
Last election	–	–
Seats won	3	1
Seat change	New	New
Popular vote	34,068	39,561
Percentage	4.41%	5.12%
Swing	New	New
- Winning party shaded by vote share in each constituency
President before election
Mokgweetsi Masisi
BDP
Elected President
Mokgweetsi Masisi
BDP

General elections were held in Botswana on 23 October 2019 to elect MPs and local government councillors. Despite a high profile split in the ruling Botswana Democratic Party (BDP) in May 2019 when former President Ian Khama left the party and switched his support to the new Botswana Patriotic Front, the BDP's vote share increased to almost 53% as the party won 38 of the 57 elected seats in the National Assembly, a gain of one compared to the 2014 elections. The elections were the twelfth straight victory for the BDP. As of 2026, this was the last time the BDP won a general election.

== Background ==
Following the 2014 elections, there were two opposing factions in parliament: the Umbrella for Democratic Change (an alliance of the Botswana National Front, the Botswana Movement for Democracy and the Botswana People's Party), and the Botswana Congress Party (BCP). In February 2017, the Botswana Congress Party (BCP) also joined the Umbrella for Democratic Change, uniting all parliamentary opposition parties. However, in October 2017, the Alliance for Progressives, led by Ndaba Gaolathe, broke away from the Botswana Movement for Democracy (BMD). The BMD was expelled from the coalition in October 2018 after it refused to give up contesting constituencies that had originally been allocated to other alliance partners.

On 1 April 2018, Mokgweetsi Masisi of the Botswana Democratic Party (BDP) was sworn in as Botswana's fifth president, replacing Ian Khama. The BDP held its primary elections on 20 January and 25 August 2018 to select its candidates, with over 1,300 candidates running to be selected to contest the general elections. Following a falling out with Masisi, Khama left the BDP in May 2019 and announced that he would campaign against his former party in support of the Botswana Patriotic Front.

== Electoral system ==
The 65 members of the National Assembly consisted of 57 MPs elected in single-member constituencies by first-past-the-post, six members appointed by the governing party, and two ex-officio members (the President and speaker).

Voters were required to be citizens of Botswana and at least 18 years old, and have been resident in the country for at least 12 months prior to voter registration. People who were declared insane, held dual citizenship, were under a death sentence, had been convicted of an electoral offence or imprisoned for at least six months were not allowed to vote. Candidates had to be citizens of Botswana, at least 21 years old, without an undischarged bankruptcy and be able to speak and read English sufficiently well to take part in parliamentary proceedings.

Several proposed amendments to the Electoral Law, including the introduction of electronic voting and an increase in nomination fees, were dropped in September 2018.

Election day and the two following days were declared public holidays.

== Results ==
Party or alliance		Votes	%	Seats	+/–
Botswana Democratic Party		406,561	52.65	38	+1
Umbrella for Democratic; Change	Botswana National Front	148,122	19.18	4	–4
Umbrella for Democratic; Change	Botswana Congress Party	112,479	14.57	11	+8
Umbrella for Democratic; Change	Botswana People's Party	16,470	2.13	0	0
Umbrella for Democratic; Change	Total	277,071	35.88	15	–2
Botswana Patriotic Front		34,068	4.41	3	New
Alliance for Progressives		39,561	5.12	1	New
Botswana Movement for Democracy		2,058	0.27	0	–9
Real Alternative Party		145	0.02	0	New
Independents		12,694	1.64	0	0
Appointed and ex officio members				8	+2
Total		772,158	100.00	65	0
Valid votes		772,158	99.21		
Invalid/blank votes		6,185	0.79		
Total votes		778,343	100.00		
Registered voters/turnout		925,478	84.10		
Source: IEC

== Aftermath ==
African Union and SADC called the elections free and fair, but criticized the lack of indelible ink and translucent ballot boxes at the polling stations. International observers declared the election to be "free and fair".

However, in November 2019 opposition leader Duma Boko claimed that there had been "massive electoral discrepancies" and stated that he planned to challenge the results in court. The appeal was initially dismissed by the High Court in December, but Boko appealed successfully to the Court of Appeal in early January 2020. However, in the full hearing in late January, the Court of Appeal dismissed the petitions on the basis that it did not have sufficient jurisdiction to hear them.

== See also ==
- 12th Parliament of Botswana
