= Botswana Patriotic Front =

Political party in Botswana

- Leader: Gaolathe Galebotswe
- Chairperson: Oboetswe Gabotlale
- Founded: July 2019
- Split from: Botswana Democratic Party
- Ideology: Populism
- Political position: Big tent
- National affiliation: Umbrella for Democratic Change (2022–2024)
- National Assembly: 5 / 61
- Councillors: 42 / 609
- Pan African Parliament: 0 / 5

Election symbol
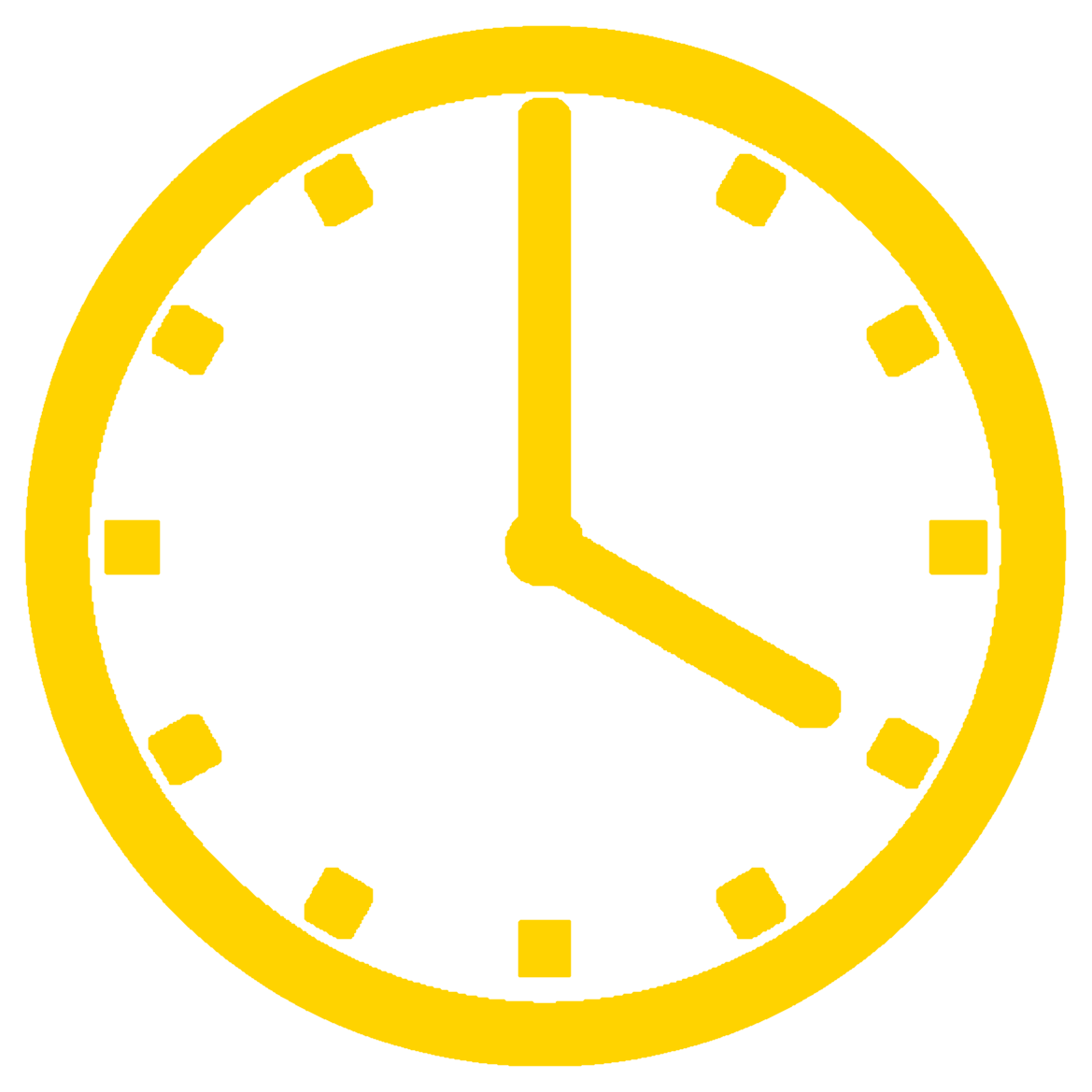

Website
- www.bpf-party.co.bw

The Botswana Patriotic Front (BPF) is a populist political party in Botswana formed in July 2019 by members of the Botswana Democratic Party who split from the party because of a high-profile rivalry between former presidents Ian Khama and Mokgweetsi Masisi.

== History ==
The party was officially launched in July 2019 as a split from the ruling Botswana Democratic Party (BDP). It was backed by former president and BDP leader Ian Khama after he left the party.

In the October 2019 general elections, the party received 4.3% of the vote and won three seats, all in Khama's home area of Central District – Tshekedi Khama II elected in Serowe West, Leepetswe Lesedi in Serowe South and Baratiwa Mathoothe in Serowe North. However, party leader Biggie Butale failed to be elected in Tati West.

On 6 August 2022, the BPF joined the Umbrella for Democratic Change alliance, at that time, uniting all opposition parties in the National Assembly except the Alliance for Progressives. However, during a party retreat on the 6th of April 2024, the party left the alliance, opting for a "pact model" instead of running under the UDC symbol ahead of the 2024 elections.

== Ideology ==
The party focuses on reforms in the fields of healthcare, housing and education. It pledges to build 100,000 affordable houses and proposes a comprehensive health insurance package that would cover all citizens. It supports the mixed-member proportional representation system, and also plans to invest in AI, 5G networks and smart city projects.

The Botswana Patriotic Front also wishes to introduce direct presidential elections, separate from the general elections. The party also proposes to introduce presidential advisory council for social groups such as the youth, women, the disabled and the working class. The party also postulates increasing old-age pensions and reducing the age threshold for the pension from 65 to 60 years. It also pledges to promote self-sufficiency of the Botswana's agriculture and food industry.

Its voter base are primarily the Ngwato regions, where the party appeals to the Ngwato tribal and localist sentiments. Ian Khama campaigns on his position as the paramount chief of the Ngwato tribe, and one of the slogans of the BPF is "Not without my paramount chief". Apart from Ngwato people, the party also encompasses former members and dissidents from the Botswana Democratic Party.

== Election results ==
=== National Assembly ===
Election	Leader	Votes	%	Seats	+/–	Position	Status
2019	Biggie Butale	34,028	4.41%	3 / 57	New	▲3rd	Opposition
2024	Mephato Reatile	68,978	8.26%	5 / 61	▲2	3rd	Government

== Election symbol ==
The Botswana Patriotic Front uses a clock with its arms pointing at 4 o'clock as its logo or election symbol. The clock is accompanied by the words Ke Nako, meaning "it is time" in Setswana.
