= Ian Khama =

Fourth president of Botswana from 2008 to 2018

His Excellency Ian Khama
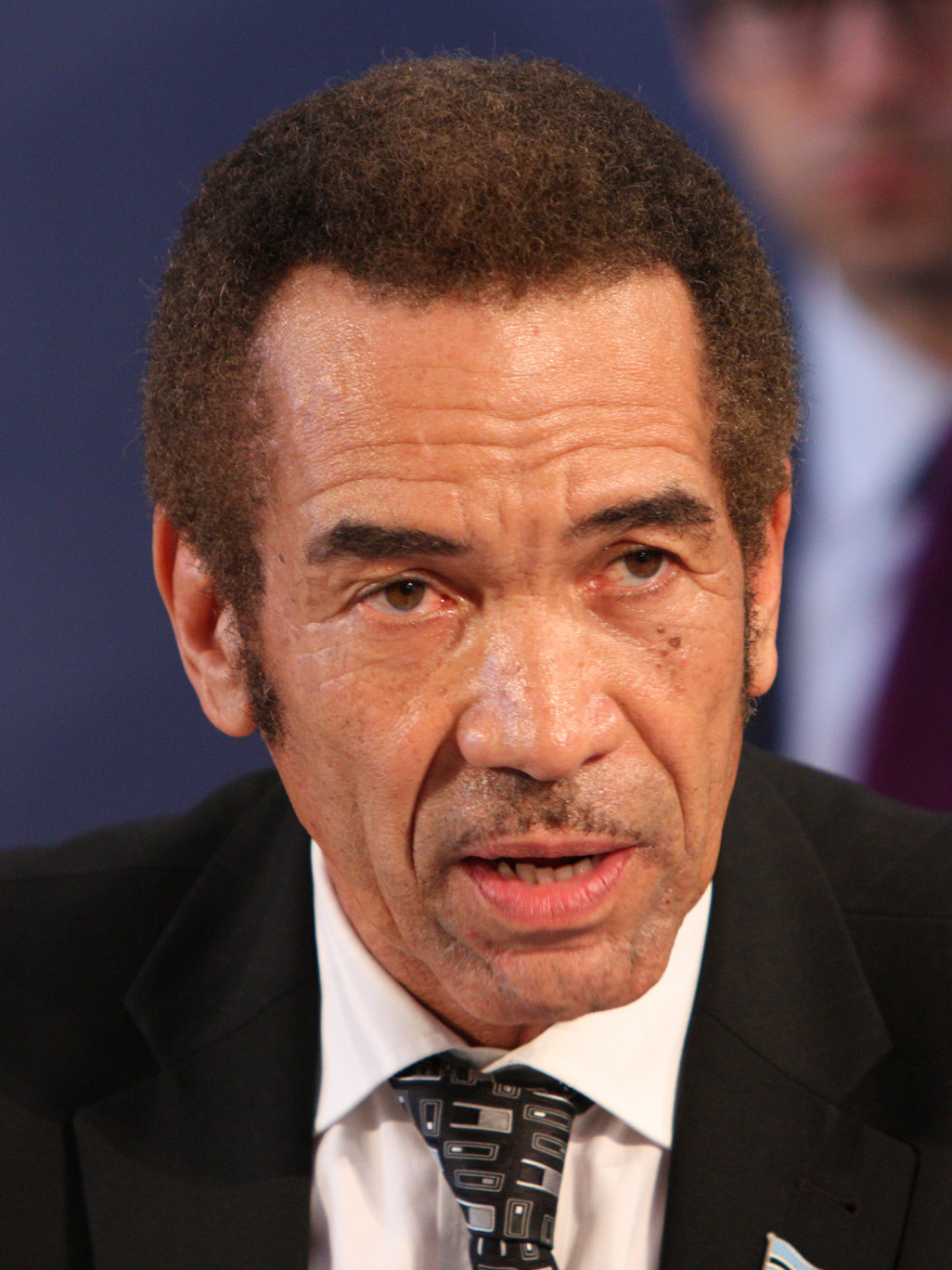
- Khama in 2014

4th President of Botswana
- In office 1 April 2008 – 1 April 2018
- Vice President: Mompati Merafhe (2008–2012); Ponatshego Kedikilwe (2012–2014); Mokgweetsi Masisi (2014–2018)
- Preceded by: Festus Mogae
- Succeeded by: Mokgweetsi Masisi

5th Vice-President of Botswana
- In office 13 July 1998 – 1 April 2008
- President: Festus Mogae
- Preceded by: Festus Mogae
- Succeeded by: Mompati Merafhe

Personal details
- Born: Ian Seretse Khama; 27 February 1953 (age 73) Ewell, Surrey, England
- Party: Botswana Democratic Party (until 2019; 2025–present)
- Other political affiliations: Botswana Patriotic Front (2019–2026)
- Parent(s): Seretse Khama (father); Ruth Williams (mother)
- Relatives: Tshekedi Khama II (brother)
- Education: Royal Military Academy Sandhurst

Military service
- Allegiance: Botswana
- Years of service: 1977–1998
- Rank: Lieutenant General
- Commands: Botswana Defence Force

Seretse Khama Ian Khama (born 27 February 1953) is a Motswana politician and former military officer who served as the fourth President of Botswana from 1 April 2008 to 1 April 2018. After serving as Commander of the Botswana Defence Force, he entered politics and was Vice-President of Botswana from 1998 to 2008, then succeeded Festus Mogae as president on 1 April 2008. He won a full term in the 2009 election and was re-elected in October 2014.

== Early life ==
Ian Khama is the second child of Sir Seretse Khama (1 July 1921 – 13 July 1980), Botswana's foremost independence leader and its president from 1966 to 1980, and Lady Khama. He was born in Chertsey, Surrey, while his father was living in exile in the United Kingdom, due to the opposition by the colonial government and the emergent apartheid regime in South Africa to his marriage to a white woman.

He is also the grandson of Sekgoma II (1869–1925), who was the paramount chief of the Bamangwato people, and the great-grandson of Khama III (1837–1923), their king. His great-great-grandfather of Kgosikgolo Sekgoma I was Chief of the Bamangwato people (1815–1885). The name "Seretse" means "the clay that binds together", and was given to his father to celebrate the recent reconciliation of his father and grandfather; this reconciliation assured Seretse Khama's ascension to the throne when his aged father died in 1925. Ian Seretse Khama is named after his father to continue this historical legacy. He is also known simply as Ian Khama to differentiate between himself and his father. Tshekedi Khama II, Ian Khama's brother, was named after their great uncle, Tshekedi Khama who was the regent and guardian for Seretse Khama, the first president of Botswana.

== Education and military career ==
Ian Khama was educated at Waterford Kamhlaba, a United World College in Mbabane, and at the Royal Military Academy Sandhurst. He is a qualified pilot. In April 1977, Khama was appointed as a brigadier general at age 24 during Sir Seretse Khama's Presidency, making him the Deputy Commander to late former Vice President Lt. Gen. Mompati Merafhe. He later served as the Commander of the Botswana Defence Force (BDF) from his appointment in 1989, retiring from the position in 1998. During this time, Khama received military honours, including the Founder Officer Medal for being part of the Botswana Defence Force when it was created in 1977, the Duty Code Order for devotion to duty, and the Distinguished Service Medal in 1997 after 20 years of service.

== Political career ==
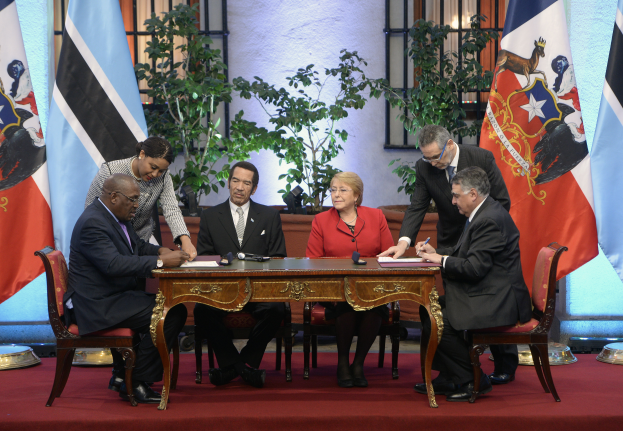
Khama during a state visit to Chile in 2017

Khama, serving as Commander of the Botswana Defence Force, announced on 16 December 1997 that he would retire from his command on 31 March 1998. Because this was the same date as the planned retirement of President Quett Masire, it fueled political speculation about Khama. On 1 April 1998, when Vice-President Festus Mogae succeeded Masire as president, Khama was appointed as the new vice-president. However, Khama did not hold a seat in the National Assembly, and so could not immediately take office as vice-president. In early July 1998 he overwhelmingly won a by-election in Serowe North, receiving 2,986 votes against 86 votes for the candidate of the opposition Botswana National Front. On 13 July, he took his seat in the National Assembly and was sworn in as vice-president. By these actions, he effectively renounced his hitherto unclaimed hereditary chieftaincy, as the constitutional monarchs of modern Botswana are legally barred from actively taking part in party politics. Many traditional Bamangwato continued to recognize him as their chief.

Following the victory of the Botswana Democratic Party (BDP) in the general election of October 1999, Khama remained vice-president as well as Minister of Presidential Affairs and Public Administration. Mogae granted Khama a one-year leave later in the year, a decision that the opposition Botswana Congress Party and the Botswana Council of Non-Governmental Organizations sharply criticized. Khama's leave became effective on 1 January 2000. He returned to his duties as vice-president on 1 September 2000, although he was replaced as Minister of Presidential Affairs and Public Administration at that time.

Khama, already a member of the BDP Central Committee, was elected as Chairman of the BDP on 22 July 2003 at a party congress; he defeated the previous chairman, Ponatshego Kedikilwe, receiving 512 votes against 219 for Kedikilwe. Khama had been backed for the post by President Mogae, paving the way for Khama to eventually succeed Mogae as president.

In 2007, Khama appeared on British television in the BBC's Top Gear motoring programme, meeting the presenters as they prepared to cross the Makgadikgadi Pan in northern Botswana by car for the Top Gear: Botswana Special.

== Presidency ==
=== Interim term, 2008–2009 ===
Mogae stepped down, as he had long said he would do, on 1 April 2008; Khama succeeded him as president. At his swearing-in ceremony in Gaborone, Khama said that there would be continuity in policy and no "radical changes", although he said that "a change in style and special emphasis on a number of issues" might be evident, and he emphasized his commitment to democracy. He immediately undertook a major cabinet reshuffle, and he appointed Mompati Merafhe, who had been Foreign Minister, as the new vice-president. Upon becoming president, Khama left his post as Chairman of the BDP; Daniel Kwelagobe was chosen to replace him. Khama was not elected to the presidency for his first year in office, being appointed due to his position as vice president. Some political commentators such as Kenneth Good see as a flaw in the electoral system in Botswana.

President Khama first articulated his desire to impose a 70% alcohol levy, meant to combat the problem of excessive drinking in Botswana. The practical effect of such a levy was soon seen to have a deleterious effect on the brewing industry, which resisted the imposition of such a levy, along with bars and other drinking establishments. The President later imposed a 30% levy after consulting with industry leaders, including the Botswana Confederation of Commerce, Industry and Manpower. SAB Miller secured British diplomatic representation to attempt to lower the levy.

In 2008, The Media Practitioners Act passed into Botswana law, and has been criticized as inhibiting free speech by several outlets. The act's language seeks to encourage a more professional journalistic standard. The law has proved to be difficult to enforce or implement.

In 2009, Khama appeared on CNN's African Voices which painted a positive picture of Khama, and named Botswana an African "success story".

=== 2009 general election ===
In the 2009 Botswana general election, Khama was elected to the first of two terms as president. Politically, Khama's election campaign was dominated by internal squabbling in the Botswana Democratic Party (BDP), which was clearly divided into two major factions, the A-Team and the Barata Phati factions. The A-Team was led by President Khama, Jacob Nkate, the former minister of education, and the late former vice president Mompati Merafhe. The Barata Phati faction was led by former BDP secretary general Daniel Kwelagobe, formerly the chairman of the party, the late Gomolemo Motswaledi, and also retired former vice president Ponatshego Kedikilwe, who wished to bring about constitutional reform not only to the BDP but also to the country's constitution. In the run-up to the 2009 elections, Motswaledi, who gave up on his ambition to run for a seat in Serowe in order to make way for Ian Khama's brother, Tshekedi Khama II, was also excluded from representing Gaborone when he ran afoul of President Khama. Motswaledi lost a lawsuit against Khama when the High Court ruled that the president enjoyed constitutional immunity from litigation by virtue of his position. After this incident, critics accused Khama of authoritarian tendencies; More than half of the BDP central Committee at one time felt that Khama had on many instances acted beyond his powers. Others, including Khama and his legal representation, said that he was simply instilling discipline as part of his role as the head of the party.

Khama won 53.26% of the vote, and a majority of seats in the National Assembly.

=== First term, 2009–2014 ===
After the 2009 election, Motswaledi bowed out of the BDP to form another political party, the Botswana Movement for Democracy (BMD).

Khama put in place a ban on elephant hunting in 2014.

The death of John Kalifatis, whose death resulted during the course of a robbery investigation, occurred early in Khama's presidency. The police statement on Kalifatis reads: "The deceased, John Kalafatis, had a warrant of arrest issued against him on 12 January 2009 for armed robbery among others. All along, he was a fugitive from justice." The officers involved claimed that they mistakenly believed him to be reaching for his firearm at the time of the shooting. Other sources dispute this, and claim that Kalafatis had been executed by members of the Botswana Defense Force. The three members of the BDF responsible for the death of Kalifatis were found guilty of murder, and each sentenced to 11 years in prison. They received a presidential pardon from Khama in 2012. This was seen as proof by some sources that Khama was involved in the killing. The prosecuting lawyer for Kalifatis said "What is his special interest in these particular offenders, how can we not suspect that he had a personal interest in the case…?"

=== 2014 general election ===
In the 2014 Botswana general election, Khama won his second term. His party received 46.45% of the vote, and a majority of seats in the National Assembly. In the lead up to the election, opposition politician Gomolemo Motswaledi died in a traffic collision on 30 July 2014. While there was some speculation on the incident being politically motivated, the police force concluded that the death was an accident.

=== Second term, 2014–2018 ===
In 2015, Khama was awarded an honorary doctorate in political science from Konkuk University in South Korea. After he received the degree, Khama's official title was "His Excellency the President Lieutenant General Dr Seretse Khama Ian Khama".

== Political opinions ==
Khama took a strong stance against the Zimbabwean government, particularly Robert Mugabe. He did so by refusing to recognize the government unless and until it included members of the Movement for Democratic Change (MDC) headed by Morgan Tsvangirai. Khama also condemned the action of Sudan's President Omar al-Bashir in the region of Darfur and became a vocal critic of despotic governments in Africa along with President Jakaya Kikwete of Tanzania and President Levy Mwanawasa of Zambia.

Khama has been criticized by some figures for making poor decisions, including by former president Quett Masire, who claimed that the BDP had been taken over by opportunists looking to benefit from senior government positions.

Under Khama, the government has also established the Directorate of Intelligence and Security Services (DISS) with police powers, which is seen as the Botswana equivalent of the Federal Bureau of Investigation in the United States. Although this type of organization is not new and is found in many countries, it has critics in Botswana who charge that there are very few domestic or transnational threats that the police and the military could not handle. Some, including executive director of the Open Society Initiative for Southern Africa, Siphosami Malunga, have argued that the institution, initially headed by President Khama's close friend Issac Kgosi, could easily be manipulated and used against political enemies or others who criticize the President or his administration.

On the economic front, Khama has been a vocal proponent of moving Botswana away from its over-reliance on diamonds and diversifying its economy, especially to the agriculture and tourism sector.

Khama put in place a ban on elephant hunting during his time as president, and supported conservation efforts in Botswana. In 2018, he criticized President Donald Trump for encouraging elephant poaching.

A teetotaler, Khama has been strongly prohibitionist in his attitude towards alcohol, viewing it as a significant problem.

Diplomatically, he took a strong stance on North Korea's human rights issues. After cutting ties with North Korea in 2014 over its egregious human rights violations, he described the human rights atrocities in the hermit kingdom 'worse than the African refugee issues', particularly during the mass famine in the 1990s. He gave an interview with the Yonhap News Agency during his visit to Seoul, South Korea in 2015, criticizing the North's leaders for 'living in the Stone Age' and called their aggressive actions unacceptable.

== Retirement ==
On 1 April 2018, Mokgweetsi Masisi was sworn in as the 5th President of Botswana, succeeding Ian Khama and his full ten years of presidency. After several disagreements with Masisi, in particular accusing Masisi of authoritarian tendencies, Khama decided to leave the BDP and join the Botswana Patriotic Front (BPF), a newly formed breakaway from the BDP. He campaigned for the BPF, which won three seats in the 2019 general elections in the Serowe area.

In 2018, after resigning from the presidency, Khama became a member of the Board of Directors of the US-based organization Conservation International, which is also active in Botswana. In 2021, Khama went on a self-imposed exile, during which he claimed that there had been a plot to poison him.

In December 2022 a court in Botswana issued an arrest warrant for Khama for the possession of five illegal firearms after his failure to appear in court. On 13 September 2024, Ian Khama returned to Botswana after three years in exile, to appear in court and request to be released pending trial. On 30 November 2024, he resumed his title as the reigning Kgosikgolo of the BamaNgwato, taking the regnal name Khama IV, amid celebrations at the Serowe Sports Complex attended by national and international dignitaries, ending a century of regency for the BamaNgwato. The incoming government following the 2024 Botswana elections dropped the firearms charges, which Khama had alleged were politically motivated tactics from the former Masisi government.

On 20 January 2025, Khama was sworn in as a member of the Ntlo ya Dikgosi, the advisory body of hereditary chiefs advising Parliament. In September 2025, as part of the party's rapprochement plan with Khama under the leadership of Mpho Balopi, the BDP announced the rescission of Khama's 2019 expulsion from the party, thereby restoring his membership.

== Honours and awards ==
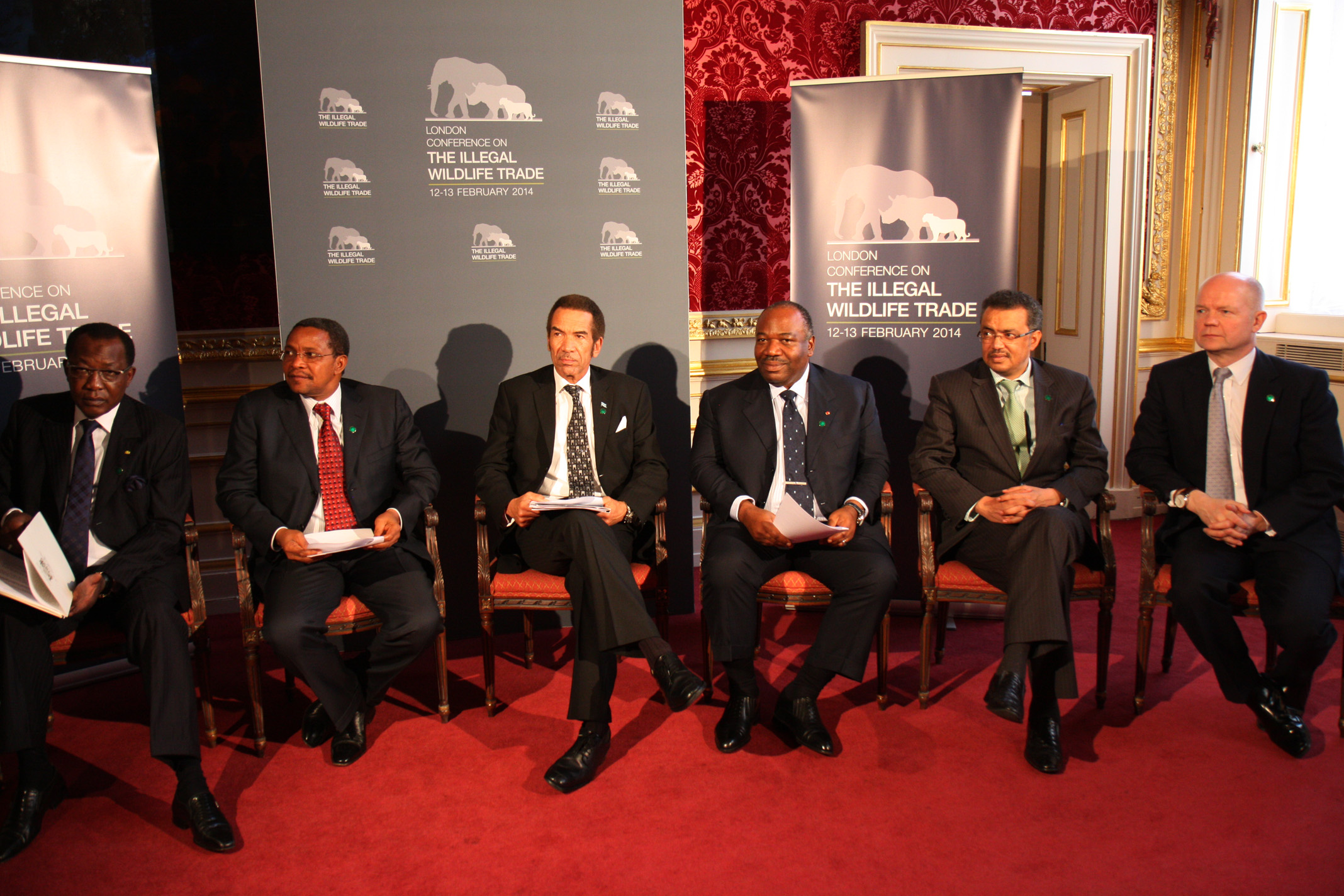
Khama at the London Conference on the Illegal Wildlife Trade in 2014.

=== Honours ===
| Year | Country | Order |
|---|---|---|
| | Botswana | Presidential Order of Honour |
| | Botswana | Founder Officer Medal |
| | Botswana | Duty Code Order |
| | Botswana | Distinguished Service Medal |

== See also ==
- List of heads of the executive by approval rating

Political offices
| Preceded by Festus Mogae | Vice President of Botswana; 1998–2008 | Succeeded by Mompati Merafhe |
| Preceded by Festus Mogae | President of Botswana; 2008–2018 | Succeeded by Mokgweetsi Masisi |
