= Alliance for Progressives =

Political party in Botswana

- Abbreviation: AP
- Leader: Ndaba Gaolathe
- Founded: 28 October 2017
- Split from: Botswana Movement for Democracy
- Ideology: Social liberalism Civic nationalism
- Political position: Centre
- National affiliation: Umbrella for Democratic Change
- Slogan: Tswelelopele Ya Botlhe
- National Assembly: 6 / 61
- Pan African Parliament: 0 / 5

Website
- www.ap.org.bw

The Alliance for Progressives is a social liberal political party in Botswana.

== History ==
In July 2017 the Botswana Movement for Democracy (BMD) president Ndaba Gaolathe and five other members of the party's executive were expelled from the party. As a result, Gaolathe set up a new leadership committee, which was later transformed into a breakaway party, the Alliance for Progressives. The new party was formally established on 28 October 2017 with Gaolathe as leader and Wynter Mmolotsi as deputy president. Six sitting MPs joined the party, although Haskins Nkaigwa later returned to the UDC, leaving it with five seats going into the 2019 general elections.

The elections saw the party receive 5% of the vote, finishing third behind the Botswana Democratic Party and the Umbrella for Democratic Change in terms of popular vote share. However, it only retained a single seat, with Mmolotsi winning in the Francistown South constituency.

The party joined the Umbrella for Democratic Change (UDC) alliance ahead of the 2024 general elections. Although the party only marginally increased its vote share to 6%, it won six seats, with the UDC securing a majority in the National Assembly.

== Election results ==
=== National Assembly ===
Election	Leader	Votes	%	Seats	+/–	Position	Status
2019	Ndaba Gaolathe	39,561	5.12	1 / 57	New	4th	Opposition
2024 (Note: Ran as part of the UDC)	Ndaba Gaolathe	46,799	5.82	6 / 61	▲5	▲3rd	Government
