= 2014 Botswana general election =

- 24 October 2014

57 of the 63 seats in the National Assembly 29 seats needed for a majority
- Registered: 824,073
- Turnout: 84.75% (of registered voters) (▲8.04pp); 55.09% (of eligible population) (▼7.11pp) (Note: National Study On Voter Apathy in Botswana (PDF). University of Botswana. IEC Botswana. 2022. p. 17.)
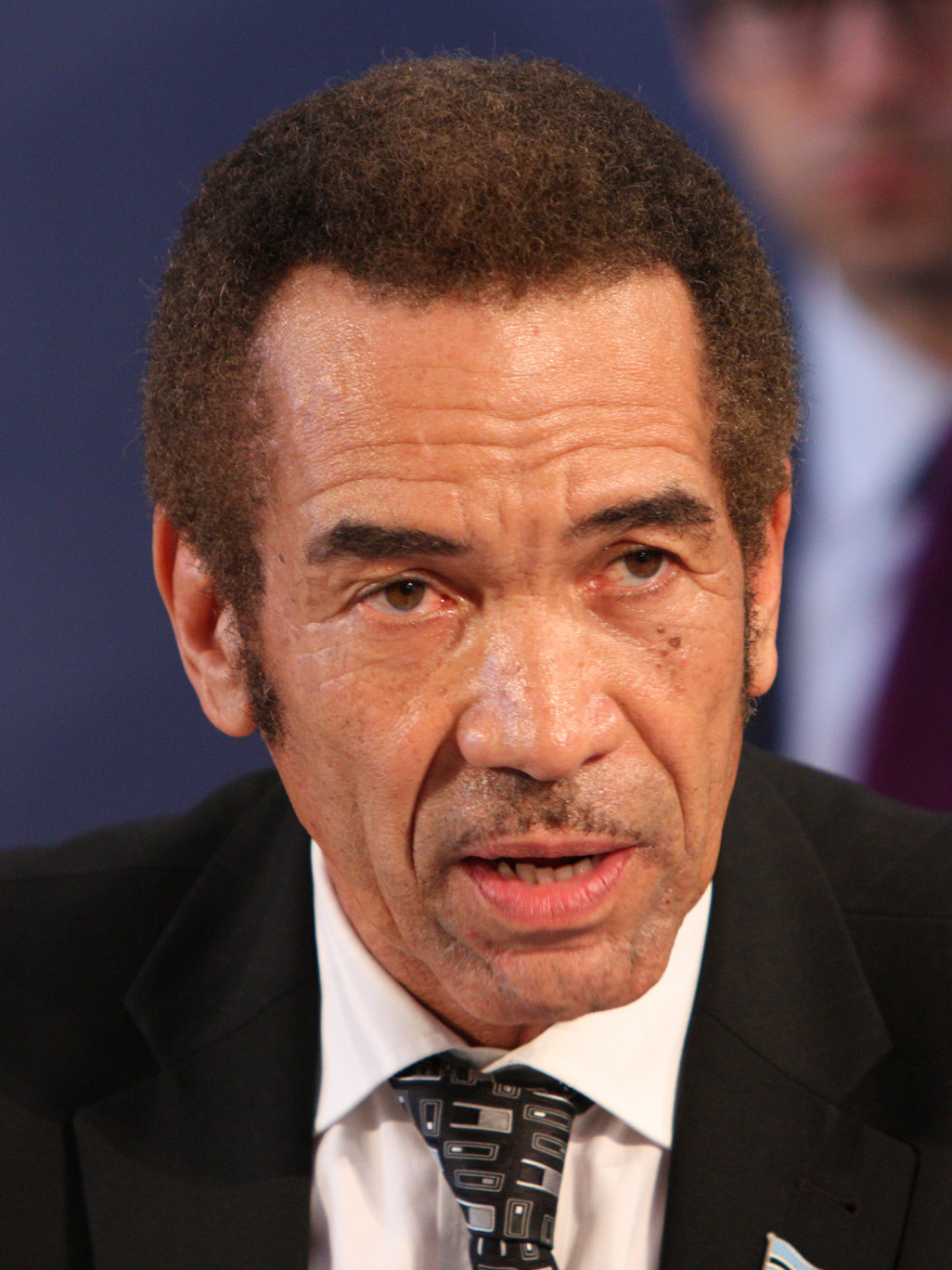

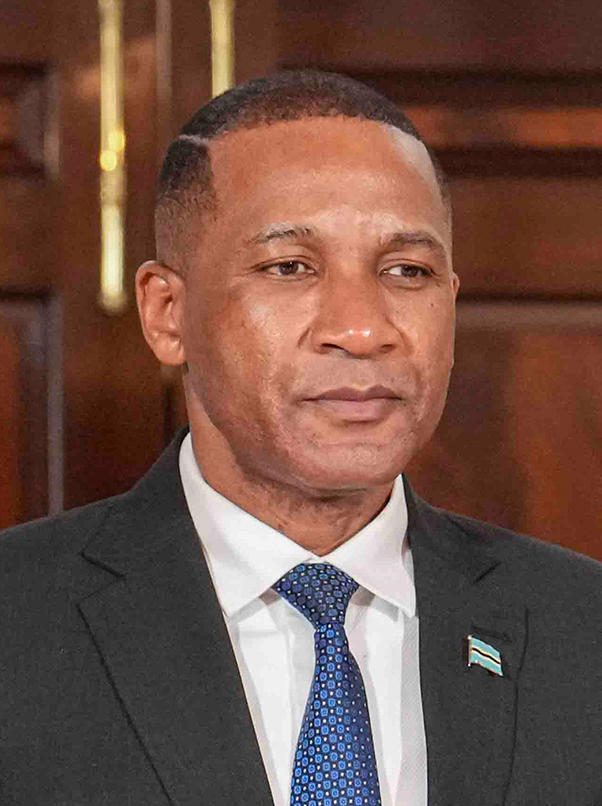

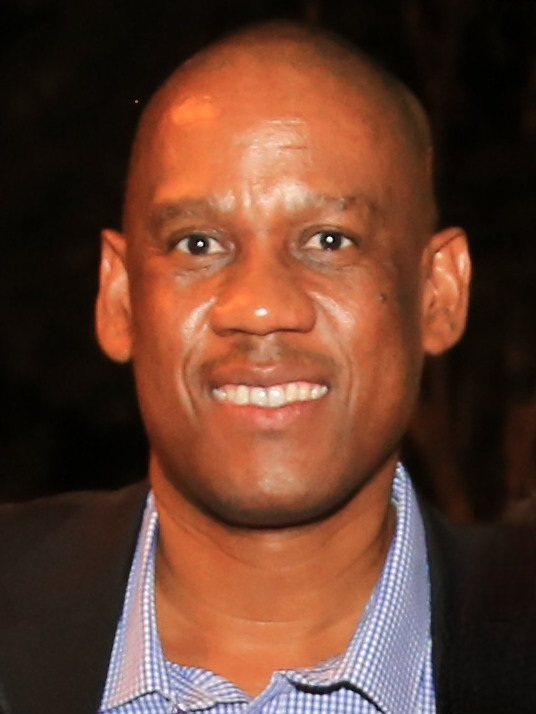
	First party	Second party	Third party
Leader	Ian Khama	Duma Boko	Dumelang Saleshando
Party	BDP	UDC	BCP
Leader's seat	None (Note: Incumbent presidents are ineligible to contest National Assembly seats; instead, they serve as ex-officio members of Parliament.)	Gaborone Bonnington North	Gaborone Central (defeated)
Last election	53.26%, 45 seats	23.33%, 6 seats	19.15%, 4 seats
Seats won	37	17	3
Seat change	▼8	▲11	▼1
Popular vote	320,647	207,113	140,998
Percentage	46.45%	30.01%	20.43%
Swing	▼6.81pp	▲6.68pp	▲1.28pp
President before election
Ian Khama
BDP
Elected President
Ian Khama
BDP

General and local elections were held in Botswana on 24 October 2014. The result was an eleventh straight victory for the Botswana Democratic Party, which won 37 of the 57 elected seats. Incumbent president Ian Khama was sworn in for a second term on 28 October.

The period leading up to the elections was characterized by an unprecedented economic downturn in the country, a direct result of the Great Recession. Additionally, there was a surge in social conflict, including a lengthy public service strike in mid-2011, which was orchestrated by the Botswana Federation of Public Sector Unions (BOFEPUSU). Ian Khama received significant criticism for his handling of these issues, and internal conflicts within the ruling Botswana Democratic Party (BDP) deepened. As a result, a more liberal faction of the party, opposed to Khama's leadership, splintered from the BDP and established the Botswana Movement for Democracy (BMD) under the leadership of Gomolemo Motswaledi.

== Background ==
The 2009 election witnessed the Botswana Democratic Party's landslide victory, securing 45 out of 57 seats and guaranteeing the election of President Ian Khama for a full term. This victory came despite an opposition divided between the Botswana National Front (BNF) and the Botswana Congress Party (BCP), with the added challenge of the BNF grappling with internal conflicts. In response to this electoral setback, the opposition parties underwent significant internal reorganization. BNF leader Otsweletse Moupo retired in July 2010, and Duma Boko succeeded him. Gilson Saleshando stepped down from BCP leadership, making way for his son, Dumelang Saleshando, who served as the MP for Gaborone Central.

However, despite Khama's consolidated leadership, 2010 saw a deepening of internal divisions, culminating in a significant faction of the party led by Gomolemo Motswaledi breaking away to establish the liberal Botswana Movement for Democracy (BMD). This marked the first major split in the BDP in over fifty years. The defection of Members of Parliament from the BDP to the BMD allowed Botsalo Ntuane to assume the position of Leader of the Opposition in the National Assembly, breaking the forty-year tradition of BNF leaders holding that position.

Khama's first term faced considerable financial challenges. The global Great Recession, starting in 2009, had a profound impact on the Botswana economy. Despite maintaining relative stability compared to the region, Botswana's social situation rapidly deteriorated, reaching its peak in 2011. The country's strong public sector, heavily reliant on diamond exports, suffered from reduced demand for diamonds. Inflation, which had been at 7% per year for many years, surged to 12.6% in 2009. In response, the Khama administration implemented harsh austerity policies supported by the World Bank and the International Monetary Fund (IMF). These policies involved freezing wage increases and reducing the number of public employees, inevitably leading to rising unemployment. Botswana experienced three consecutive years without pay increases in the public service, despite a doubling of inflation in 2009, severely affecting the purchasing power of many workers. These developments weakened the popularity of the BDP and reactivated previously overlooked civil society actors, such as the labour movement.

In early April 2011, in response to the government's refusal to guarantee wage increases, the Botswana Federation of Public Sector Unions (BOFEPUSU), representing nearly 100,000 public employees, initiated the longest public service strike in the country's history, lasting for more than two months until the end of June. BOFEPUSU's main demands included a 16% wage increase, despite the Khama government's insistence that this was unfeasible. The strike also encompassed political grievances, calling for opposition parties to cooperate electorally against the Khama government and the repeal of articles of Botswana's Public Service Act that prohibited workers' political participation. In response, the government conducted mass layoffs of essential workers, which allowed it to outsource and comply with IMF demands to reduce the public sector. Although the strike failed to secure a wage increase, it significantly raised political awareness among large sections of the Botswana population. Labour issues in the context of the precarious economic situation became a focal point of debate in the 2014 election campaign.

Opposition politicians capitalized on the opportunity, using BOFEPUSU demonstrations as platforms to criticize the Khama government. Trade unionists and opposition figures began demanding a change in leadership, greatly unsettling the government. BOFEPUSU played a pivotal role in convincing opposition parties to seek electoral unity after decades of deep divisions. While some union leaders had ties to the BCP, many of their complaints called for broader opposition cooperation. In November 2012, the BNF, the BMD, and the BPP agreed to form the Umbrella for Democratic Change (UDC), marking the first formally registered coalition between major opposition parties since independence. The UDC registered as a political party to contest the elections under a single banner.

In 2012, the BMD entered into an agreement with the main opposition party, the BNF and the Botswana People's Party to establish the UDC alliance. The alliance participated in the elections by allocating seats among its partners and nominating Duma Boko, the Chairman of BNF, as its unified presidential candidate. Despite BOFEPUSU's efforts, negotiations between the BCP and the UDC for total opposition party unification stalled. Eventually, the BCP, which had become the third largest political party in the country after absorbing two minor parties, the Botswana Alliance Movement and the MELS Movement of Botswana, decided to contest the elections separately. While the opposition remained split, it grew considerably stronger, representing the first substantial challenge to the BDP's uninterrupted rule since Botswana's independence in 1966.

== Electoral system ==
At the time of the elections the 63 members of the National Assembly were divided between 57 MPs elected in single-member constituencies by first-past-the-post, four members appointed by the governing party, and two ex-officio members (the President and the Speaker).

Voters had to be Botswana citizens at least 18 years old who had been resident in the country for at least 12 months prior to voter registration. People declared insane, holding dual citizenship, under a death sentence, convicted of an electoral offence or imprisoned for at least six months were not allowed to vote. Candidates had to be Botswana citizens at least 21 years old, without an undischarged bankruptcy, and had to be able to speak and read English sufficiently well to take part in parliamentary proceedings.

While there were variations in the names and borders of the constituencies, their number remained constant. This marked the first time, since Botswana's independence, that three consecutive elections were held with the same number of constituencies.

== Campaign ==
The campaign was marred by the death of Motswaledi in a car accident on 30 July 2014. Although there was some speculation about the incident being politically motivated, the police force concluded that the death was an accident. The opposition accused the Khama government of becoming increasingly authoritarian and successfully attracted a diverse group of young voters who disapproved of the government's economic management. Mindful of the growing discontent, Khama responded with a platform promising change, while highlighting the country's relatively strong economic performance compared to other nations around the world during the global recession.

Aware that it faced an unprecedented challenge, the Botswana Democratic Party conducted an intensive campaign aimed at appealing to rational voters. They acknowledged the problems affecting a significant portion of the population but attributed these difficulties to the global economic situation, committing to change course. Their manifesto, released in April 2014, defended the party's track record in government, highlighting that Botswana had been one of the world's poorest countries before independence but had since improved comparatively to other states in the region. It also emphasized recent government achievements in technology and housing programs. Furthermore, they promised to launch a new project, the Integrated Support Program for Arable Development (ISPAAD), designed to support subsistence farmers and ensure food security in the country. ISPAAD faced criticism from opponents due to its perceived high cost and populist nature.

The manifesto intentionally remained vague on labour issues, likely to avoid worsening the strained relationship with labour unions, simply stating that the party would "continue to foster harmonious relations between all stakeholders in the labour market." In response, BOFEPUSU aggressively criticized the manifesto, accusing Khama of presenting an overly optimistic picture and labeling the ruling party's claim of establishing harmonious labour relations as "a blatant lie." The BDP also faced criticism for its focus on educational matters, as it only pledged to allocate more funds to education, despite growing concerns about the precarious state of the country's education system. The BDP intensified its criticism of opposition parties and promoted the symbolism of showing a "red card" (referring to both the football penalty and the ruling party's colours) so as to "remove the opposition from the game."

The Umbrella for Democratic Change released a 38-page manifesto in which they strongly questioned the Khama government, accusing it of becoming increasingly authoritarian and economically irrational. As an alternative, the UDC proposed an extensive program of social, political, and economic reforms. Institutionally, they proposed establishing a stronger parliamentary system by separating the roles of the head of state and the head of government, reinstating the position of prime minister that had been abolished after independence. They also pledged to enhance the powers of local councils and move toward a more decentralized democracy. In terms of labour relations, the coalition strongly criticized the situation under the Khama government and promised to maintain cordial relations with labour unions and listen to their demands if they came to power. Regarding education, the UDC proposed improving teachers' working conditions, upgrading educational infrastructure, making preschool education compulsory, and ensuring youth access to tertiary education. Despite attempting to gain support by emphasizing the labour movement's discourse and the 2011 strike's spirit, the UDC manifesto focused more on criticizing the institutional situation under the BDP government than on workers' rights. They did address housing issues, promising audits through a public-private partnership and purchasing land from urban and other landowners to address land shortages.

Considered one of the most stable parties in the country and strengthened after absorbing BAM and MELS, the Botswana Congress Party competed with a progressive platform focused on workers' rights, strengthening infrastructure, and improving conditions in health and education, which they considered "in a state of crisis." Their manifesto, titled "Ready to Lead—Leading Botswana off the Crossroads," contained numerous promises in various fields. Many of their political promises, especially those related to electoral and institutional reforms and decentralization, resembled those of the UDC, with differences primarily in format, particularly concerning housing. The party proposed modifying the electoral system from single-member majority vote to a mixed system that maintained single-member constituencies while adding seats elected through proportional representation lists to ensure a more balanced representation of political forces. They also proposed sweeping constitutional reforms that would prevent Parliament from passing any legislation restricting freedom of the press and strengthen the Leader of the Opposition's position. While promises related to women's rights were common in electoral campaigns, the BCP formally committed to promoting affirmative action in this regard.

The campaign featured the emergence of unions and private platforms for information dissemination, ensuring a more balanced media coverage after decades of uneven communication favoring the BDP. BOFEPUSU, in collaboration with the United States embassy in Gaborone, sponsored debates between parliamentary candidates through the private radio station Gabz FM. The BDP rejected these proposals and boycotted the debates, which were attended by the UDC and the BCP. Although this decision appeared aimed at fostering division among opposition parties and preserving the government's image, some elements within the BDP's own ranks questioned the ruling party's absence in the debates. The privately owned newspaper Mmegi prominently displayed a daily countdown to the elections on its front page, featuring photos of the three presidential candidates (Khama, Boko, and Saleshando). Next to these images was a ballot box with six critical issues for voters: unemployment, land, services, corruption, education, and civil liberties.

With the opposition divided into two equally strong blocs, gaining the support of BOFEPUSU, given its strong influence on the labour movement and its role in challenging the Khama government, was considered crucial. Both the UDC and the BCP actively sought official union endorsement. In response to government actions, BOFEPUSU published a "blacklist" of politicians, mostly from the BDP, who they believed were working against workers' interests. Meanwhile, the country's largest Manual Workers Union released a comprehensive document titled "Two Years to Vision 2016, But Too Far Away!: A Quick Guide to Disturbing Developments in Botswana Governance." This document criticized the unfulfilled "Vision 2016" announced by the BDP years earlier and aimed to influence voters against the BDP. Despite numerous union leaders supporting the BCP, in late July, Johnson Motswarakgole, secretary of BOFEPUSU, confirmed his support for the UDC, asserting that it had the best chance of winning among the opposition parties. In response, the BCP leadership criticized pro-UDC trade unionists harshly, expressing their surprise at this decision, as BOFEPUSU had previously promised not to publicly support any opposition party, denouncing it as "abuse" by Motswarakgole. Nevertheless, the BCP reaffirmed its commitment to workers' rights and its willingness to collaborate with BOFEPUSU if the party were to win government.

=== Television debates ===
2014 Botswana general election debate
Date	Broadcaster	Participants — Name Participant N Did not participate		
Date	Broadcaster	BDP	UDC	BCP
20 Oct	eBotswana/Gabz-FM	N	Boko	Saleshando

== Candidatures ==
=== Presidential ===
In accordance with Section 7 of the Supplementary Provisions of the Presidential Election Law, the Secretary of the Independent Election Commission appointed authenticating officers tasked with verifying the authenticity of documents submitted by presidential aspirants. These officers comprised District Commissioners, District Officers, and Senior Police Officers. Acting as the scrutinizing officer for the presidential elections, the Chief Justice of the High Court received the nomination papers of the candidates on 20 September 2014, during two time slots: from 10:00 to 13:00 and from 14:30 to 17:00. The venue for this process was the High Court of Lobatse. At the conclusion of this procedure, three political party leaders were duly declared as validly nominated candidates for the office of President, as shown below.

Name	Party
Dumelang Saleshando	Botswana Congress Party (BCP)
Ian Khama	Botswana Democratic Party (BDP)
Duma Boko	Umbrella for Democratic Change (UDC)
Source: Independent Electoral Commission

=== Parliamentary ===
On the same note, the day designated for the nomination of candidates for the National Assembly elections coincided with the nominations for the local government elections, falling on 25 September. Reflecting a trend seen since the country's independence, the Botswana Democratic Party remained the sole political entity to field candidates in all 57 constituencies.

The Umbrella for Democratic Change presented a total of 52 candidates, strategically distributed among its three member parties: the Botswana National Front secured 27 seats, the Botswana Movement for Democracy secured 20 seats, and the Botswana People's Party secured 10 seats.

The Botswana Congress Party (BCP) emerged as the second-largest political party in terms of the number of parliamentary applicants, fielding 54 candidates. Concurrently, there was an unprecedented surge in the number of independent candidates, with a total of 29 individuals vying for election. Altogether, a grand total of 192 candidates contested the elections. Notably, with only two parties and one alliance involved, this election witnessed the fewest political forces in contention since the nation's independence.

Party	Contested seats	%
Botswana Democratic Party (BDP)	57 / 57	100%
Botswana Congress Party (BCP)	54 / 57	94.7%
Umbrella for Democratic Change (UDC)	52 / 57	91.2%
Independents	29 / 57	50.9%
Source: Independent Electoral Commission

== Results ==
Voting took place as scheduled on 24 October from 06:30 to 19:00. Nearly 700,000 people voted, representing 84.75% of the registered voters, an unprecedented turnout in the country's electoral history. On 25 October the Independent Electoral Commission announced that the Botswana Democratic Party (BDP) had won 33 seats. While the vote count wasn't finalized, preliminary results confirmed the BDP's retention of government, albeit with a considerably smaller margin than in previous elections. The next day, Chief Justice Maruping Dibotelo issued a statement confirming the BDP's victory.

The electoral commission later reported that the BDP had secured a total of 37 seats, with the UDC winning 17 and the BCP three. Four other seats were filled by candidates selected by Parliament, with the President and the Speaker taking the last two seats. Preliminary results indicated that the two opposition parties had made significant gains in urban areas, attracting younger voters dissatisfied with Khama's economic policies, while the BDP maintained strong support in rural areas.

Ultimately, the BDP prevailed with 46.45% of the popular vote and 37 of the 57 seats, marking its worst result in history and falling short of a majority of the popular vote. This was also the first time the BDP failed to secure two-thirds of the elected seats. The BDP's decline was especially pronounced in the capital, Gaborone, where it ranked third in the popular vote behind the UDC and BCP, with the UDC controlling over two-thirds of the city council. Notably, Gaborone Central saw the BDP's lowest result, with just 27.62% of the vote. In total, seven constituencies saw the party fail to exceed a third of the valid votes, all in urban areas. However, the BDP managed to retain the capital seat of Gaborone South, albeit with only 34.28% of the vote, its lowest victory percentage of the day. The BDP also suffered losses in Molepolole, Selebi-Phikwe and Lobatse. Despite this, the ruling party benefited from the division between the UDC and BCP to retain several seats with extremely narrow margins. The BDP's stronghold remained in the East, as seen in its best results in Serowe North with 85.40%, and Serowe West, where the president's brother, Tshekedi Khama, secured 78.57%. In contrast to previous elections, the party only achieved more than two-thirds of the vote in four constituencies compared to the ten it won in 2009. Nevertheless, the BDP managed to regain support in rural areas and reclaimed four constituencies in the far north and south of the country, which had previously been held by prominent figures from the BNF and BCP, two of them with an absolute majority of votes.

Benefiting from greater resources and support across various regions, the UDC secured second place with 30.01% of the popular vote and 17 seats, an unprecedented achievement for any political force outside the BDP in Botswana. The UDC excelled in Gaborone, where it won four out of five constituencies. Duma Boko, leader of the BNF and coalition presidential candidate, was elected in Gaborone Bonnington North with 53.79% of the vote, becoming the first formal leader of a main opposition party to reach the position of Leader of the Opposition through electoral means since 1999. The UDC's best result was in Molepolole North, with 59.16% of the vote, the highest for any opposition candidate that day. However, the UDC was hindered by vote splitting with the BCP, and its popular vote performance was below that of the BNF in the 1994 elections, the last election before the BCP split from the BNF. The virtual dissolution of the BNF upon joining the UDC weakened its support in rural areas, leading to losses in constituencies in the far south of the country previously won in the last two elections. The UDC also faced challenges in the north, where BCP support was concentrated, resulting in four constituencies where its candidates failed to reach 5% of the votes, with its worst performance in Okavango at 1.71%.

The BCP, the third-largest national party, capitalized on the BDP's losses in the North and achieved its highest-ever popular vote share at 20.43%. However, it was hampered by national polarization between the BDP and UDC, securing only three parliamentary seats. The party managed to win the Ramotswa constituency, historically a stronghold of the BNF, but lost three constituencies it held in the previous legislature, including Chobe and Ngami (which it had won in alliance with the Botswana Alliance Movement). Its most significant setback was the loss of its leader and presidential candidate, Dumelang Saleshando, who failed to be re-elected in Gaborone Central, despite placing second behind the UDC. This defeat was largely attributed to opposition voters penalizing Saleshando's leadership for refusing to unify with the UDC and the UDC gaining sympathy votes after the previous UDC candidate for the seat, Gomolemo Motswaledi, died three months prior. The party's weakest result was in the southern Kgalagadi North constituency, with 1.92% of the vote, and its best in the northern Okavango, with 54.68%. The division among the opposition, a recurring theme since independence, favored the BDP, ultimately playing a crucial role in the government's retention. The combined votes of the UDC and BCP would have secured victory in 33 constituencies to the BDP's 24, obtaining 50.43% of the national vote and winning the election.

Party or alliance		Votes	%	Seats	+/–
Botswana Democratic Party		320,647	46.45	37	–8
Umbrella for Democratic; Change	Botswana National Front	114,741	16.62	8	+2
Umbrella for Democratic; Change	Botswana Movement for Democracy	73,697	10.68	9	New
Umbrella for Democratic; Change	Botswana People's Party	18,675	2.71	0	0
Umbrella for Democratic; Change	Total	207,113	30.01	17	+11
Botswana Congress Party		140,998	20.43	3	–1
Independents		21,484	3.11	0	0
Appointed and ex officio members				6	0
Total		690,242	100.00	63	0
Valid votes		690,242	98.83		
Invalid/blank votes		8,167	1.17		
Total votes		698,409	100.00		
Registered voters/turnout		824,073	84.75		
Source: IEC

Popular vote
BDP	46.45%
UDC	30.01%
BCP	20.43%
Independents	3.11%

Parliament seats
BDP	64.91%
UDC	29.82%
BCP	5.26%

=== Results by district and city ===
Proportion of seats and votes won in each district and city, by party (2014)
District	BDP	UDC	BCP
Central	17 / 17	0 / 17	0 / 17
Central	57.6% 109,488	13.5% 25,629	22.5% 42,824
Kweneng	4 / 8	4 / 8	0 / 8
Kweneng	43.3% 46,752	41.8% 45,093	11.3% 12,201
Southern	3 / 6	3 / 6	0 / 6
Southern	45.9% 40,000	41.8% 36,452	11.7% 10,203
Gaborone	1 / 5	4 / 5	0 / 5
Gaborone	30.8% 18,991	45.9% 28,308	20.9% 12,907
Ngamiland	2 / 4	1 / 4	1 / 4
Ngamiland	42.8% 23,917	18.5% 10,350	38.6% 21,540
Francistown	2 / 3	1 / 3	0 / 3
Francistown	43.7% 12,412	25.6% 7,278	30.1% 8,545
Kgatleng	0 / 2	2 / 2	0 / 2
Kgatleng	33.5% 12,026	43.6% 15,680	22.5% 8,086
South-East	1 / 3	1 / 3	1 / 3
South-East	40.0% 16,041	34.3% 13,850	22.4% 9,036
Kgalagadi	2 / 2	0 / 2	0 / 2
Kgalagadi	53.0% 11,472	43.5% 9,416	2.9% 633
North-East	2 / 2	0 / 2	0 / 2
North-East	51.3% 10,374	24.8% 5,018	19.8% 3,995
Selebi-Phikwe	1 / 2	0 / 2	1 / 2
Selebi-Phikwe	38.7% 6,563	12.9% 2,194	43.5% 7,381
Ghanzi	1 / 2	1 / 2	0 / 2
Ghanzi	50.5% 8,497	46.6% 7,845	2.9% 481
Chobe	1 / 1	0 / 1	0 / 1
Chobe	56.5% 4,144	0% 0	43.5% 3,166
Total	37 / 57	17 / 57	3 / 57
Total	46.5% 320,647	30.0% 207,113	20.4% 140,998

== Aftermath ==
The elections marked a severe setback for the BDP, resulting in what was then its worst historical performance. Although it managed to retain power with 46% of the votes and secured 37 out of 57 seats, ensuring Khama's re-election for his second and final term, it was the first time since its inception that the party failed to obtain more than 50% of the popular vote and fell short of securing a two-thirds majority of elected seats.

Simultaneously, in local elections, the BDP's losses deepened as the opposition gained control over eight of the fifteen municipal and district councils. On the other hand, the UDC achieved a strong outcome with 30% of the votes and 17 seats, marking the highest number of seats ever secured by an opposition party. Boko was elected to parliament for Gaborone Bonnington South, enabling him to assume the position of Leader of the Opposition.

The BCP also made history by securing 20% of the vote and three seats, its highest popular vote share to date. However, Saleshando was defeated by the UDC in the Gaborone Central constituency. The election featured a substantial number of independent candidates, although none were elected. Collectively, they garnered 3% of the vote, the most significant support for non-partisan candidates since independence. Voter registration and turnout reached record levels in Botswana's electoral history, with 85% of registered voters participating in the polls.

The fragmentation of opposition votes and the malapportionment of constituencies played a pivotal role in securing Khama's re-election. A hypothetical alliance between the UDC and the BCP would have won 33 constituencies, more than enough to win the election. Khama was inaugurated for his second term on 28 October 2014. In response to the election results, he initiated a cabinet reshuffle, and Education Minister Mokgweetsi Masisi assumed the position of vice-president and therefore, successor-designate, preparing to take over after Khama's term ended in April 2018.

== See also ==
- 11th Parliament of Botswana
