= Umbrella for Democratic Change =

Alliance of political parties in Botswana

- Abbreviation: UDC
- President: Duma Boko
- Vice-President: Ndaba Gaolathe
- Founder: Duma Boko
- Founded: November 2012
- Headquarters: Gaborone
- Ideology: Social democracy; Populism; Factions: Christian left; Social liberalism; Democratic socialism; Pan-Africanism
- Political position: Centre-left to left-wing
- Colours: Navy blue Orange (in 2014)
- Slogan: Decent Jobs; Decent Lives
- Coalition Partners: AP; BNF; BPP
- National Assembly: 36 / 61
- Councillors: 300 / 609
- Pan-African Parliament: 2 / 5

The Umbrella for Democratic Change (UDC) is a centre-left to left-wing alliance of political parties in Botswana. Since the 2024 Botswana general election, the UDC has been the governing alliance of political parties.

The UDC has campaigned on a progressive platform, advocating for a welfare state, wealth redistribution, renewable energy and democratic reforms, particularly in the electoral and judicial spheres.

Since its founding, the UDC's core voter base has varied in composition with shifts in the voting behavior of anti-BDP voters. However, the coalition has generally maintained strong support among the urban population—especially in the Gaborone metropolitan area—as well as among youth and the educated middle class. In the 2019 election, through its alliance with Ian Khama, heir to the BaNgwato throne, the UDC gained substantial support from voters in the Central District, a stronghold of the tribe. Much of this support was retained in the 2024 election.

== History ==
The UDC was founded in November 2012 by members from various opposition parties, including the BPP and BMD. They rallied together in the run-up to the 2014 elections by the Botswana National Front (BNF), the Botswana Movement for Democracy and the Botswana People's Party with the aim of uniting the opposition in the 2014 elections. In February 2017, the Botswana Congress Party, which contested the 2014 elections independently, joined the coalition. The coalition is currently led by Duma Boko from the BNF and plans to contest the 2019 general election jointly, standing a single opposition candidate in each constituency against the ruling Botswana Democratic Party.

The organisation of the opposition parties presented an unprecedented challenge to the longtime-ruling BDP, but the BDP was victorious in elections held on 24 October 2014. Their vote share, which garnered 37 seats, allowed them to maintain a majority in the National Assembly, although it won fewer seats than it had in previous elections.

The UDC won 17 seats and the Botswana Congress Party won three seats. Ian Khama was easily reelected by the legislative body to another term as president.

In October 2018, the BMD was expelled from the coalition after it refused to forgo contesting constituencies that had originally been allocated to it.

After the 2019 Botswana general election, Duma Boko charged there were "massive electoral discrepancies" and said he wanted to challenge the election in court. Official results show the BDP winning 38 of 57 constituencies.

At the 2024 election, held on 30 October 2024, the UDC emerged as the majority party.

== Members ==
| Party | Abbr. | Ideology | Seats in the National Assembly |
|---|---|---|---|
| Botswana National Front | BNF | Social democracy Christian left | 23 / 61 |
| Alliance for Progressives | AP | Social liberalism | 6 / 61 |
| Botswana People's Party | BPP | Democratic socialism Pan-Africanism | 3 / 61 |
| Independents | Ind. | N/A | 4 / 61 |

== Election results ==
=== National Assembly elections ===
| Election | Party leader | Votes | % | Seats | +/– | Position | Result |
|---|---|---|---|---|---|---|---|
| 2014 | Duma Boko | 207,113 | 30.01% | 17 / 57 | ▲11 | 2nd | Opposition |
| 2019 | Duma Boko | 277,071 | 35.88% | 15 / 57 | ▼3 (Note: During the 2014–19 parliamentary term, the Botswana Movement for Democracy (2 seats) left the UDC, whilst the Botswana Congress Party (3 seats) joined the UDC, resulting in the UDC holding 18 seats)) | 2nd | Opposition |
| 2024 | Duma Boko | 310,869 | 37.21% | 36 / 61 | ▲28 | ▲1st | Government |

== See also ==
- Duma Boko
- Elliot Moshoke
