= National Assembly of Botswana =

Unicameral legislature of Botswana

Coordinates: 24°39′31″S 25°54′38″E

The National Assembly of Botswana Palamente ya Botswana
- 13th Parliament

Type
- Type: Unicameral legislature of the Parliament of Botswana
- Term limits: None

History
- Founded: 1966

Leadership
- Speaker: Dithapelo Keorapetse since 7 November 2024
- Deputy Speaker: Helen Manyeneng, UDC since 7 November 2024
- President of Botswana: Duma Boko since 1 November 2024
- Leader of the House: Moeti Mohwasa, UDC since 19 November 2024
- Government Whip: Sam Digwa, UDC since 19 November 2024
- Leader of the Opposition: Dumelang Saleshando, BCP since 1 November 2024
- Opposition whip: Caterpillar Hikuama, BCP since 11 November 2024

Structure
- Seats: 69
- Political groups: Government (49): Umbrella for Democratic Change (36) (Note: Botswana National Front (23); Alliance for Progressives (6); Botswana People's Party (3); Independents (4)); Botswana Patriotic Front (5); Specially-elected (6); Independent (1); President (ex-officio) (1); Official opposition (15): Botswana Congress Party (15); Minority opposition (4): Botswana Democratic Party (4); Presiding officer (1): Speaker (ex-officio) (1)
- Length of term: 5 years

Elections
- Voting system: First-past-the-post
- First election: 1 March 1965
- Last election: 30 October 2024
- Next election: By October 2029

Meeting place
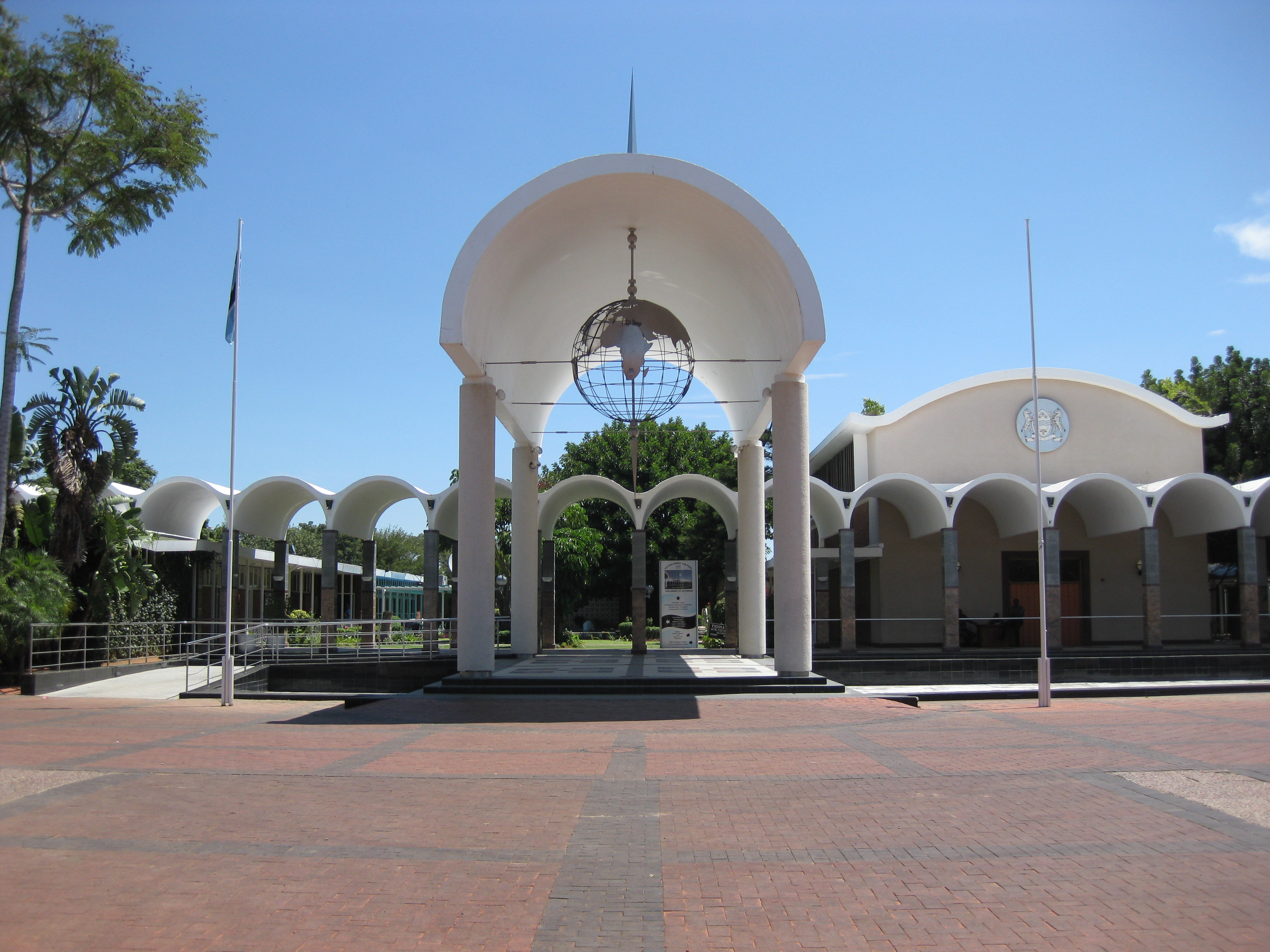
- National Assembly Chamber; Gaborone; South-East District

Website
- www.parliament.gov.bw

The National Assembly is the sole legislative body of Botswana's unicameral Parliament, of which consists of the President and the National Assembly. The Assembly passes laws, provides ministers to form Cabinet, and supervises the work of government. It is also responsible for adopting the country's budgets. It is advised by the Ntlo ya Dikgosi, a council of tribal chiefs which is not a house of Parliament.

Though there were legislative predecessors to the National Assembly during colonial rule, it was not until independence in 1966 that the National Assembly of Botswana officially formed. Since then, there have been consistent multi-party elections and 5 peaceful presidential transitions.

Currently, there are 65 total members of the National Assembly. Voters in single member constituencies directly elect 57 of these members for a term of 5 years through a plurality (or first-past-the-post) system. Six members, meanwhile, are nominated by the President and elected by the assembly. Finally, the remaining two (the President and Speaker of the National Assembly) are ex officio.

Despite the presence of consistent elections, the National Assembly has not escaped criticism. In every election since the founding elections in 1965 until 2024, the Botswana Democratic Party won a majority of seats in the legislative body. Additionally, political science scholars have sometimes expressed concern about the National Assembly because of its few women MPs and its interconnectedness with the executive.

== Role and structure ==
The National Assembly of Botswana is part of the legislative branch of Botswana's National Government and thus has the primary role of debating and passing bills. Always constituting the National Assembly are 57 members elected by voters from single-member constituencies. Along with these elected members are also six members nominated by the President and specially elected to their positions by the National Assembly. Finally, there are also up to two ex-officio members - one of which is always the President. Originally, the purpose of the specially elected members was to create representation in the National Assembly for minority groups of the country. Later, the MPs would typically reserve these spots for people with sought-after skills. More recently, however, the specially elected seats have primarily served as a way for the majority party to increase its number of seats in the assembly.

Among the members of the National Assembly are also a Speaker, a Deputy Speaker, and a Leader of the Opposition. Though the Speaker is often a member of the National Assembly, the MPs do not have to fill this role with another MP. As a result, when the MPs elect a speaker from outside the governing body, the Speaker becomes the 65th member of the National Assembly. If desired, two-thirds of the members can vote to remove the Speaker. Furthermore, along with being members of the National Assembly, some MPs are also part of the President's Cabinet. At any given moment, there are 26 Cabinet ministers in the National Assembly - 8 of whom are assistant ministers. In other words, 42% of the National Assembly is also part of the President's Cabinet.

In general, the main purpose of the National Assembly is to debate and pass bills. Typically, the President introduces bills and members of the Cabinet have the ability to examine them first. Despite this, however, there are a few bills that successfully enter the National Assembly through different pathways. Then, after reaching the National Assembly, a bill must gain a simple majority to pass onwards to the President. Finally, once the President assents to the bill, it passes into a law. Nevertheless, for a bill to become a legitimate law, it cannot contradict the Constitution of Botswana. If a law does go against the Constitution, the judiciary has the right to declare the legislation invalid.

Along with passing bills, the National Assembly also has the power to elect the President. This election does not occur through a vote, but instead by whether or not a party holds a majority in the National Assembly. Since the Parliament of Botswana is a combination of both the National Assembly and the President, the election of the President forms the Parliament. Then, unlike in many parliamentary systems, the President will act as both the Head of State and the Head of Government. Within this role, the President has the power to present legislation, speak, and vote. Additionally, they also have the power to summon, prorogue and dissolve the National Assembly.

Under the circumstance that the President declares a state of public emergency, the National Assembly also gains another purpose. In this scenario, the President acquires the power to independently create broad regulations that are necessary to quell the emergency. However, due to the Emergency Powers Act that was passed in 1966, in this circumstance the National Assembly has the power to act as a check and must approve the President's emergency regulations.

== History ==
=== Pre-Colonial and colonial origins ===
Often, in Botswana, chiefs govern locally by convening community meetings called “Kgotlas." Some scholars, like political scientist John Holm, point to such meetings as examples of how Tswana culture embodies themes of public discourse and debate. Evidently, these values exemplify popular notions of democratic principles.

Within this cultural context, chiefs maintained local governance throughout colonial rule. During the colonial era, the British ruled over the area of modern-day Botswana according to their policy of indirect rule. Called the Bechuanaland Protectorate at the time, the area experienced little colonial intervention relative to other areas within the region. In part, this was because Bechuanaland was not a settler colony. Furthermore, this was also due to the fact that the area avoided annexation into neighboring white supremacist South Africa. Eventually, however, colonial intervention became more centralized in 1919 when the British authorities established a Native Advisory Council at the regional level. Soon after in 1920, a European Advisory Council followed. Then, for the next 36 years, these councils acted separately until the formation of a Joint Advisory Council. This council did not have the power to pass legislation, but could debate and comment on existing legislation. However, British colonial authorities often constructed these councils on a foundation of exploitative interests. As a result, they often upheld and enforced colonial economic extraction.

=== Independence and the creation of a legislature ===
In 1959, the resident commissioner of Botswana, Peter Fawcus, worked alongside prominent Batswana figures such as Seretse Khama to create a new Legislative Council. This council had the power to pass laws and would play an integral role in the transition to independence. Composing this council were ten government officials, ten Africans, ten Europeans, and one Asian resident of Botswana. Most of the members representing the Africans and Europeans came from newly established African and European Councils. Legislative Councils (LegCos) like this one were not isolated to Botswana and were instead common in late British colonial rule. Ken Opalo, an expert of legislative politics, notes that colonial officials frequently dominated LegCos during their existence. Consequently, LegCos often worked to progress the desires of the colonial authority. During the transition to independence, this involved empowering executives and limiting legislative rule itself. In many other postcolonial states, this contributed to decades of autocracy.

Eventually, as British colonial rule began to wane, Seretse Khama met with the African members of the council in 1962 to form the Bechuanaland Democratic Party (BDP). Then, soon after this event, a group composed of chiefs, white residents, and members of Botswana’s newly established political parties convened to draft the future Constitution of Botswana. In this Constitution were the outlines for the National Assembly. Then, in March of 1965, the first elections occurred with three political parties taking part in the campaign. The BDP won 81 percent of vote and 28 out of 31 available seats in the assembly. It was soon after these elections that the country officially secured independence in 1966.

=== Post-Independence and the dominance of the BDP ===
Though many African countries experienced decades of single-party rule until the 1990s, Botswana has had 5 peaceful presidential transitions and consistent multi-party democracy since independence. The Botswana Democratic Party, formerly Bechuanaland Democratic Part, always won a majority of seats in the National Assembly from independence until 2024 and is an ongoing symbol of the national liberation movement.

Meanwhile, unlike the BDP, the opposition parties in the National Assembly have routinely changed since independence. During the 1990s, urbanization and the sudden prominence of the mining sector weakened the BDP’s agriculturally centered political base. Because of this perceived fragility, some of the opposition parties were able to merge into the Botswana National Front (BNF) and almost created a unified opposition party to counter the BDP. In the late 1990s, however, the BNF fractured and did not come close to rivaling the BDP again.

Yet, despite the inconsistency of the opposition, BDP’s dominance has routinely created concern among members of opposition parties about whether the National Assembly can act as a proper check against the President. In particular, many see a problem with lack of separation between the National Assembly and the executive in the formation of Parliament. In addition to this concern, political science scholars such as David Sebudubudu note that the President holds direct influence over MPs because 42% of the National Assembly is also in the President’s Cabinet. In a critique of the National Assembly, Sebudubudu and his colleagues explain that loyalty and personal ambitions may impede the ability for BDP party members to be free-acting in the assembly. Stemming from this general concern, in 1988 the National Assembly passed a motion urging the separation of Parliament, and thus the National Assembly, from the office of the President. Then, in 2002, speaker Ray Molomo echoed this motion when he asked a special team to look into forming a National Assembly independent of the executive. More recently during the 2010s, concern over the executive's power led an opposition party, Botswana Movement for Democracy (BMD), to accuse BDP of autocracy.

Along with this concern about BDP’s dominance is also anxiety about the few women MPs in the National Assembly. After the 2009 national elections when only two women were directly elected to the assembly, some political scientists like Gretchen Bauer expressed worry over how the representation of women was not increasing over time. Although women candidates are usually competitive in elections, it is often difficult for them to advance past the primary stage for political parties. Additionally, along this vein of representation, scholars like research fellow James Kirby have also expressed that there is little space for minority ethnic groups like the Basarwa to express their opinions within the National Assembly.

After the 2019 general elections, the concern over the few women MPs resurfaced once again as only 3 women were elected to the National Assembly. In order to address this problem, president Mokgweetsi Masisi chose to nominate four women to the specially elected seats. Among the members nominated was notable human rights activist Dr. Unity Dow and financial official Peggy Serame.

Following these nominations, a different significant event for the National Assembly occurred in March of 2020. Because of the COVID-19 pandemic, President Masisi called for a six month state of public emergency in order to address the virus. This was only the second state of public emergency declaration in Botswana’s history. Yet, even though the National Assembly eventually approved the six month state of public emergency, there was still concern among members of opposition parties because of the powers that it would invest upon the president. As a result, the debate over approving the state of public emergency was shown on national television for the purpose of improving transparency. Soon after, Botswana's National Assembly drew international attention because all members of Parliament, including the President, were forced to quarantine due to exposure to the COVID-19 virus.

== Elections ==
=== Processes and trends ===
The National Assembly is the only part of the Botswana National Government that private citizens elect. Botswana uses a first-past-the-post system for elections whereby candidates with the most votes win single-member constituencies. Originally, voting occurred with disks that corresponded to various candidates based on color. Then, in 1999, the national elections switched to using paper ballots. Regarding voter safety, 89% of Afrobarometer survey respondents expressed that they were able to vote freely without external pressure.

Elections for the Botswana National Assembly occur every 5 years, with the last election occurring in 2024. For some political parties, elections for MPs are preceded by primaries. However, hosting primaries is not a legal obligation in Botswana. Additionally, there is currently no gender quota system for elections to the National Assembly. In a 2019 survey, support for a gender quota system was nearly evenly split: 48% approved and 47% disapproved.

In order to be a candidate for MP, a person must be 18 years old, registered to vote, and also a citizen of Botswana. They also must be able to read and speak English. Along with this, there are circumstances in which a person can be disqualified from office. For example, a person cannot be bankrupt, labeled insane, or sentenced to imprisonment longer than six months. They also cannot actively be either a member of Ntlo ya Dikgosi or a public official that oversees elections.

From 1965 to 2024, the BDP won a majority of seats in the National Assembly in every election. Yet, even though the BDP received consistent support (especially from rural constituencies), there was evidence that elections are growing more competitive over time. Over the course of the 2000s, the number of competitive constituencies increased. Along with this, the BDP secured more of its seats through pluralities instead of majorities in recent elections. In 2014, for the first time in the nation’s history, opposition parties won a majority of the total votes. Then, during the 2019 elections, former President Ian Khama switched loyalty and endorsed the opposition party Umbrella for Democratic Change (UDC). Despite both of these notable events, however, the BDP maintained its majority of seats in the National Assembly. In the 2019 elections, the BDP won 29 seats and the UDC was well behind with only 13 seats. Three of the four remaining seats went to the Botswana Patriotic Front, while the other went to the Alliance for Progressives. The BDP was defeated for the first time in 2024, only obtaining 4 of the 61 contested seats (4th place) and obtaining 30.47% of votes (second place).

Regarding voter participation, there were 900,000 voters who were registered for the 2019 elections. Additionally, the 2019 Afrobarometer survey showed that 63% of people (64% of women and 62% of men) voted in the 2014 parliamentary elections. Previously, in 1999, concern over voter participation had been a prominent news story in the country. Before the 1999 elections, 60,000 potential voters were accidentally disqualified when voter rolls were completed too late. Festus Mogae, who was the President at the time, declared the nation’s first state of public emergency in order to call the National Assembly and pass a law allowing unintentionally disenfranchised people to vote.

2024 general election results by constituency

=== Previous National Assembly election results ===
BPP / BCP / UDC / UDC / BNF / AP / BPF / BAM / BIP / Ind. / BDP / BMD		Total seats
1965	3 / 28	31
1969	3 / 3 / 1 / 24	31
1974	2 / 2 / 1 / 27	32
1979	1 / 2 / 29	32
1984	1 / 5 / 28	34
1989	3 / 31	34
1994	13 / 27	40
1999	1 / 6 / 33	40
2004	1 / 12 / 44	57
2009	4 / 6 / 1 / 1 / 45	57
2014 (With UDC)	3 / 8 / 37 / 9; 3 / 17 / 37	57
2019 (With UDC)	11 / 4 / 1 / 3 / 38; 15 / 1 / 3 / 38	57
2024 (With UDC)	4 / 15 / 23 / 6 / 5 / 4 / 4; 15 / 36 / 5 / 1 / 4	61

Note: In the pre-independence 1965 election, the Botswana Democratic Party was known as the Bechuanaland Democratic Party and the Botswana People's Party was known as the Bechuanaland People's Party. The chart also does not include ex-officio and co-opted members.

== See also ==
- 1st Parliament of Botswana
- Ntlo ya Dikgosi
- History of Botswana
- Legislative Branch
- List of speakers of the National Assembly of Botswana
- Member of Parliament (Botswana)
- List of parliamentary constituencies of Botswana
