= Botswana Congress Party =

Political party in Botswana

- President: Dumelang Saleshando
- Chairman: Sennye Obuseng
- Secretary-General: Goretetse Kekgonegile
- Vice President: Unity Dow
- Publicity Secretary: Olebile Machete
- Founded: 20 June 1998
- Split from: Botswana National Front
- Ideology: Social democracy
- Political position: Centre-left
- National affiliation: Umbrella for Democratic Change (2017–2022)
- Colours: Green
- National Assembly: 15 / 61
- Councillors: 125 / 609
- Pan African Parliament: 1 / 4

The Botswana Congress Party (BCP) is a social democratic political party in Botswana. Founded in 1998 as a result of a split from the Botswana National Front (BNF), the party attracted most of the BNF's sitting MPs due to a leadership dispute involving the BNF's leader, Kenneth Koma.

== History ==
The BCP was formed by 11 sitting MPs and immediately became the official opposition in parliament. Party president Michael Dingake served as Leader of the Opposition until parliament was dissolved in advance of the 1999 general elections. In the 1999 general elections, the BCP won 11.9% of the vote and retained only one seat (out of 40). In the elections, 30 October 2004, the party won 16.6% of the popular vote and one out of 57 seats. The sole BCP member of parliament was Dumelang Saleshando, the son of then BCP president, Gilson Saleshando.

In 2009, the party contested the 2009 election in a pact with the Botswana Alliance Movement. However, talks to form an alliance with the Botswana National Front proved fruitless.

The 2009 elections proved a decisive success for the party. The BCP won 19.2% of the popular vote and four parliamentary seats. Its 19.2% popular vote makes it the third largest political movement in Botswana. The BCP retained the Gaborone Central constituency and won the Chobe, Okavango, and Selebi Phikwe West constituencies from the BDP. Pact partner BAM won 2.3% of the vote and defeated the former Minister of Education and Skills Development, Jacob Nkate, in the Ngami constituency. Despite its losses to the BCP, the BDP won enough constituencies from the BNF to increase its overall representation by one seat.

In May 2010, the BCP and the BAM merged under the BCP label with a new party symbol that incorporates elements of the parent parties. Following the merger, the BCP controlled five seats in the National Assembly.

On 4 September 2010, the BCP contested by elections in Tonota North constituency with the support of the other three opposition parties, Botswana National Front (BNF), Botswana Peoples Party (BPP) and the BDP breakaway party Botswana Movement for Democracy (BMD). The BCP candidate increased her vote share slightly, to 36.1%, but lost to the ruling Botswana Democratic Party (BDP).The party recently lost a key member, Member of parliament for Okavango Hon Bagalatia Aaron, who defected to the ruling Botswana Democratic Party.

== Electoral history ==
=== National Assembly ===
Election	Party leader	Votes	%	Seats	+/–	Position	Status
1999	Michael Dingake	40,096	11.90%	1 / 40	New	▲3rd	Opposition
2004	Otlaadisa Koosaletse	68,556	16.62%	1 / 57	0	3rd	Opposition
2009	Gilson Saleshando	104,302	19.15%	4 / 57	▲3	3rd	Opposition
2014	Dumelang Saleshando	140,998	20.43%	3 / 57	▼1	3rd	Opposition
2019 (Note: Run as part of the Umbrella for Democratic Change coalition.)	Dumelang Saleshando	112,479	14.57%	11 / 57	▲8	▲2nd	Opposition
2024	Dumelang Saleshando	175,972	21.06%	15 / 61	▲4	2nd	Opposition
