= 7th Parliament of Botswana =

1994–1999 legislative meeting

The 7th Parliament of Botswana was the meeting of the National Assembly of Botswana from 1994 to 1999. It had forty standard members, four specially elected members, and two ex officio members. Its members were chosen in the 1994 Botswana general election.

== Members ==
The following members were elected during the 1994 Botswana general election.

Constituency	Member	Party
President	Quett Masire (until 31 March 1998)	Botswana Democratic Party
President	Festus Mogae (from 1 April 1998)	Botswana Democratic Party
Speaker	Moutlakgola P.K. Nwako	Botswana Democratic Party
Bobirwa	J. J. Maruatona	Botswana Democratic Party
Baro Long	Ronald Sebego	Botswana Democratic Party
Boteti	Gabofele Masusu	Botswana Democratic Party
Francistown East	Patrick K. Balopi	Botswana Democratic Party
Francistown West	Vain Mamela	Botswana National Front
Gaborone Central	Michael Dingake	Botswana National Front
Gaborone North	Maitshwarelo M. Dabutha	Botswana National Front
Gaborone South	Kenneth Koma	Botswana National Front
Gaborone West	Paul M. Rantao	Botswana National Front
Ghanzi	Johnnie Keemenao Swartz	Botswana Democratic Party
Kanye	Sidwell Gabatshwane	Botswana National Front
Kgalagadi	Lesedi J. T. Mothibamele	Botswana Democratic Party
Kgatleng West	James M. Pilane	Botswana National Front
Kweneng East	I.S. Mabiletsa	Botswana National Front
Lentswelatau	David N. Magang	Botswana Democratic Party
Letlhakeng	Boometswe Mokgothu	Botswana National Front
Lobatse	Otlaadisa Koosaletse	Botswana National Front
Mogoditshane	Mokgweetsi O. Kgosipula	Botswana National Front
Mahalapye	Mompati Merafhe	Botswana Democratic Party
Maun/Chobe	Bahiti K. Temane	Botswana Democratic Party
Mmadinare	Ponatshego Kedikilwe	Botswana Democratic Party
Molepolole	Daniel Kwelagobe	Botswana Democratic Party
Moshopa	Edison Masisi	Botswana Democratic Party
Ngami	Jacob Dickie Nkate	Botswana Democratic Party
Ngwaketse South	Geofrey Mosimakoko	Botswana National Front
Ngwaketse West	Michael R. Tshipinare	Botswana Democratic Party
Nkange	Obed I. Chilume	Botswana Democratic Party
North-East	Chapson J. Butale	Botswana Democratic Party
Okavango	Joseph Kavindama	Botswana National Front
Palapye	Festus Mogae	Botswana Democratic Party
Sebina/Gweta	Olifant Mfa	Botswana Democratic Party
Selebi/Phikwe	Gilson Saleshando	Botswana National Front
Serowe North	Roy Blackbeard	Botswana Democratic Party
Serowe South	Gaositwe K.T. Chiepe	Botswana Democratic Party
Shoshong	Modibedi M. Robi	Botswana Democratic Party
South-East	G.M. Oteng	Botswana Democratic Party
Thamaga	Gladys K. Theresa Kokorwe	Botswana Democratic Party
Tonota	Lemme Makgekgenene	Botswana Democratic Party
Tswapong North	Thebe D. Mogami	Botswana Democratic Party
Tswapong South	P. K. Seloma	Botswana Democratic Party
Specially elected	George Kgoroba	
Specially elected	Margret Nasha	
Specially elected	Joy Phumaphi	
Specially elected	Jerry Gabaake	
