= 6th Parliament of Botswana =

1989–1994 legislative meeting

The 6th Parliament of Botswana was the meeting of the National Assembly of Botswana from 1989 to 1994. It had thirty four standard members, four specially elected members, and two ex officio members. Its members were chosen in the 1989 Botswana general election.

== Members ==
The following members were elected during the 1989 Botswana general election.

Constituency	Member	Party
President	Quett Masire	Botswana Democratic Party
Speaker	Moutlakgola P.K. Nwako	Botswana Democratic Party
Bobirwa	James J. Maruatona	Botswana Democratic Party
Lobatse/Barolong	Ronald Sebego	Botswana Democratic Party
Boteti	Gabofele Masusu	Botswana Democratic Party
Francistown	Patrick K. Balopi	Botswana Democratic Party
Gaborone North	Maitshwarelo M. Dabutha	Botswana National Front
Gaborone South	Kenneth Koma	Botswana National Front
Ghanzi	Johnnie Keemenao Swartz	Botswana Democratic Party
Kanye	Archibald M. Mogwe	Botswana Democratic Party
Kgalagadi	Lesedi J. T. Mothibamele	Botswana Democratic Party
Kgatleng/Tlokweng	Washington R. Meswele	Botswana Democratic Party
Kweneng East	David Ntsimele Magang	Botswana Democratic Party
Kweneng South	Peter Mmusi	Botswana Democratic Party
Kweneng West	Boometswe Mokgothu	Botswana Democratic Party
Mahalapye	Gaolese Kent Koma	Botswana Democratic Party
Maun/Chobe	Ketaraka B. Temane	Botswana Democratic Party
Mmadinare	Ponatshego Kedikilwe	Botswana Democratic Party
Mochudi	Matlapeng Ray Molomo	Botswana Democratic Party
Molepolole	Daniel Kwelagobe	Botswana Democratic Party
Moshopa	Edison Masisi	Botswana Democratic Party
Ngami	Gaerolwe Mesho Kwerepe	Botswana Democratic Party
Ngwaketse South	Duke Tebogo Pule	Botswana Democratic Party
Ngwaketse West	Michael R. Tshipinare	Botswana Democratic Party
Nkange	Obed I. Chilume	Botswana Democratic Party
North-East	Chapson J. Butale	Botswana Democratic Party
Okavango	Joseph Kavindama	Botswana National Front
Sebina/Gweta	Richard Ndwapi	Botswana Democratic Party
Selebi/Phikwe	Kebatlamang Morake	Botswana Democratic Party
Serowe North	Roy Blackbeard	Botswana Democratic Party
Serowe South	Gaositwe K.T. Chiepe	Botswana Democratic Party
Shoshong	Esther Mosinyi	Botswana Democratic Party
Ramotswa	Geoffrey M. Oteng	Botswana Democratic Party
Tonota	Lemme Makgekgenene	Botswana Democratic Party
Tswapong North	Moutlakgola P.K. Nwako	Botswana Democratic Party
Tswapong South	Pelokgale Seloma	Botswana Democratic Party
Specially elected	Festus Mogae	
Specially elected	Mompati Merafhe	
Specially elected	Gaotlhaetse Matlhabaphiri	
Specially elected	Vista Moruti	
