= 8th Parliament of Botswana =

1999–2004 legislative meeting

The 8th Parliament of Botswana was the meeting of the National Assembly of Botswana from 1999 to 2004. It had forty standard members, four specially elected members, and two ex officio members. Its members were chosen in the 1999 Botswana general election.

== Members ==
The following members were elected during the 1999 Botswana general election.

Constituency	Member	Party
President	Festus Mogae	Botswana Democratic Party
Speaker	Matlapeng Ray Molomo	Botswana Democratic Party
Bobirwa	J. J. Maruatona	Botswana Democratic Party
Baro Long	R. Sebego	Botswana Democratic Party
Boteti	Slumber Tsogwane	Botswana Democratic Party
Francistown East	Joy J. Phumaphi	Botswana Democratic Party
Francistown West	Tshelang Masisi	Botswana Democratic Party
Gaborone Central	Margaret Nasha	Botswana Democratic Party
Gaborone North	M. K. Mzwinila	Botswana National Front
Gaborone South	K. Koma	Botswana National Front
Gaborone West	Robert K. Molefhabangwe	Botswana National Front
Ghanzi	Johnnie Keemenao Swartz	Botswana Democratic Party
Kanye	Omphitlhetse O. Maswabi	Botswana National Front
Kgalagadi	L. Mothibamele	Botswana Democratic Party
Kgatleng West	Rakwadi John Modipane	Botswana Democratic Party
Kweneng East	I. J. Davids	Botswana Democratic Party
Len/Tau	D. N. Magang	Botswana Democratic Party
Letlhakeng	B. Mokgothu	Botswana National Front
Lobatse	Nehemiah Modubule	Botswana Democratic Party
M/Tshane	G. K. Kgoroba	Botswana Democratic Party
Mahalapye	Mompati Merafhe	Botswana Democratic Party
Maun/Chobe	B. K. Temane	Botswana Democratic Party
Mmadinare	Ponatshego Kedikilwe	Botswana Democratic Party
Molepolole	Daniel Kwelagobe	Botswana Democratic Party
Moshopa	M. G. K. Mooka	Botswana Democratic Party
Ngami	Jacob Dickie Nkate	Botswana Democratic Party
Ngwaketse South	K. Kalake	Botswana National Front
Ngwaketse West	M. R. Tshipinare	Botswana Democratic Party
Nkange	Ambrose Masalila	Botswana Democratic Party
North-East	C. J. Butale	Botswana Democratic Party
Okavango	J. K. Kavindama	Botswana Congress Party
Palapye	Lephimotswe B. Sebetela	Botswana Democratic Party
S/Gweta	Olifant Mfa	Botswana Democratic Party
S/Phikwe	D. S. Pholo	Botswana Democratic Party
Serowe North	Ian Khama	Botswana Democratic Party
Serowe South	T. Seretse	Botswana Democratic Party
Shoshong	Gobopang Duke Lefhoko	Botswana Democratic Party
South-East	Lesego Ethel Motsumi	Botswana Democratic Party
Thamaga	Gladys K. Theresa Kokorwe	Botswana Democratic Party
Tonota	Pono P. P. Moatlhodi	Botswana Democratic Party
Tswapong North	Thebe D. Mogami	Botswana Democratic Party
Tswapong South	P. K. Seloma	Botswana Democratic Party
Specially elected	Baledzi Gaolathe	
Specially elected	Pelonomi Venson	
Specially elected	Shirley Segokgo	
Specially elected	Satar Dada	

== See also ==
- Elections in Botswana
- Politics of Botswana
