= 10th Parliament of Botswana =

This is a list of the members of the National Assembly of Botswana between 2009 and 2014. There were 57 constituency MPs and 4 specially elected MPs. They were elected in the 2009 general elections. Following the elections, several MPs broke away from the ruling Botswana Democratic Party to form an opposition party, the Botswana Movement for Democracy.

== List of MPs ==
Member	Constituency	Party
Khama, Seretse Khama Ian	President	Botswana Democratic Party
Bolele, Bernard	Mahalapye West	Botswana Democratic Party
Nasha, Margaret N.	Speaker	Botswana Democratic Party
Skelemani, Phandu	Francistown East	Botswana Democratic Party
Kwelagobe, Daniel	Molepolole South	Botswana Democratic Party
Seretse, Dikgakgamatso R.	Serowe North East	Botswana Democratic Party
Venson-Moitoi, Pelonomi	Serowe South	Botswana Democratic Party
Molefhi, Nonofo E.	Selebi Phikwe East	Botswana Democratic Party
Siele, Peter L.	Ngwaketse South	Botswana Democratic Party
Molatlhegi, Kagiso P.	Gaborone South	Botswana Democratic Party
Toto, John K.	Kgalagadi South	Botswana National Front
Saleshando, Gilson	Selibe-Phikwe West	Botswana Congress Party
De Graaf, Christian	Ghanzi South	Botswana Democratic Party
Swartz, Johnnie K.	Gantsi North	Botswana Democratic Party
Kedikilwe, Ponatshego H.	Mmadinare	Botswana Democratic Party
Arone, Bagalatia	Okavango	Botswana Congress Party
Mokaila, Onkokame K.	Borolong	Botswana Democratic Party
Somolekae, Gloria	Specially elected	Botswana Democratic Party
Guma, Samson M.	Tati East	Botswana Democratic Party
Makgalemele, Dikgang P.	Shoshong	Botswana Democratic Party
Kgathi, Shaw	Bobirwa	Botswana Democratic Party
Mokalake, Lebonamang T.	Boteti South	Botswana Democratic Party
Batshu, Edwin J.	Nkange	Botswana Democratic Party
Kesupile, Abram	Kanye South	Botswana National Front
Matlhabaphiri, Gaotlhaetse U.	Molepolole North	Botswana Democratic Party
Ramsden, Frank J.	Maun East	Botswana Democratic Party
Seakgosing, John	Kweneng South	Botswana Democratic Party
Pheto, Moeng R.	Kweneng East	Botswana Democratic Party
Seretse, Vincent	Specially elected	Botswana Democratic Party
Khwae, Phillip	Kgalagadi North	Botswana National Front
Matambo, Ontefetse K.	Specially elected	Botswana Democratic Party
Moatlhodi, Pono P. P.	Tonota South	Botswana Democratic Party
Masisi, Tshelang W.	Francistown West	Botswana Democratic Party
Rakhudu, Keletso J.	Gaborone North	Botswana Democratic Party
Masitara, Robert	Gaborone West North	Botswana Democratic Party
Makgato-Malesu, Dorcus	Specially elected	Botswana Democratic Party
Masisi, Mokgweetsi E.	Moshupa	Botswana Democratic Party
Khama, Tshekedi	Serowe North West	Botswana Democratic Party
Ntuane, Botsalo	Gaborone West South	Botswana Democratic Party
Mabiletsa, Isaac S.	Kgatleng East	Botswana Congress Party
Mangole, Gilbert	Kgatleng West	Botswana Movement for Democracy
Goya, Moiseraele	Palapye	Botswana Democratic Party
Modubule, Nehemiah M.	Lobatse	Botswana Movement for Democracy
Reatile, Mephato R.	Ngwaketse West	Botswana Democratic Party
Mmolotsi, Wynter	Francistown South	Botswana Movement for Democracy
Nshimwe, Gibson	Chobe	Botswana Congress Party
Maele, Prince	Tswapong North	Botswana Democratic Party
Masimolole, Patrick M. G.	Mogoditshane	Botswana Democratic Party
Kablay, Liakat	Letlhakeng East	Botswana Democratic Party
Moremi II, Kgosi Tawana	Maun West	Botswana Movement for Democracy
Raletobana, Mmoloki E.	Kweneng South East	Botswana Democratic Party
Saleshando, Dumelang	Gaborone Central	Botswana Congress Party
Habano, Taolo G.	Ngami	Botswana Congress Party
Motlhale, Odirile	South East South	Botswana Democratic Party
Motowane, Maxwell	Letlhakeng West	Botswana Democratic Party
Tshireletso, Botlogile M.	Mahalapye East	Botswana Democratic Party
Tsogwane, Slumber	Boteti North	Botswana Democratic Party
Rammidi, Kentse	Kanye North	Botswana Congress Party
Makosha, Rayner	Nata/Gweta	Botswana Democratic Party
Molebatsi, Oreeditse S.	Tswapong South	Botswana Democratic Party
Gaborone, Olebile M.	South East North	Botswana Democratic Party
Tibone, Charles M.	Tati West	Botswana Democratic Party
