= Molepolole North =

Parliamentary constituency in Botswana

- Single-member constituency for the National Assembly
- District: Kweneng
- Population: 48,310
- Electorate: 22,347
- Major settlements: Molepolole
- Area: 1,163 km^{2}

Current constituency
- Created: 1965
- Party: UDC
- MP: Arafat Khan
- Margin of victory: 3,057 (17.1 pp)

Molepolole North is a constituency in the Kweneng District represented by Arafat Khan, a UDC Member of Parliament in the National Assembly of Botswana since 2024.

== Constituency profile ==
Molepolole North has existed since the inaugural 1965 general election, when it was first contested as Molepolole North. It was renamed Molepolole from the 1974 general election and retained that name until the 1999 election. Since the 2004 general election, it has again been contested as Molepolole North.

The constituency is centred on the northern part of Molepolole, one of Botswana's largest traditional villages and the principal settlement of the Bakwena people.

The constituency has the following localities:

1. Part of Molepolole
2. Thebephatshwa
3. Mapharangwane
4. Hatsalatladi
5. Mogonono

== Members of Parliament ==
Key: BDP UDC UDC

Election	Winner
1965 election	Stephen Thobega
1969 election	Daniel Kwelagobe
1974 election	Daniel Kwelagobe
1979 election	Daniel Kwelagobe
1984 election	Daniel Kwelagobe
1989 election	Daniel Kwelagobe
1994 election	Daniel Kwelagobe
1999 election	Daniel Kwelagobe
2004 election	Gaotlhaetse Matlhabaphiri
2009 election	Gaotlhaetse Matlhabaphiri
2014 election	Mohammed Khan
2019 election	Oabile Regoeng
2024 election	Arafat Khan

== Election results ==
=== 2024 election ===
General election 2024: Molepolole North
Party	Candidate	Votes	%	±%
UDC	Arafat Khan	9,729	54.50	+28.75
BDP	Bashi Kgakge	6,672	37.38	−30.19
BCP	Lebang Ramatokwane	811	4.54	N/A
BPF	Gaolatlhe Molefane	474	2.66	N/A
Independent	Davis Mogapi	122	0.68	N/A
Independent	Ofentse Keepilwe	43	0.24	N/A
Margin of victory		3,057	17.13	N/A
Total valid votes		17,851	99.17	−0.26
Rejected ballots		150	0.83	+0.26
Turnout		18,001	80.55	−4.54
Registered electors		22,347		
UDC gain from BDP		Swing	+29.47	

=== 2019 election ===
General election 2019: Molepolole North
Party	Candidate	Votes	%	±%
BDP	Oabile Regoeng	11,049	67.56	+27.53
UDC	Mohammed Khan	4,211	25.75	−33.42
AP	Twoba Koontse	1,001	6.12	N/A
Independent	Nonofo Mosung	93	0.57	−0.24
Margin of victory		6,838	41.81	N/A
Total valid votes		16,354	99.42	+0.37
Rejected ballots		95	0.58	−0.37
Turnout		16,449	85.10	−3.31
Registered electors		19,330		
BDP gain from UDC		Swing	+30.48	

=== 2014 election ===
General election 2014: Molepolole North
Party	Candidate	Votes	%	±%
UDC	Mohammed Khan	8,854	59.16	+13.58
BDP	Gaotlhaetse Matlhabaphiri	5,990	40.03	−11.87
Independent	Nonofo Mosung	121	0.81	N/A
Margin of victory		2,864	19.14	N/A
Total valid votes		14,965	99.05	+0.36
Rejected ballots		143	0.95	−0.36
Turnout		15,108	88.40	+9.45
Registered electors		17,090		
UDC gain from BDP		Swing	+12.73	

=== 2009 election ===
General election 2009: Molepolole North
Party	Candidate	Votes	%	±%
BDP	Gaotlhaetse Matlhabaphiri	5,595	51.90	−0.86
BNF	Mohammed Khan	4,914	45.58	−1.65
BCP	Wilson Phoi	271	2.51	N/A
Margin of victory		681	6.32	+0.79
Total valid votes		10,780	98.69	+0.96
Rejected ballots		143	1.31	−0.96
Turnout		10,923	78.95	−0.92
Registered electors		13,835		
BDP hold		Swing	+0.39	

=== 2004 election ===
General election 2004: Molepolole North
Party	Candidate	Votes	%	±%
BDP	Gaotlhaetse Matlhabaphiri	4,370	52.77	−16.92
BNF	Mohammed Khan	3,912	47.23	+16.92
Margin of victory		458	5.53	−33.85
Total valid votes		8,282	97.73	+1.89
Rejected ballots		192	2.27	−1.89
Turnout		8,474	79.87	+0.37
Registered electors		10,610		
BDP hold		Swing	−16.92	

=== 1999 election ===
General election 1999: Molepolole
Party	Candidate	Votes	%	±%
BDP	Daniel Kwelagobe	6,939	69.69	−1.87
BNF	Mohammed Khan	3,018	30.31	+1.87
Margin of victory		3,921	39.38	−3.74
Total valid votes		9,957	95.84	N/A
Rejected ballots		432	4.16	N/A
Turnout		10,389	79.49	+4.36
Registered electors		13,069		
BDP hold		Swing	−1.87	

=== 1994 election ===
General election 1994: Molepolole
Party	Candidate	Votes	%	±%
BDP	Daniel Kwelagobe	5,515	71.56	−6.51
BNF	V. Busang	2,192	28.44	+6.51
Margin of victory		3,323	43.12	−13.03
Turnout		7,707	75.13	+4.54
Registered electors		10,258		
BDP hold		Swing	−6.51	

=== 1989 election ===
General election 1989: Molepolole
Party	Candidate	Votes	%	±%
BDP	Daniel Kwelagobe	6,530	78.07	−4.06
BNF	Welly Seboni	1,834	21.93	+4.06
Margin of victory		4,696	56.15	−8.11
Turnout		8,364	70.59	−8.82
Registered electors		11,849		
BDP hold		Swing	−4.06	

=== 1984 election ===
General election 1984: Molepolole
Party	Candidate	Votes	%	±%
BDP	Daniel Kwelagobe	6,227	82.13	−9.38
BNF	Monametsi Leshona	1,355	17.87	+9.38
Margin of victory		4,872	64.26	−18.76
Turnout		7,582	79.41	+25.00
Registered electors		9,548		
BDP hold		Swing	−9.38	

=== 1979 election ===
General election 1979: Molepolole
Party	Candidate	Votes	%	±%
BDP	Daniel Kwelagobe	5,465	91.51	+0.52
BNF	V. Busang	507	8.49	−0.52
Margin of victory		4,958	83.02	+1.03
Turnout		5,972	54.40	+27.60
Registered electors		10,977		
BDP hold		Swing	+0.52	

=== 1974 election ===
General election 1974: Molepolole
Party	Candidate	Votes	%	±%
BDP	Daniel Kwelagobe	1,869	90.99	+17.33
BNF	S. Gower	185	9.01	−17.33
Margin of victory		1,684	81.99	+34.66
Turnout		2,054	26.80	−21.54
Registered electors		7,663		
BDP hold		Swing	+17.33	

=== 1969 election ===
General election 1969: Molepolole North
Party	Candidate	Votes	%	±%
BDP	Daniel Kwelagobe	881	73.66	−7.88
BNF	G. Kgakge	315	26.34	N/A
Margin of victory		566	47.32	−15.76
Turnout		1,196	48.34	−24.56
Registered electors		2,474		
BDP hold		Swing	N/A	

=== 1965 election ===
General election 1965: Molepolole North
Party	Candidate	Votes	%
BDP	Stephen Thobega	2,933	81.54
BPP	G. Kgakge	664	18.46
Margin of victory		2,269	63.08
Turnout		3,597	72.90
Registered electors		N/A	
BDP win (new seat)			
