= Gaborone (Botswana constituency) =

Parliamentary constituency in Gaborone, 1974–1984

- Former Single-member constituency for the National Assembly
- Boundary of Gaborone in Botswana
- District: Gaborone
- Major settlements: Gaborone

Former constituency
- Created: 1974
- Abolished: 1984
- Created from: Gaborone/Ramotswa
- Replaced by: Gaborone North; Gaborone South

Gaborone was the constituency that represented the city of Gaborone in the National Assembly of Botswana from 1974 to 1984, following its separation from Gaborone/Ramotswa in 1972 and until its division in 1984 into two constituencies, Gaborone North and Gaborone South. It was represented by an MP in the National Assembly of Botswana, elected by first-past-the-post voting system.

== Members of Parliament ==
Key: BDP

Election	Winner
1974 election	Welly Seboni
1979 election	Peter Mmusi

== Election results ==
=== 1979 election ===
General election 1979: Gaborone
Party	Candidate	Votes	%	±%
BDP	Peter Mmusi	2,661	54.73	−18.58
BNF	Kenneth Koma	1,973	40.58	+15.27
BPP	Lingisisani Kula	228	4.69	N/A
Margin of victory		688	14.15	−33.82
Turnout		4,862	61.53	+31.07
Registered electors		7,902		
BDP hold		Swing	−16.93	

=== 1974 election ===
General election 1974: Gaborone
Party	Candidate	Votes	%
BDP	Welly Seboni	1,195	73.31
BNF	Kenneth Koma	413	25.34
Independent	L. Kgang	22	1.35
Margin of victory		782	−47.97
Turnout		1,640	30.46
Registered electors		5,384	
BDP win (new seat)			
