= Kgatleng West =

Parliamentary constituency in Botswana

- Single-member constituency for the National Assembly
- District: Kgatleng
- Population: 37,923
- Electorate: 16,675
- Major settlements: Mochudi; Bokaa; Rasesa
- Area: 3,717 km^{2}

Current constituency
- Created: 1994
- Party: BCP
- Created from: Mochudi
- MP: Unity Dow
- Margin of victory: 196 (1.5 pp)

Kgatleng West is a constituency in the Kgatleng District represented by Unity Dow, a BCP MP in the National Assembly of Botswana since 2024.

== Constituency profile ==
Kgatleng West was created from the former Mochudi constituency ahead of the 1994 general election. It was contested as Mochudi West in the 2014 and 2019 general elections, before being contested again as Kgatleng West from the 2024 general election onwards.

The constituency has the following localities:

1. Bokaa
2. Dikgonnye
3. Khurutshe
4. Morwa
5. Bodungwane
6. Artesia
7. Pilane
8. Rasesa
9. Leshibitse
10. Kgomodiatshaba
11. Part of Mochudi

== Members of Parliament ==
Key: BNF BDP UDC BCP

Election	Winner
1994 election	James Pilane
1999 election	Rakwadi Modipane
2004 election	Rakwadi Modipane
2009 election	Gilbert Mangole
2014 election	Gilbert Mangole
2019 election	Mmusi Kgafela
2024 election	Unity Dow

== Election results ==
=== 2024 election ===
General election 2024: Kgatleng West
Party	Candidate	Votes	%	±%
BCP	Unity Dow	4,425	33.07	N/A
BDP	Daniel Molokwe	4,229	31.61	−32.66
UDC	Kenneth Rapoo	3,522	26.32	−2.11
BPF	Bright Molebatsi	1,204	9.00	N/A
Margin of victory		196	1.46	N/A
Total valid votes		13,380	98.35	−1.04
Rejected ballots		225	1.65	+1.04
Turnout		13,605	81.59	−5.27
Registered electors		16,675		
BCP gain from BDP		Swing	N/A	

=== 2019 election ===
General election 2019: Mochudi West
Party	Candidate	Votes	%	±%
BDP	Mmusi Kgafela	13,234	64.26	+31.37
UDC	Kgosietsile Mmoketsi	5,856	28.44	−19.44
BMD	Gilbert Mangole	723	3.51	N/A
AP	Stephen Linchwe	627	3.04	N/A
Independent	Alfred Pilane	153	0.74	N/A
Margin of victory		7,378	35.83	N/A
Total valid votes		20,593	99.38	+0.06
Rejected ballots		128	0.62	−0.06
Turnout		20,721	86.86	−0.72
Registered electors		23,857		
BDP gain from UDC		Swing	+25.40	

=== 2014 election ===
General election 2014: Mochudi West
Party	Candidate	Votes	%	±%
UDC	Gilbert Mangole	8,856	47.87	+12.32
BDP	Unity Dow	6,085	32.89	−7.65
BCP	Alfred Pilane	3,558	19.23	−0.49
Margin of victory		2,771	14.98	N/A
Total valid votes		18,499	99.32	+0.89
Rejected ballots		127	0.68	−0.89
Turnout		18,626	87.57	+9.02
Registered electors		21,269		
UDC gain from BDP		Swing	+9.98	

=== 2009 election ===
General election 2009: Kgatleng West
Party	Candidate	Votes	%	±%
BDP	Gilbert Mangole	5,493	40.55	+2.12
BNF	Jerry Rasetshwane	4,817	35.56	−1.06
BCP	Joseph Monametsi	2,672	19.72	−2.63
Independent	Alfred Pilane	565	4.17	N/A
Margin of victory		676	4.99	+3.19
Total valid votes		13,547	98.42	+0.53
Rejected ballots		217	1.58	−0.53
Turnout		13,764	78.56	−1.11
Registered electors		17,521		
BDP hold		Swing	+1.59	

=== 2004 election ===
General election 2004: Kgatleng West
Party	Candidate	Votes	%	±%
BDP	Rakwadi Modipane	3,943	38.42	−7.91
BNF	Jerry Olefile Rasetshwane	3,758	36.62	−0.05
BCP	Motsei Madisa	2,294	22.35	+5.36
NDF	Letlotlo Kopong	267	2.60	N/A
Margin of victory		185	1.80	−7.86
Total valid votes		10,262	97.89	+1.05
Rejected ballots		221	2.11	−1.05
Turnout		10,483	79.67	+0.18
Registered electors		13,158		
BDP hold		Swing	−3.93	

=== 1999 election ===
General election 1999: Kgatleng West
Party	Candidate	Votes	%	±%
BDP	Rakwadi Modipane	4,569	46.33	+6.42
BNF	Letlotlo Kopong	3,616	36.67	−23.42
BCP	James Pilane	1,676	17.00	N/A
Margin of victory		953	9.66	N/A
Total valid votes		9,861	96.84	N/A
Rejected ballots		322	3.16	N/A
Turnout		10,183	79.49	−3.55
Registered electors		12,811		
BDP gain from BNF		Swing	+14.92	

=== 1994 election ===
General election 1994: Kgatleng West
Party	Candidate	Votes	%
BNF	James Pilane	5,582	60.09
BDP	M. Molomo	3,708	39.91
Margin of victory		1,874	20.17
Turnout		9,290	83.04
Registered electors		11,188	
BNF win (new seat)			
