= Gaborone North =

Parliamentary constituency in Gaborone

- Single-member constituency for the National Assembly
- District: Gaborone
- Population: 53,896
- Major settlements: Gaborone
- Area: 151 km^{2}

Current constituency
- Created: 1984
- Party: UDC
- Created from: Gaborone
- MP: Shawn Nthaile
- Margin of victory: 935 (6.5 pp)

Gaborone North is a constituency in Gaborone represented in the National Assembly of Botswana by Shawn Nthaile of the Umbrella for Democratic Change since 2024.

== Constituency profile ==
The constituency was originally created in 1984, following the division of the single constituency of Gaborone and has undergone multiple changes in its size and composition. Gaborone North was a safe seat for the BNF between 1984 and 2004. In the 1989 and 1994 elections it became the constituency where the BNF won by the largest margin. In 2004 it became a competitive seat between the BDP and the BNF (and later the UDC).

The urban constituency encompasses the following locations:

1. Tsholofelo
2. Tawana
3. Tshweneng
4. Phiring
5. Ledumang
6. Phokoje
7. Gaborone West Block 10
8. Tsholofelo Extension
9. Marapoathutwa – Block 8
10. Glen Valley
11. Sebele
12. Phakalane
13. Gaborone North
14. Sir Seretse Khama Airport
15. Ledumadumane

== Members of Parliament ==
Key: BNF BDP UDC UDC

Election	Winner
1984 election	Maitshwarelo Dabutha
1989 election	Maitshwarelo Dabutha
1994 election	Maitshwarelo Dabutha
1999 election	Michael Mzwinila
2004 election	Keletso Rakhudu
2009 election	Keletso Rakhudu
2014 election	Haskins Nkaigwa
2019 election	Mpho Balopi
2024 election	Shawn Nthaile

== Election results ==
=== 2024 election ===
General election 2024: Gaborone North
Party	Candidate	Votes	%	±%
UDC	Shawn Nthaile	5,356	37.28	+5.62
BCP	Emmanuel Maite	4,421	30.77	N/A
BDP	Rebaone Seema	4,072	28.34	−31.87
BMD	Thuso Tiego	396	2.76	+1.46
BPF	Virginia Boingotlo	121	0.84	N/A
Margin of victory		935	6.51	N/A
Total valid votes		14,366	99.77	+0.08
Rejected ballots		33	0.23	−0.08
Turnout		14,399	82.02	+4.14
Registered electors		17,556		
UDC gain from BDP		Swing	+18.20	

=== 2019 election ===
General election 2019: Gaborone North
Party	Candidate	Votes	%	±%
BDP	Mpho Balopi	9,566	60.21	+28.61
UDC	Haskins Nkaigwa	4,761	31.66	−12.46
AP	Thatayaone Molefe	1,085	6.83	N/A
BMD	Sydney Pilane	207	1.30	N/A
Margin of victory		4,536	28.55	N/A
Total valid votes		15,888	99.69	+0.03
Rejected ballots		50	0.31	−0.03
Turnout		15,938	77.88	−8.09
Registered electors		20,464		
BDP gain from UDC		Swing	+20.54	

=== 2014 election ===
General election 2014: Gaborone North
Party	Candidate	Votes	%	±%
UDC	Haskins Nkaigwa	5,738	44.12	+29.56
BDP	Keletso Rakhudu	4,109	31.60	−12.55
BCP	Motsei Rapelana	3,157	24.28	−17.00
Margin of victory		1,629	12.52	N/A
Total valid votes		13,004	99.66	+0.37
Rejected ballots		45	0.34	−0.37
Turnout		13,049	85.97	+9.93
Registered electors		15,178		
UDC gain from BDP		Swing	+21.05	

=== 2009 election ===
General election 2009: Gaborone North
Party	Candidate	Votes	%	±%
BDP	Keletso Rakhudu	3,741	44.15	+4.36
BCP	Motsei Rapelana	3,498	41.28	+16.14
BNF	Lemogang Ntime	1,234	14.56	−18.01
Margin of victory		243	2.87	−4.35
Total valid votes		8,473	99.29	+0.05
Rejected ballots		61	0.71	−0.05
Turnout		8,534	76.04	−0.17
Registered electors		11,223		
BDP hold		Swing	−10.25	

=== 2004 election ===
General election 2004: Gaborone North
Party	Candidate	Votes	%	±%
BDP	Keletso Rakhudu	2,480	39.79	+2.37
BNF	Patrick Kgoadi	2,030	32.57	−9.11
BCP	Moncho Moncho	1,567	25.14	+5.14
NDF	Sekgophi Bogatsu	156	2.50	N/A
Margin of victory		450	7.22	N/A
Total valid votes		7,899	99.66	+1.25
Rejected ballots		27	0.34	−1.25
Turnout		5,702	76.21	−3.78
Registered electors		10,400		
BDP gain from BNF		Swing	+5.74	

=== 1999 election ===
General election 1999: Gaborone North
Party	Candidate	Votes	%	±%
BNF	Michael Mzwinila	2,551	41.68	−28.37
BDP	Keletso Rakhudu	2,290	37.42	+9.05
BCP	Maitshwarelo Dabutha	1,224	20.00	−50.05
BAM	R. Mutshekwane	55	0.90	N/A
Margin of victory		261	4.26	−37.42
Total valid votes		6,120	98.41	N/A
Rejected ballots		99	1.59	N/A
Turnout		6,219	79.99	+1.74
Registered electors		7,775		
BNF hold		Swing	−18.71	

=== 1994 election ===
General election 1994: Gaborone North
Party	Candidate	Votes	%	±%
BNF	Maitshwarelo Dabutha	4,039	70.05	+7.35
BDP	Walter Dube	1,636	28.37	−7.59
BPP	Lingisisani Kuli	91	1.58	+0.25
Margin of victory		2,403	41.68	+14.94
Turnout		5,766	78.25	+5.28
Registered electors		7,369		
BNF hold		Swing	+7.47	

=== 1989 election ===
General election 1989: Gaborone North
Party	Candidate	Votes	%	±%
BNF	Maitshwarelo Dabutha	4,765	62.70	+6.68
BDP	Pelotelele Tlhaodi	2,750	35.96	−6.20
BPP	Lingisisani Kuli	102	1.33	−0.49
Margin of victory		2,112	26.74	+12.88
Turnout		7,647	76.35	−0.04
Registered electors		10,480		
BNF hold		Swing	+6.44	

=== 1984 election ===
General election 1984: Gaborone North
Party	Candidate	Votes	%
BNF	Maitshwarelo Dabutha	3,629	56.02
BDP	Archibald Mogwe	2,731	42.16
BPP	Lingisisani Kuli	118	1.82
Margin of victory		898	13.86
Turnout		6,478	76.39%
Registered electors		8,480	
BNF win (new seat)			
