= Frontline States =

Loose coalition of African countries

The Frontline States (FLS) were a loose coalition of African countries from the 1960s to the early 1990s committed to ending apartheid in South Africa and South West Africa (today Namibia), and white minority rule in Rhodesia (today Zimbabwe) to 1980. The FLS included Angola, Botswana, Lesotho, Mozambique (from 1975), Tanzania, Zambia, and Zimbabwe (from 1980). The FLS disbanded after Nelson Mandela became President of South Africa in 1994.

In April 1975, the Frontline States – then consisting of Botswana, Lesotho, Tanzania and Zambia – were formally recognised as an entity as a committee of the Assembly of the Heads of State of the Organisation of African Unity. They were joined by Angola (1975), Mozambique (1975) and Zimbabwe (1980) when those countries gained their independence. Tanzanian president Julius Nyerere was the chairman until he retired in 1985. His successor was Zambian president Kenneth Kaunda. The countries' governments met regularly to coordinate security and economic policies.

Their mission was complicated by the fact that the economies of nearly all the FLS countries were dependent on South Africa, and many of their citizens worked there. Nevertheless, the FLS supported and sheltered exiled political movements opposed to apartheid and white minority rule, not only from South Africa, but also from Namibia (and Rhodesia prior to 1980). These states provided asylum for exiled South African political activists and allowed the African National Congress (ANC) and the Pan Africanist Congress (PAC) to set up headquarters within their borders. The ANC was declared as the official representative of the South African People by the United Nations and the Organization of African Unity whilst its headquarters was officially in Lusaka. Thousands of South African youth traveled to these states to receive training in guerrilla warfare.

American relations with the Frontline States reached their peak during the human rights push of the Carter administration. Under the Reagan administration's Assistant Secretary of State for African Affairs Chester Crocker, the Frontline States were engaged diplomatically to reach landmark peace accords between South Africa, Mozambique, Angola (Lusaka Protocol), and Namibia (New York Accords).

== Other uses ==
The term "frontline states" is also used for countries bordering any area of crisis in the world.

== See also ==
- Former Liberation Movements of Southern Africa
