= Former Liberation Movements of Southern Africa =

Political international in southern Africa

The Former Liberation Movements of Southern Africa (FLMSA) is a loosely organized regional political international of seven political parties which were involved in the African nationalist movements against colonialism and white-minority rule in South Africa and Rhodesia. It has its roots in the Frontline States, a loose coalition of African countries from the 1960s to the early 1990s committed to ending apartheid and white minority rule in South Africa and Rhodesia. Its original members are the African National Congress (South Africa), Chama Cha Mapinduzi (Tanzania), FRELIMO (Mozambique), the MPLA (Angola), SWAPO (Namibia), and ZAPU and ZANU–PF (Zimbabwe). In 2019, the Botswana Democratic Party joined the FLMSA.

== Members ==
Party	Abbreviation	Country	Established	National legislature seats	
Party	Abbreviation	Country	Established	Lower house	Upper house
African National Congress	ANC	South Africa	1912	159 / 400	43 / 90
Botswana Democratic Party	BDP	Botswana	1961	4 / 61	
Chama Cha Mapinduzi	CCM	Tanzania	1977	398 / 403	
Liberation Front of Mozambique	FRELIMO	Mozambique	1962	184 / 250	
People's Movement for the Liberation of Angola	MPLA	Angola	1956	124 / 220	
SWAPO Party of Namibia	SWAPO	Namibia	1960	63 / 104	28 / 42
Zimbabwe African National Union – Patriotic Front	ZANU–PF	Zimbabwe	1963	179 / 270	34 / 80

== Summits ==
City	Country	Date	Ref.
Johannesburg	South Africa	October 2000	
Harare	Zimbabwe	2001	
Johannesburg	South Africa	25 November 2008	
Dar es Salaam	Tanzania	4 May 2010	
Windhoek	Namibia	11 August 2011	
Pretoria	South Africa	6–9 March 2013	
Dar es Salaam	Tanzania	October 2013	
Maputo	Mozambique	20 November 2015	
Victoria Falls	Zimbabwe	4–8 May 2016	
	Zimbabwe	December 2017	
Windhoek	Namibia	20–22 November 2018	
Victoria Falls	Zimbabwe	8–12 September 2019	
	South Africa	July 2025	

== See also ==
- Southern African Development Community
- Frontline States
