= Matlapeng Ray Molomo =

Botswana politician (1930–2019)

Matlapeng Ray Molomo (9 January 1930 - 25 December 2019) was a politician in Botswana. Molomo was Speaker of the National Assembly of Botswana 1999–2004, and was a member of the Pan-African Parliament. Molomo attended the University of Ottawa. He has been a cabinet minister, Member of Parliament, permanent secretary, under secretary, educational planner, college principal, researcher, university lecturer, author and president of the Botswana Football Association. The story of his upbringing is no different from that of a typical Motswana boy of yester-year, who grew up among older boys at the cattle post looking after his father's cattle.

Matlapeng Ray Molomo is also a Tswana books author. He authored books such as Sebaga sa lorato, a play that was used by Botswana examination for a while. He wrote a book titled Democratic Deficit in Parliament of Botswana in 2012 about misgivings pertaining to the manner in which the Executive appears to be conflicted with both the Judiciary and Parliament. This book also offers a historical overview into the inception and manifestation of the Parliament of Botswana.

He was the president of Botswana National Front, but switched later to Botswana Democratic Party.
