= Mpho Balopi =

Motswana politician (born 1969)

President of the Botswana Democratic Party
- Incumbent
- Assumed office 10 May 2025
- Preceded by: Mokgweetsi Masisi

Minister of Employment, Labour Productivity and Skills Development
- In office 5 November 2019 – 24 December 2021
- President: Mokgweetsi Masisi
- Preceded by: Tshenolo Mabeo
- Succeeded by: Machana Shamukuni

Member of Parliament for Gaborone North
- In office 5 November 2019 – 5 September 2024
- Preceded by: Haskins Nkaigwa
- Succeeded by: Shawn Ntlhaile

Personal details
- Born: 1 August 1969 (age 57)
- Party: Botswana Democratic Party

Mpho "Poster" Balopi (born 1 August 1969) is a Motswana politician, economist and businessman who has been the President of the Botswana Democratic Party since 2025. He was the Member of Parliament for Gaborone North from 2019 until 2024.

He served in the second Masisi cabinet as Minister of Employment, Labour Productivity and Skills Development from November 2019 until his resignation from cabinet in December 2021 after a fallout with President Mokgweetsi Masisi. In September 2026, he was charged with money laundering and fraud by DCEC.

== See also ==
- Mokgweetsi Masisi
- Peggy Serame
- Slumber Tsogwane
