= Mogonono =

- Village
- Location in Botswana
- Coordinates: 24°22′48″S 25°28′1″E
- Country: Botswana
- District: Kweneng District

Population (2001)
  - Total: 201

Mogonono is a village in Kweneng District of Botswana. The village is located 10 km from the center of Molepolole, along the Molepolole–Lephepe road, and has a primary school. The population of Mogonono was 201 in 2001 census.
