= Keletso Rakhudu =

Motswana politician

- Born: Keletso Joseph Rakhudu
- Occupation: Politician
- Spouse: Mavis Rakhudu
- Children: 3

Keletso Joseph Rakhudu is a Motswana politician who served on the Pan-African Parliament representing Botswana and on the Parliament of Botswana for Gaborone as the Assistant Minister of Trade Ministry, Assistant Minister of Education and Skills Development, and Assistant Minister of Finance and Development Planning in varying times from 2004 to 2014. He was a part of the Botswana Democratic Party.

Rakhudu started politics in 1999 after being elected to the Gaborone City Council. Before his political career, he worked at Kgosi Kgari Sechele II Secondary School in Molepolole from May 1979 to January 1983, where he taught English and Geography.

Rakhudu has also worked as the chief executive officer for Longman Botswana, as a professional tswana-style guitar player and alto saxophone player under the name “Kaizur”, a developmental worker for the Botswana Music Union, a supporter of Notwane F.C., the founder/director of Funeral Services Group, a shareholding company with farms in Serokolwane, and as a farmer rearing cattle, small stock, poultry, and guinea fowls.
