= 1989 Botswana general election =

- 7 October 1989

34 of the 38 seats in the National Assembly 18 seats needed for a majority
- Registered: 367,069
- Turnout: 68.24% (of registered voters) (▼9.34pp); 47.90% (of eligible population) (▼6.28pp) (Note: National Study On Voter Apathy in Botswana (PDF). University of Botswana. IEC Botswana. 2022. p. 17.)
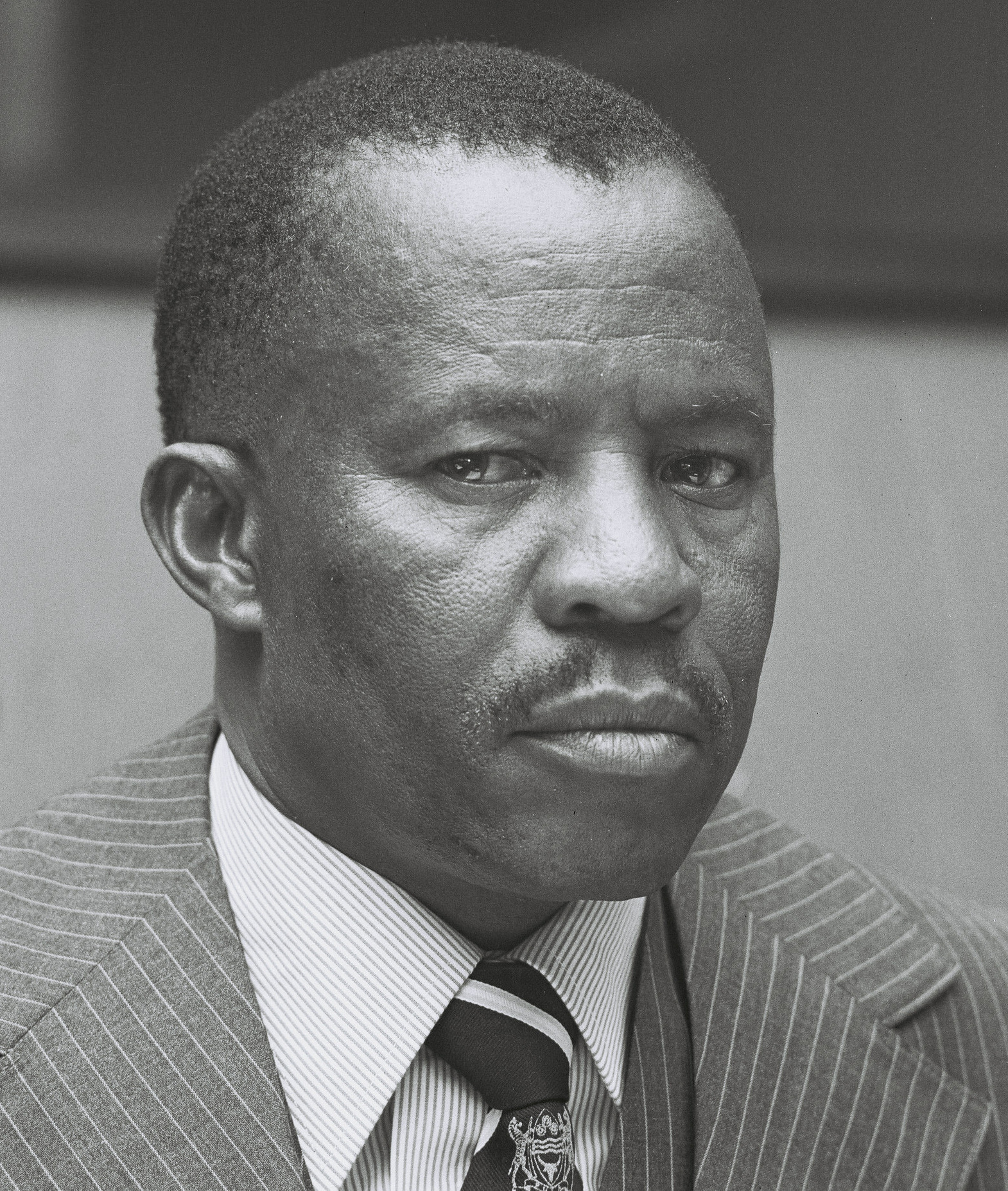

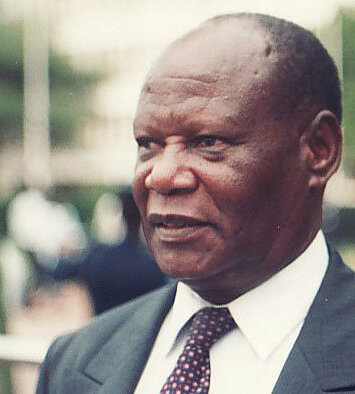
	Majority party	Minority party
Leader	Quett Masire	Kenneth Koma
Party	BDP	BNF
Leader's seat	None (Note: Incumbent presidents are ineligible to contest National Assembly seats; instead, they serve as ex-officio members of Parliament.)	Gaborone South
Last election	68.00%, 29 seats	20.44%, 4 seats
Seats won	31	3
Seat change	▲2	▼1
Popular vote	162,277	67,513
Percentage	64.78%	26.95%
Swing	▼3.22pp	▲6.51pp
- Results by constituency
President before election
Quett Masire
BDP
Elected President
Quett Masire
BDP

General elections were held in Botswana on 7 October 1989, alongside local elections. The result was a sixth straight landslide victory for the Botswana Democratic Party (BDP), which won 31 of the 34 elected seats.

As of the 2019 general elections, this is the last time the BDP received more than the 60% of the popular vote.

== Background ==
A referendum on electoral reform had been held in 1987, resulting in the creation of a Supervisor of Elections appointed by the government. Both the BDP and the Botswana National Front (BNF) held primary elections to select their candidates.

== Campaign ==
The BNF went into the elections suffering from internal instability; Bathoen Gaseitsiwe resigned as party leader in 1985 after becoming head of the Customary Court of Appeal. Prior to the elections Bathoen criticised new party leader Kenneth Koma for his left-wing policies, resigned from the BNF and established the Botswana Freedom Party (BFP). The new BFP ran as a nationalist and pro-free market party. The ruling BDP campaigned on its record in government around economic development and political stability.

A total of 91 candidates contested the elections, with the BDP being the only party to field a full slate of 34 candidates. The BNF put forward 31 candidates, the Botswana People's Party 11, the Botswana Independence Party 9, the Botswana Freedom Party 2 and the Botswana Progressive Union and Botswana Liberal Party both had a single candidate.

== Results ==
The Botswana People's Party (BPP) lost its sole seat and would not regain parliamentary representation until the 2024 elections.

Party	Votes	%	Seats	+/–
Botswana Democratic Party	162,277	64.78	31	+2
Botswana National Front	67,513	26.95	3	–1
Botswana People's Party	10,891	4.35	0	–1
Botswana Independence Party	6,209	2.48	0	0
Botswana Progressive Union	2,186	0.87	0	0
Botswana Freedom Party	1,363	0.54	0	New
Botswana Liberal Party	48	0.02	0	New
Indirectly-elected members			4	–
Total	250,487	100.00	38	0
Registered voters/turnout	367,069	–		
Source: IPU, Nohlen et al.

== Aftermath ==
Following the elections, the BNF claimed that there had been irregularities in the Mochudi constituency, where they lost to the BDP by 29 votes. The High Court ruled in the BNF's favour, resulting in a by-election in June 1990 in which the BDP retained the seat.
