= Bathoen Gaseitsiwe =

Politician and jurist from Botswana (1908–1990)

Bathoen Gaseitsiwe CBE
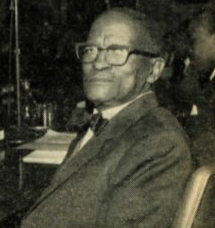

2nd Leader of the Opposition
- President: Seretse Khama; Quett Masire
- In office 19 October 1969 – 10 January 1985
- Preceded by: Philip Matante
- Succeeded by: Kenneth Koma

Member of Parliament for Kanye South
- In office 18 October 1969 – 20 July 1984
- Preceded by: Quett Masire
- Succeeded by: Archibald Mogwe

Personal details
- Born: 18 May 1908 Kanye, Bechuanaland
- Died: 3 October 1990 (aged 82) Gaborone, Botswana
- Party: Botswana National Front
- Spouse(s): Mmafane Ester Ketimetse Gaseitsiwe (died 1966)
- Children: 5
- Parent: Seepapitso III (father)
- Profession: civil servant

Bathoen Seepapitso Gaseitsiwe CBE (18 May 1908—3 October 1990) also known as Bathoen II and B2 was a Motswana kgosi, jurist and politician who served as chief of the Bangwaketse tribe from 1928 to 1969. He served as Chairman of the Botswana National Front (BNF) from 1966 to 1985, Leader of the Opposition from 1969 to 1984 and President of the Court of Appeal from 1985 until his death in 1990. He represented the Kanye South constituency in the National Assembly for three consecutive terms. As the leader of the BNF, the then second largest political party in the country, he was the main opponent of the Botswana Democratic Party (BDP) government, led by Seretse Khama and later Quett Masire, during the first two decades of Botswana's independence.

== Biography ==
Educated in local schools, then sent to South Africa from 1919 to 1927 for secondary education at Tiger Kloof and the Lovedale Missionary Institute, Bathoen II took over as chief of the Bangwaketse tribe in 1928. He worked closely with Tshekedi Khama, chief of the Bangwato tribe in the struggle to uphold tribal power over British colonial authority. He was a Senior Tribal Chief and Chairman of the Joint Advisory Council. As an opponent of Seretse Khama and his BDP, Bathoen signed, albeit reluctantly, an agreement for the drafting of a constitution and the independence of the protectorate of Bechuanaland from the United Kingdom in September 1966.

Unhappy with what he saw as an erosion of traditional tribal power in the country and the hasty democratization under Khama's rule, Bathoen abdicated his chiefship on 1 July 1969, after forty years of reign and ran as the presidential candidate for the BNF in the 1969 election. Although the BDP retained its electoral hegemony and the BNF proved to be tightly confined to Bathoen's tribal base in the south of the country, Bathoen himself defeated incumbent vice-president Quett Masire in the Kanye South constituency by an overwhelming margin, establishing himself as the Leader of the Opposition in the National Assembly.

Bathoen remained Leader of the Opposition and was subsequently re-elected in his constituency by landslides in both 1974 and 1979. During this period, he was in a persistent conflict over his party's leadership with Kenneth Koma, a founding member and exponent of the party's socialist wing, turning the BNF into a shaky coalition between tribal traditionalists and socialists. For much of Bathoen's leadership, the opposition parties found themselves restricted to ethnic and regional strongholds, unable to establish a serious contest against the BDP. Bathoen finally withdrew from the National Assembly in 1984, paving the way for Koma's election as the Leader of the Opposition. He was appointed president of the Court of Appeals the following year, a position he held until his death. He remained critical of both the government and Koma's leadership of the BNF, encouraging the formation of the Botswana Freedom Party (BFP) in the late 1980s, although he did not lead it. He died on 3 October 1992, at the age of 82.
