= Gaborone South =

Parliamentary constituency in Gaborone

- Single-member constituency for the National Assembly
- District: Gaborone
- Population: 42,519
- Major settlements: Gaborone
- Area: 44 km^{2}

Current constituency
- Created: 1984
- Party: UDC
- Created from: Gaborone
- MP: Nelson Ramaotwana
- Margin of victory: 4,740 (37.3 pp)

Gaborone South is a constituency in Gaborone City represented in the National Assembly of Botswana by Nelson Ramaotwana of the UDC since 2024.

== Constituency profile ==
The constituency was originally created in 1984, following the division of the single constituency of Gaborone and has undergone multiple changes in its size and composition. Gaborone South was a safe seat for the BNF between 1984 and 2009. It was the seat of Kenneth Koma, president of the BNF and Leader of the Opposition between 1984 and 2003. In 2009 it was narrowly won by Kagiso Patrick Molatlhegi of the BDP and has since become in a marginal BDP seat. Molatlhegi was re-elected in 2014 and succeeded in 2019 by Dumezweni Mthimkhulu, also from the BDP. The UDC flipped the seat in 2024 with a large majority.

The urban constituency encompasses the following locations:

1. Selemela
2. Dilalelo
3. Old Industrial
4. White City
5. Bontleng
6. Boitshoko
7. Mophato
8. Old Naledi
9. Babusi
10. Village

== Members of Parliament ==
Key: BNF BDP UDC

| Election | Winner |
|---|---|
| 1984 election | ~~Peter Mmusi~~ (annulled) |
| 1984 election | Kenneth Koma |
| 1989 election | Kenneth Koma |
| 1994 election | Kenneth Koma |
| 1999 election | Kenneth Koma |
| 2004 election | Akanyang Magama |
| 2009 election | Kagiso Molatlhegi |
| 2014 election | Kagiso Molatlhegi |
| 2019 election | Dumezweni Mthimkhulu |
| 2024 election | Nelson Ramaotwana |

== Election results ==
=== 2024 election ===
General election 2024: Gaborone South
| Party | Candidate | Votes | % | ±% |
|---|---|---|---|---|
| UDC | Nelson Ramaotwana | 7,668 | 60.31 | +18.21 |
| BDP | Alex Moatlhaping | 2,928 | 23.03 | −30.61 |
| BCP | Oral Mosedame | 1,742 | 13.70 | N/A |
| Independent | Kesego Okie | 220 | 1.73 | N/A |
| Independent | Mofenyi Bakwena | 131 | 1.03 | N/A |
| Independent | Boitshoko Monare | 26 | 0.20 | N/A |
| Margin of victory | | 4,740 | 37.28 | N/A |
| Total valid votes | | 12,715 | 97.76 | −1.42 |
| Rejected ballots | | 292 | 2.24 | +1.42 |
| Turnout | | 13,007 | 74.94 | −5.60 |
| Registered electors | | 17,357 | | |
| UDC gain from BDP | | Swing | +24.41 | |

=== 2019 election ===
General election 2019: Gaborone South
| Party | Candidate | Votes | % | ±% |
|---|---|---|---|---|
| BDP | Dumezweni Mthimkhulu | 6,066 | 53.64 | +19.36 |
| UDC | Nelson Ramaotwana | 4,761 | 42.10 | +9.97 |
| AP | Oabile Mafunga | 413 | 3.65 | N/A |
| BMD | Bagaisi Mabilo | 68 | 0.60 | N/A |
| Margin of victory | | 1,305 | 11.54 | +9.39 |
| Total valid votes | | 11,308 | 99.18 | −0.06 |
| Rejected ballots | | 93 | 0.82 | +0.06 |
| Turnout | | 11,401 | 80.54 | −3.15 |
| Registered electors | | 14,104 | | |
| BDP hold | | Swing | +14.67 | |

=== 2014 election ===
General election 2014: Gaborone South
| Party | Candidate | Votes | % | ±% |
|---|---|---|---|---|
| BDP | Kagiso P. Molatlhegi | 3,872 | 34.28 | −6.83 |
| UDC | Murray Moemedi Ditape | 3,629 | 32.13 | −1.89 |
| BCP | Akanyang Magama | 2,318 | 20.52 | −4.35 |
| Independent | Dumezweni M. Mthimkhulu | 1,475 | 13.06 | N/A |
| Margin of victory | | 243 | 2.15 | −4.94 |
| Total valid votes | | 11,294 | 99.24 | +0.17 |
| Rejected ballots | | 86 | 0.76 | −0.17 |
| Turnout | | 11,380 | 83.69 | +9.24 |
| Registered electors | | 13,597 | | |
| BDP hold | | Swing | −4.36 | |

=== 2009 election ===
General election 2009: Gaborone South
| Party | Candidate | Votes | % | ±% |
|---|---|---|---|---|
| BDP | Kagiso P. Molatlhegi | 2,853 | 41.11 | +6.02 |
| BNF | Akanyang Magama | 2,361 | 34.02 | −8.74 |
| BCP | Kgoberego Nkawana | 1,726 | 24.87 | +20.12 |
| Margin of victory | | 433 | 7.09 | +1.64 |
| Total valid votes | | 6,940 | 99.07 | +0.05 |
| Rejected ballots | | 65 | 0.93 | −0.05 |
| Turnout | | 7,005 | 74.45 | +0.34 |
| Registered electors | | 9,409 | | |
| BDP gain from BNF | | Swing | +7.38 | |

=== 2004 election ===
General election 2004: Gaborone South
| Party | Candidate | Votes | % | ±% |
|---|---|---|---|---|
| BNF | Akanyang Magama | 2,414 | 42.76 | −14.33 |
| BDP | G. Matlhabaphiri | 1,981 | 35.09 | −3.31 |
| NDF | Dick Bayford | 969 | 17.16 | N/A |
| BCP | Rex Ndzinge | 268 | 4.06 | +0.69 |
| MELS | Dithapelo Kgangkenna | 14 | 0.25 | N/A |
| Margin of victory | | 433 | 7.67 | −11.02 |
| Total valid votes | | 5,646 | 99.02 | +1.3 |
| Rejected ballots | | 56 | 0.98 | −1.3 |
| Turnout | | 5,702 | 74.11 | −4.72 |
| Registered electors | | 7,694 | | |
| BNF hold | | Swing | −8.82 | |

=== 1999 election ===
General election 1999: Gaborone South
| Party | Candidate | Votes | % | ±% |
|---|---|---|---|---|
| BNF | Kenneth Koma | 3,742 | 57.09 | −11.65 |
| BDP | G. Matlhabaphiri | 2,517 | 38.40 | +7.66 |
| BCP | B. P. B. Bagwasi | 266 | 4.06 | N/A |
| BAM | L. Kuli | 30 | 0.46 | N/A |
| Margin of victory | | 1,225 | 18.69 | −19.31 |
| Total valid votes | | 6,555 | 97.72 | N/A |
| Rejected ballots | | 153 | 2.28 | N/A |
| Turnout | | 6,708 | 78.83 | +0.84 |
| Registered electors | | 8,509 | | |
| BNF hold | | Swing | −1.99 | |

=== 1994 election ===
General election 1994: Gaborone South
| Party | Candidate | Votes | % | ±% |
|---|---|---|---|---|
| BNF | Kenneth Koma | 4,318 | 68.74 | +10.67 |
| BDP | Abdul S. Dada | 1,931 | 30.74 | −11.19 |
| UDF | E. Abdulla | 33 | 0.53 | N/A |
| Margin of victory | | 2,387 | 38.00 | +21.86 |
| Turnout | | 6,282 | 77.99 | +5.80 |
| Registered electors | | 8,055 | | |
| BNF hold | | Swing | +10.93 | |

=== 1989 election ===
General election 1989: Gaborone South
| Party | Candidate | Votes | % | ±% |
|---|---|---|---|---|
| BNF | Kenneth Koma | 7,595 | 58.07 | +4.34 |
| BDP | Utlwang G.S. Matlhabaphiri | 5,483 | 41.93 | −3.44 |
| Margin of victory | | 2,112 | 16.14 | +7.78 |
| Turnout | | 13,078 | 72.19 | +4.33 |
| Registered electors | | 18,117 | | |
| BNF hold | | Swing | +3.89 | |

=== 1984 election (rerun) ===
General election 1984: Gaborone South (rerun)
| Party | Candidate | Votes | % |
|---|---|---|---|
| BNF | Kenneth Koma | 4,771 | 53.73 |
| BDP | Peter Mmusi | 4,029 | 45.37 |
| BPP | Victor Masole | 80 | 1.62 |
| Margin of victory | | 742 | 8.36 |
| Turnout | | 8,880 | 67.86 |
| Registered electors | | 13,086 | |
| BNF win (new seat) | | | |

=== 1984 election ===
General election 1984: Gaborone South (annulled)
| Party | Candidate | Votes | % |
|---|---|---|---|
| BDP | Peter Mmusi | 4,645 | 48.37 |
| BNF | Kenneth Koma | 4,523 | 47.09 |
| Independent | Wellie Seboni | 280 | 2.92 |
| BPP | Victor Masole | 156 | 1.62 |
| Margin of victory | | 122 | 1.28 |
| Turnout | | 9,604 | 73.39 |
| Registered electors | | 13,086 | |
