= 1984 Botswana general election =

- 8 September 1984

34 of the 38 seats in the National Assembly 18 seats needed for a majority
- Registered: 293,571
- Turnout: 77.58% (of registered voters) (▲22.34pp); 54.18% (of eligible population) (▲7.81pp) (Note: National Study On Voter Apathy in Botswana (PDF). University of Botswana. IEC Botswana. 2022. p. 17.)
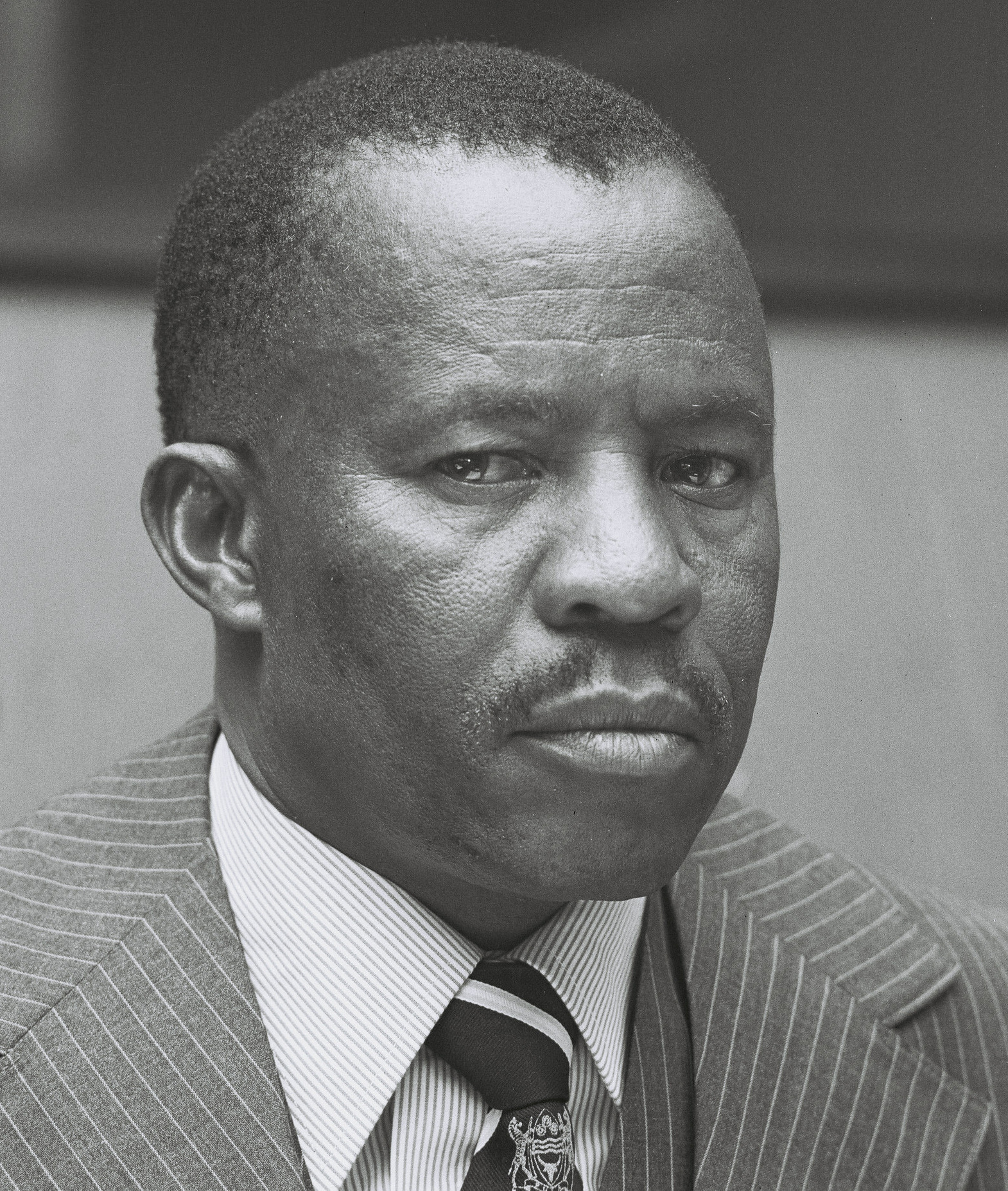

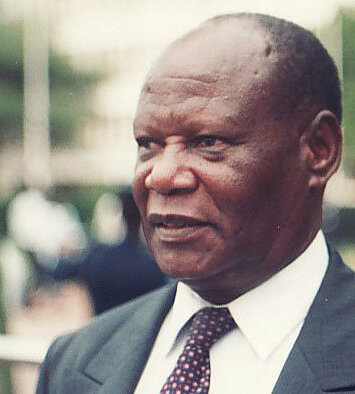
	Majority party	Minority party	Third party
			BPP
Leader	Quett Masire	Kenneth Koma	Knight Maripe
Party	BDP	BNF	BPP
Leader's seat	None (Note: Incumbent presidents are ineligible to contest National Assembly seats; instead, they serve as ex-officio members of Parliament.)	Gaborone South (Note: In the 8 September general election, Kenneth Koma lost to Peter Mmusi in the Gaborone South constituency. However, a court ruling annulled the election and ordered it to be repeated. Koma won the replay on 1 December.)	Sebina/Gweta
Last election	75.17%, 29 seats	13.00%, 2 seats	7.42%, 1 seat
Seats won	29	4	1
Seat change	Steady	▲2	Steady
Popular vote	154,863	46,550	14,961
Percentage	68.00%	20.44%	6.57%
Swing	▼7.17pp	▲7.44pp	▼0.85pp
- Results by constituency
President before election
Quett Masire
BDP
Elected President
Quett Masire
BDP

General elections were held in Botswana on 8 September 1984. Although the result was a fifth successive landslide victory for the Botswana Democratic Party, which won 29 of the 34 elected seats, the elections saw the opposition Botswana National Front make gains, winning both seats in the capital Gaborone, and take control of all urban councils except Selebi-Phikwe in the simultaneous local elections.

This was the last general election until 2004 in which any seats went uncontested.

== Background ==
Following the death of President Seretse Khama in 1980, the 1984 elections were the first contested with Quett Masire as leader of the BDP.

== Electoral system ==
The 34 elected members of the National Assembly were elected in single-member constituencies, an increase of two from the 1979 elections. Following the 1981 census, constituency boundaries were redrawn and Gaborone was split into two constituencies.

== Campaign ==
A total of 82 candidates contested the election as party representatives, with the BDP being the only party to contest all 34 seats. The Botswana National Front ran in 27 constituencies, the Botswana People's Party in 13, and the Botswana Independence Party and Botswana Progressive Union in four.

The campaign focussed on economic issues linked to the impact of drought and recession on the diamond industry.

== Results ==
Party	Votes	%	Seats	+/–
Botswana Democratic Party	154,863	68.00	29	0
Botswana National Front	46,550	20.44	4	+2
Botswana People's Party	14,961	6.57	1	0
Botswana Independence Party	7,288	3.20	0	0
Botswana Progressive Union	3,036	1.33	0	New
Independents	1,058	0.46	0	0
Indirectly-elected members			4	–
Total	227,756	100.00	38	+2
Registered voters/turnout	293,571	–		
Source: IPU, Nohlen et al.

== Aftermath ==
Following the elections, Botswana National Front co-leader Kenneth Koma went to court to have the result in the Gaborone South constituency overturned; Koma had lost to Vice-President Peter Mmusi, but an unopened ballot box was discovered after the final count. The High Court annulled the result and a by-election was held in December in which Koma defeated Mmusi.
