= Kenneth Koma =

Motswana intellectual and politician

The Honourable Kenneth Koma
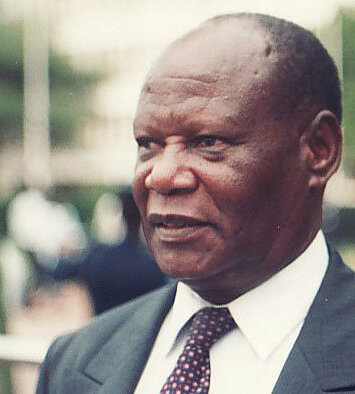

Leader of the Opposition
- President: Quett Masire; Festus Mogae
- In office 2 December 1984 – 1 August 2003
- Preceded by: Bathoen Gaseitsiwe
- Succeeded by: Nehemiah Modubule

President of the Botswana National Front
- In office 23 April 1977 – 25 November 2001
- Preceded by: Bathoen Gaseitsiwe
- Succeeded by: Otsweletse Moupo

Member of Parliament for Gaborone South
- In office 2 December 1984 – 17 October 2004
- Preceded by: Peter Mmusi
- Succeeded by: Akanyang Magama

Personal details
- Born: 27 July 1923 Mahalapye, Bechuanaland
- Died: 19 March 2007 (aged 83) Mahalapye, Botswana
- Party: Botswana National Front
- Education: University of Cape Town (BA); University of Nottingham (LLB); Charles University (MA); Academy of Sciences of the Soviet Union (PhD)

Gaobamong Kenneth Shololo Koma (27 July 1923 – 19 March 2007), popularly known as KK, was a Motswana intellectual and politician who served as president of the Botswana National Front (BNF), the country's main opposition party from 1977 to 2001. He also served as a member of the National Assembly of Botswana, representing the Gaborone South constituency from 1984 to 2004 and held the position of Leader of the Opposition from 1984 to 2003. Alongside Bathoen Gaseitsiwe and Philip Matante, he is considered one of the primary opposition leaders during the first three decades of the Botswana Democratic Party (BDP) government's existence.

Koma's early political involvement began in the 1950s when he supported Seretse Khama in the fight for the independence of the British protectorate of Bechuanaland. However, after independence, he distanced himself from Khama and became one of his harshest critics. In 1965, Koma played a pivotal role in founding the Botswana National Front with the backing of tribal leader Bathoen Gaseitsiwe. Koma identified as a "scientific socialist" and led a faction within the party that advocated for African socialism. Despite their ideological differences, he shared leadership with Bathoen, a traditionalist conservative, in an effort to create a political force tailored to the country's needs.

For the first twenty years post-independence, Koma faced repeated electoral setbacks, primarily due to Bathoen's interference aimed at sidelining his leadership. Nevertheless, he succeeded in being elected as the president of the BNF in 1977. However, Bathoen continued to politically isolate Koma. In 1984, Koma lost to Vice President Peter Mmusi of the BDP in the Gaborone South constituency amidst an electoral fraud scandal. Koma challenged the result in court and emerged victorious in the subsequent by-election. With Bathoen's retirement, Koma assumed the role of party chairman and became the Leader of the Opposition.

Koma's leadership oversaw significant growth in the opposition's electoral success in the dominant party system of Botswana. The BNF assumed control of most major urban centers in 1984 and solidified this in 1989, surpassing other political factions to establish itself as the sole party, apart from the BDP, with nationwide influence. Koma applied pressure to Quett Masire's government to enact reforms, enhancing the transparency of electoral management. Under his leadership, the BNF achieved its best-ever result in the 1994 election and to date remains the highest popular vote percentage achieved by any single opposition party in Botswana, securing 13 out of the 40 parliamentary seats.

In the subsequent period, Koma confronted a leadership conflict with a younger faction within the party, led by Michael Dingake, who attempted to unseat him in the late 1990s. Although their efforts failed, the resulting splinter party, known as the Botswana Congress Party, dealt a severe blow to the BNF during the 1999 election. Koma resigned as the BNF's leader after this defeat in mid-2000 and stepped down as the Leader of the Opposition in 2003. He retired from Parliament at the conclusion of his fourth term in 2004.

== Later life and death ==
During his final years, Koma left the BNF as his faction lost control of the party. He played a pivotal role in founding the New Democratic Front, but health issues compelled him to retire from the political arena. Koma died in March 2007 at the age of 83 and received a simple burial in his hometown of Mahalapye.

== Legacy ==
As a prominent political leader in pre- and post-independence Botswana, Koma's political legacy is extensive and controversial. His supporters defend his long-standing political militancy, his commitment to socialist principles, his efforts to promote greater democratization within the Botswana political system, and his role in driving the BNF's electoral gains during the decades from 1980 to 1990. However, his critics question his autocratic leadership within the party, particularly following Bathoen's departure in 1985, as well as his involvement in opposition divisions that dashed high hopes of an electoral victory in 1999. Despite these controversies, both the BNF and numerous splinter parties that emerged during his leadership regard Koma as an ideological and political reference.
