= Gweta =

Village in Botswana

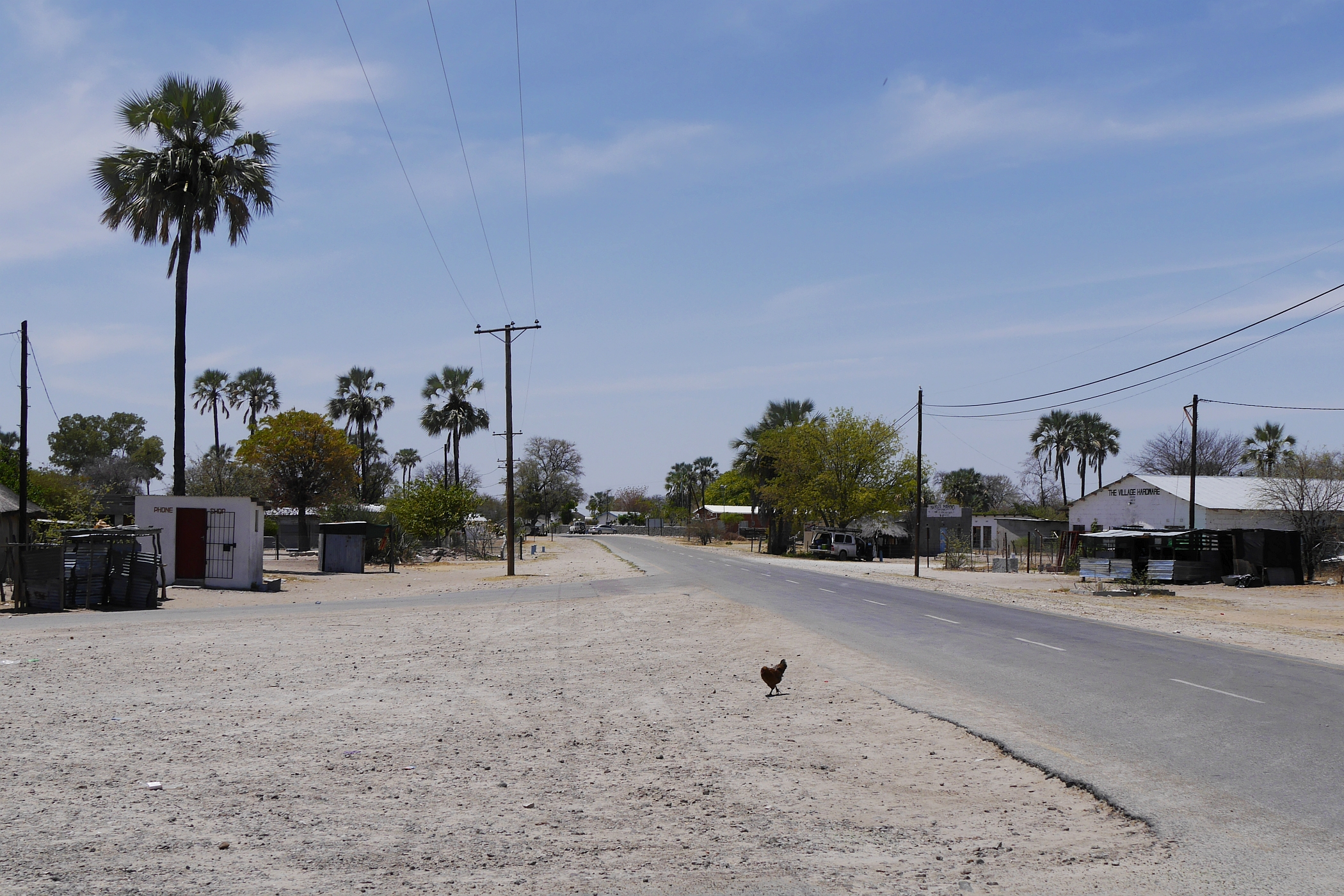
- Houses in Gweta

- Location of Gweta
- Coordinates: 20°10′59″S 25°13′59″E
- Country: Botswana
- Region: Central District

Population (2022)
  - Total: 5,448

Gweta is a small village in Botswana. It lies about 205 kilometres (127 mi) away from Maun and about 100 kilometres (62 mi) from Nata.

== Etymology ==
Generally considered the gateway to the Makgadikgadi Pans, Gweta derived its name from the sound of croaking bullfrogs which bury themselves in the sand until the rainy season arrives and they emerge to mate.

== Animals ==
The huge expanse of the Makgadikgadi Pans is bigger than Switzerland. Once a large river-fed lake, the Makgadikgadi Pans now lie saline and empty.

== Baobabs ==
In the area around Gweta are national monuments in the form of baobabs. Greens Baobab, 27 km south of Gweta was inscribed by the 19th-century hunters and traders Frederick Thomas Green and Hendrik Matthys van Zyl as well as other people.

About 11 km further south of Green's Baobab is the turn-off to the Chapman's Baobab, named after South African hunter James Chapman which has a circumference of 25m and was historically used as a navigation beacon. It was also used as an early post office by passing explorers, traders and travellers, many of whom left inscriptions on its trunk. On the 7th of January 2016, Chapman's Baobab fell. It is not as yet clear what caused Chapman's to fall, or whether the tree is still alive.

== See also ==
- Mathangwane Village
