= Tonota =

Village located in the Central District of Botswana

Coordinates: 21°29′S 27°29′E

Tonota is a village located in the Central District of Botswana.

The people in Tonota are said to be Bakhurutshe who fought against some other tribes they found there and after winning the war, they owned the land and they became 'Ba bina kgama le phofu'. The name Tonota is said to be spelled THONOTHA (pronounced DONOTHA) in natural Sekhurutshe but was changed to Tonota due to the influence of the Tswana Languages. The village is located 27 kilometers south of the City of Francistown along the A1 (Francistown-Gaborone) road. It lies along the Southwest bank of Shashe River, which happens to the border between the Central and North East Districts, so Tonota is considered to be in the Central District. Tonota is a large territory divided into small segments, namely: Tonota Village in the South, Semotswane, Mandunyane, and Shashe Bridge to the north. The chief of the Tonota village is Kgosi Bokamoso Radipitse who took over the chieftainship from his father, Ramosinyi Radipitse who retired from the chieftaincy throne in 2016 due to old age.

It was promoted to sub-district from under Tutume in 2003. There are 10 primary schools in Tonota:

- Madisakwana Memorial School
- Moutlwatsi Memorial school
- Rauwe Memorial school
- Tonota Primary school
- Kgosi Sekoko Memorial school
- John Phooko Memorial Primary school
- Tholodi Primary school
- Semotswane Primary school
- Mandunyane Primary School
- Masedi Primary school

There are also 3 junior secondary schools:

- Letlhabile Junior School
- Rutwang Junior School
- Tonota Junior School

And a senior school which is Shashe River School. There is also a college (Tonota College of Education(TCE)).

The current member of parliament for Tonota is Hon. Gaefele Sedombo.

Other great politicians and leaders to have come out of this expansive village include former cabinet ministers and MPs like: Mr Lemme Makgekgenene, Mr Patrick Balopi, former Deputy Speaker of the National Assembly and MP, Mr Pono P. Moatlhodi and the former minister of Finance and Development Planning, Kenneth Mathambo, Michael Mzwinila, among others.

The first people settled between 1912 and 1914 from Selepeng/Leshongwane in the north east part of the country. They were led by Kgosi Rauwe Sekoko who originated from Lehurutshe in Dinokaneng in South Africa.

Before settling in the north east it is understood that Bahurutshe first settled with Bangwato in the old Palapye and when Bangwato relocated to Serowe, they herded for the north east.

From the north east they were joined by some Bakalanga as they permanently settled in Tonota. The name of the tribe is originally Mohurutshe and Mokhurutshe was derived from the Kalanga name Ndikhurutshe.

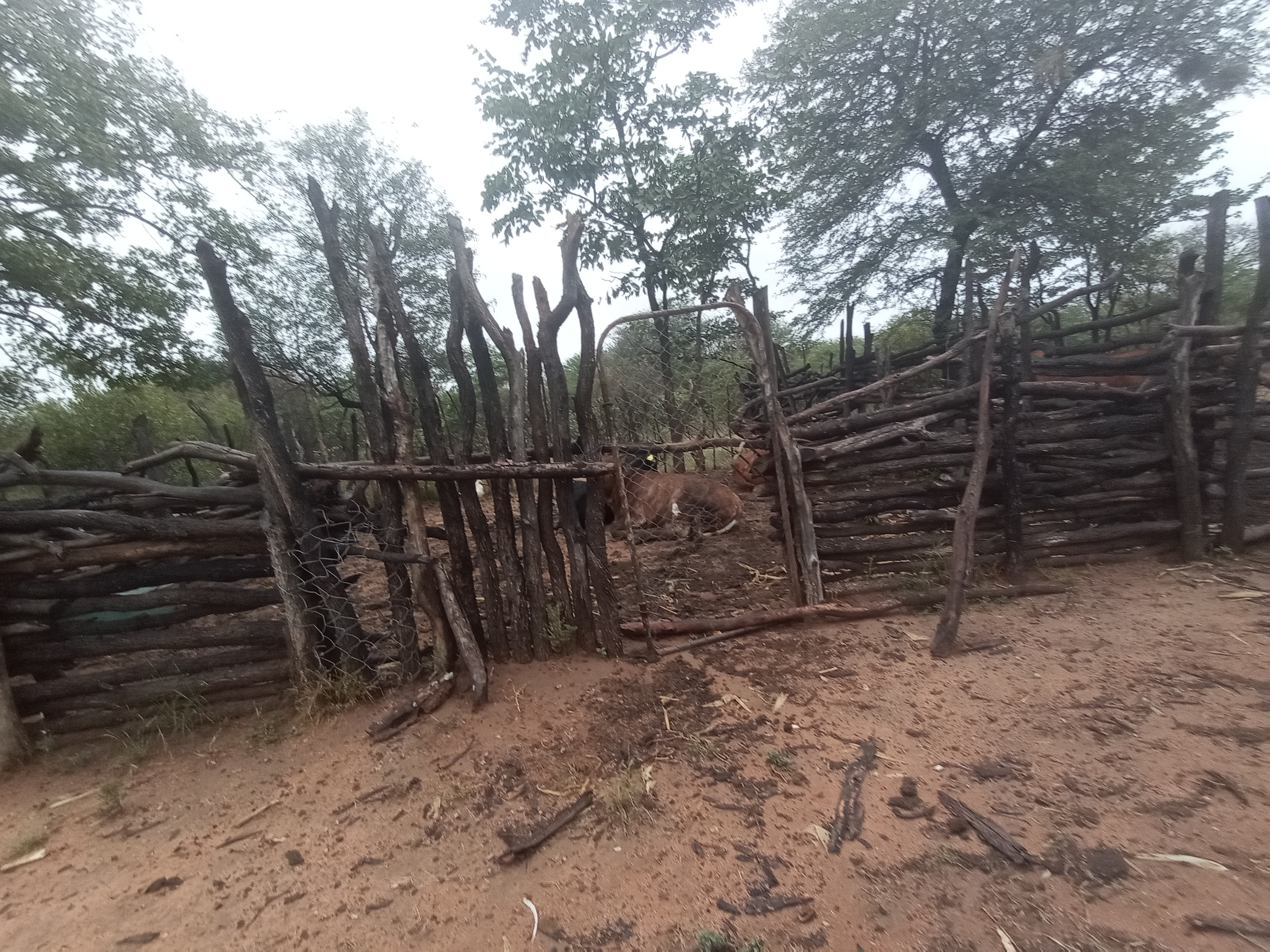
Cattle rearing

Tonota like many other villages in Botswana, has many tribes living in it but the majority are Bakhurutshe who occupy the Tholo, Molebatsi, Maaloso, Maunya, Madisakwana and Mhakamme wards, and Bakalanga who live in the Manyanda ward. There are also Barotsi in Leomboko ward and BaShona(Zezuru) in Mandunyane. Most of the people from Tonota speak Sekhurutshe-SeNgwato (a language which is merely an inclusion of Kalanga-like words in SeNgwato) and Kalanga.

The economy of the village is mainly dependent on cattle rearing, horticulture and rain fed agriculture. There is a good number of people who work in both the government and the private sector.

Tonota village recently (5 - 7 September 2014) celebrated 100 years of existence amidst splendor and sharing of historical thoughts by the few who could still remember the long history of Bakhurutshe since 1914.

Tonota is not only known as the land of ‘Manyonyomane’ (fat-cakes) but it is also home to Mr Kebatlamang Morake, who was the first cabinet minister to act as President of Botswana.

Also to take note of; is the Soccer team which originate from Tonota by the name Tonota Football Club a.k.a. Sepondo Sea Debola. The team is in the First Division under the Botswana Football Association; and the Manager of the team is Mr. Maokaneng Bontshetse.

== See also ==
- Nata River
