= 1994 Botswana general election =

- 15 October 1994

40 of the 44 seats in the National Assembly 21 seats needed for a majority
- Registered: 370,169
- Turnout: 76.55% (of registered voters) (▲8.31pp); 44.63% (of eligible population) (▼3.27pp) (Note: National Study On Voter Apathy in Botswana (PDF). University of Botswana. IEC Botswana. 2022. p. 17.)
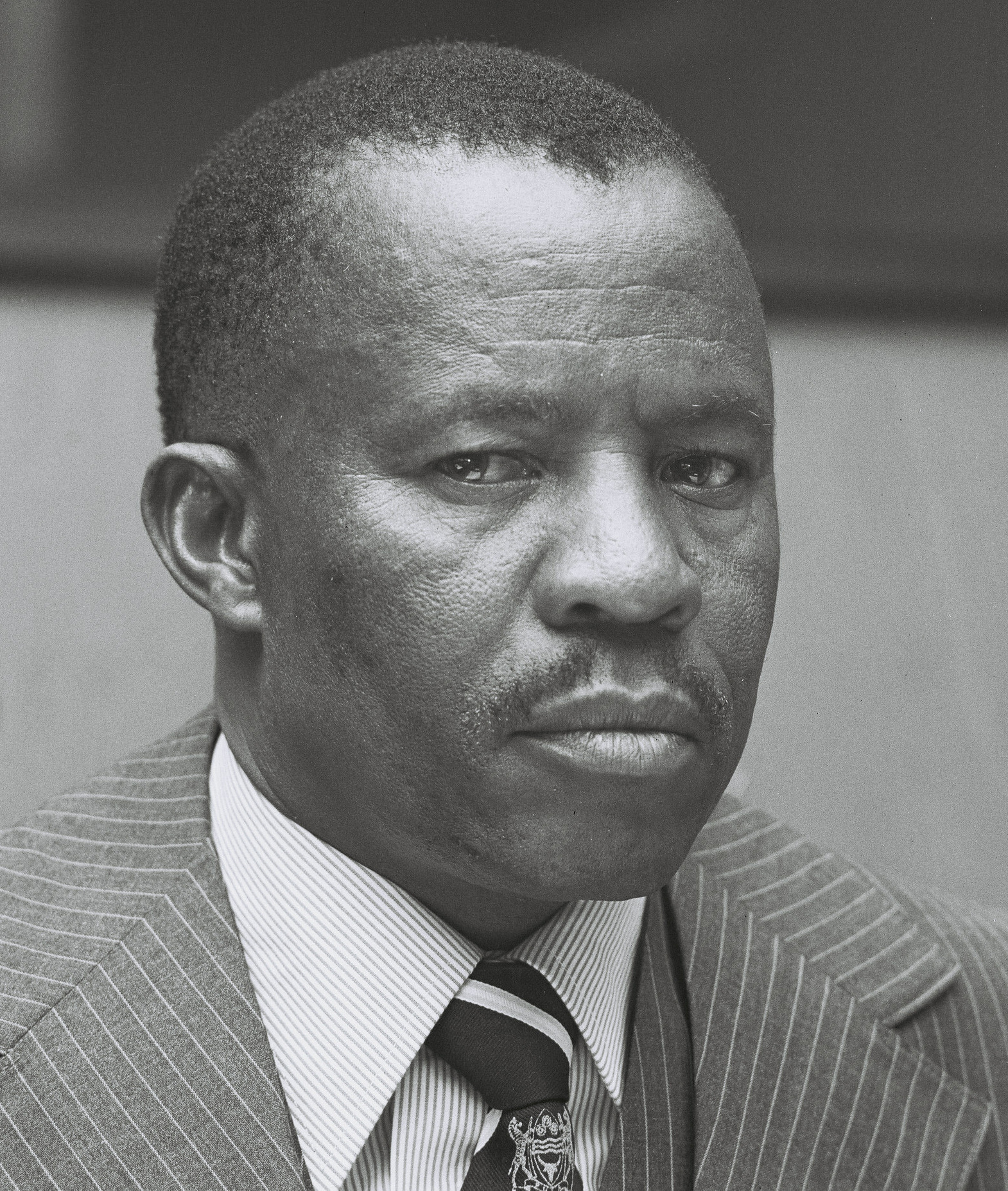

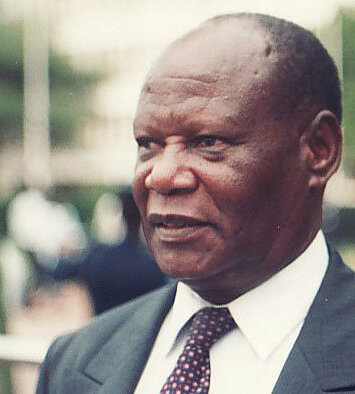
	Majority party	Minority party
Leader	Quett Masire	Kenneth Koma
Party	BDP	BNF
Leader's seat	None (Note: Incumbent presidents are ineligible to contest National Assembly seats; instead, they serve as ex-officio members of Parliament.)	Gaborone South
Last election	64.78%, 31 seats	26.95%, 3 seats
Seats won	27 (Note: Includes Thamaga results (3,674 BDP vs 2,238 BNF), as election was postponed with the death of the BDP candidate.)	13
Seat change	▼4	▲10
Popular vote	154,705	105,109
Percentage	54.59%	37.09%
Swing	▼10.19pp	▲10.14pp
- Results by constituency
President before election
Quett Masire
BDP
Elected President
Quett Masire
BDP

General elections were held in Botswana on 15 October 1994, alongside simultaneous local elections. The result was a victory for the Botswana Democratic Party (BDP), which had won every election since 1965. However, the elections also saw a strong performance from the Botswana National Front (BNF), which tripled its number of MPs and won all four seats in the capital Gaborone.

== Background ==
Following the 1991 census, constituency boundaries were redrawn and six new constituencies were created. Five of these were in urban areas, which was deemed to be a more realistic apportionment of constituencies; Gaborone gained three, Francistown one and Lobatse became a new constituency.

== Campaign ==
The elections were contested by a record nine parties, with a total of 108 candidates running. The BNF considered boycotting the elections after the government refused to reform the electoral system or reduce the voting age from 21, but eventually contested the elections due to the belief that the government was vulnerable.

The BDP campaigned on its record of economic and political stability, whilst the BNF campaign centred on high rent and utility costs, as well as unemployment.

== Results ==
Party	Votes	%	Seats	+/–
Botswana Democratic Party	154,705	54.59	27	–4
Botswana National Front	105,109	37.09	13	+10
Botswana People's Party	11,586	4.09	0	0
Independence Freedom Party	7,653	2.70	0	New
Botswana Progressive Union	3,016	1.06	0	0
United Democratic Front	783	0.28	0	New
United Socialist Party	265	0.09	0	New
Lesedi la Botswana	235	0.08	0	New
Botswana Liberal Party	23	0.01	0	0
Indirectly-elected members			4	0
Total	283,375	100.00	44	+6
Registered voters/turnout	370,169	–		
Source: Parliament of Botswana

The four indirectly elected members were elected on 26 October by members of the National Assembly, based on a list of eight candidates produced by President Ketumile Masire.

== Aftermath ==
Following the elections, the National Assembly convened on 17 October to elect the President. Incumbent President Masire (BDP) was challenged by Kenneth Koma (BNF) and Knight Maripe (BPP). Masire was re-elected and inaugurated on 19 October. The new government was announced on 25 October.

The 13 opposition MPs were the most the BDP had faced since independence. It would be the BNF's best showing until the 2024 elections, when the BNF-led Umbrella for Democratic Change would defeat the BDP.
