= New Democratic Front (Botswana) =

Political party in Botswana

- Leader: Dick Bayford
- Founded: 2003
- Dissolved: 2004
- Split from: Botswana National Front
- Merged into: Botswana Congress Party
- Ideology: Progressivism

The New Democratic Front was a progressive political party in Botswana without parliamentary representation. Led by Dick Bayford, it split away from the Botswana National Front in 2003. It won 0.78% of the popular votes at the elections that followed. After its poor performance in the 2004 general elections, the party joined forces with Botswana's third largest party, the Botswana Congress Party.
