= Nkange =

- Village
- Location within Botswana
- Coordinates: 20°17′56″S 27°08′08″E
- Country: Botswana
- District: Central District

Population (2011)
  - Total: 3,550
- Time zone: GMT +2
- Climate: BSh

Nkange is a village located in the Central District of Botswana. It had 3,550 inhabitants at the 2011 census.

== See also ==
- List of cities in Botswana
