= Daniel Kwelagobe =

Botswanan politician

His Honour Daniel Keatametse Kwelagobe
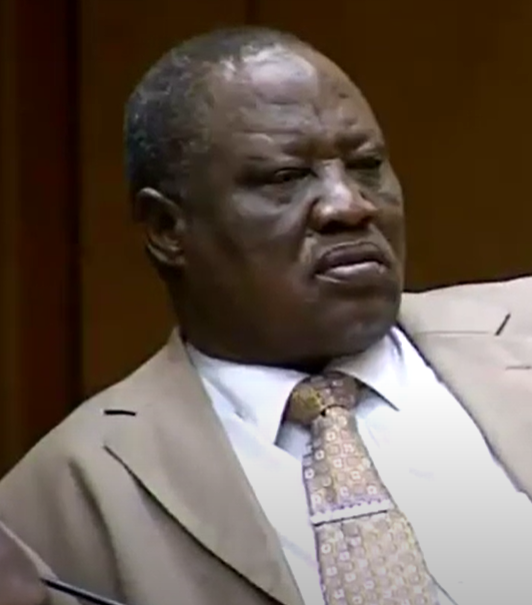
- President: Mokgweetsi Masisi

Minister for Presidential Affairs
- President: Quett Masire; Festus Mogae; Ian Khama; Mokgweetsi Masisi

Chairman of the Botswana Democratic Party
- President: Ian Khama

Personal details
- Born: Daniel Keatametse Kwelagobe; 1 September 1943 (age 82)
- Party: Botswana Democratic Party

Daniel Keatametse Kwelagobe (born September 1, 1943) is a Motswana former politician, who was the Chairman of the Botswana Democratic Party and the longest serving Secretary General of the Botswana Democratic Party, having held the position from 1980 until 2007. He is the only cabinet minister to have served under the first four President of Botswana. Kwelagobe holds the record for the youngest Member of Parliament to be elected to parliament, having achieved that feat in 1969 when he was elected MP for Molepolole aged 26 years. He is also the longest serving MP, with 45 years of service in the National Assembly of Botswana.

Kwelagobe previously served as Minister for Presidential Affairs on two occasions. He attended Gaborone Secondary School, and from 1968 followed a career in radio and journalism before beginning his political career when joining the Party and becoming the Minister of Commerce and Industry, Minister of State for Public Service, Information and Broadcasting, as well as serving as the minister for transport, communications, agriculture and housing in his career.

Kwelagobe was the Deputy Secretary General of the Party until becoming the General Secretary in 1980, and was the Minister of Labour and Home Affairs from 2000 until 2002. He also served as the Minister of Presidential Affairs and Public Administration until President Ian Khama dismissed him in April 2009.
