= Botswana Democratic Party =

- Abbreviation: BDP
- President: Mpho Balopi
- Chairman: Karabo Gare
- Founder: Seretse Khama
- Founded: 28 February 1962; 64 years ago
- Headquarters: Tsholetsa House, Luthuli Road, Gaborone
- Youth wing: BDP Youth Wing
- Ideology: Paternalistic conservatism Economic nationalism
- Political position: Centre to centre-right
- International affiliation: Socialist International (consultative)
- African affiliation: FLMSA
- Colors: Red; Black; White
- Slogan: Tsholetsa Domkrag
- National Assembly: 4 / 61
- Councillors: 129 / 609

Party flag

Website
- bdp.org.bw

The Botswana Democratic Party (abbr. BDP, colloquially known as Domkrag) is a centre-right political party in Botswana. From the country's inaugural election in 1965 until the 2024 general election, the party governed the country without interruption for 58 years. At the time of its defeat, the BDP was the longest continuous ruling party in the democratic world. (Note: The People's Action Party, Singapore's ruling party, has governed the country since independence in 1965, maintaining continuous rule for a longer period than the BDP as of the time of the 2024 Botswana general election. However, Singapore's democratic credentials are highly dubious, as noted by numerous academic sources. The V-Dem Democracy Indices classify Singapore as an electoral autocracy, stating that the country has never met the minimum conditions required to be considered even an electoral democracy throughout its post-independence history. Freedom House categorizes Singapore as "partly free," assigning it a political rights score of 19/40, compared to Botswana's 28/40, the latter being classified as "free" at the time of the 2024 Botswana general election.)

The party was founded in February 1962 as the Bechuanaland Democratic Party while the country was a British protectorate. It adopted its current name following Botswana's independence in 1966. In its beginnings, it was led by Seretse Khama, the country's first president and his successor Quett Masire. Subsequent presidents of Botswana, Festus Mogae, Ian Khama and Mokgweetsi Masisi, have chaired the party. The party won an overwhelming majority in the first elections under universal suffrage in 1965, leading Khama to become the first president of the new state, a position he held until his death in 1980. The BDP enjoyed virtually unquestioned hegemony for the next three decades, benefiting from the relative success of its economic policy and its pragmatic management of the relations between the different tribal groups of the country. Beginning in the late 1980s, the country's increasing urbanization and the emergence of a middle class less influenced by tribal relations weakened the BDP's support base and strengthened its opponents, while a growing economic slowdown in the 1990s caused the party to suffer harsh electoral setbacks; this led it to implement numerous reforms in an attempt to avoid exacerbating political polarization in the country. In subsequent elections, the BDP retained power with less support, largely benefiting from the first-past-the-post voting and facing an opposition plagued by constant divisions.

Although its sources of voters have varied over the years and itself has suffered some splits that gave rise to other opposition parties, such as the liberal Botswana Movement for Democracy (BMD) and the populist Botswana Patriotic Front (BPF), the BDP did not see its hegemony seriously threatened for much of its rule and won every election held since the introduction of universal suffrage in 1965 until 2024. Under its long government, elections in Botswana were considered credible and transparent by the international community.

From independence until the late 2010s, the BDP was particularly strong in the Central District, Seretse Khama's home region and the territory of the Ngwato tribe, while it became weak in urban areas, the North-West and the South. During the presidency of Ian Khama (2008–2018), a polarizing figure within the party itself, the BDP suffered considerable internal crises that led to the formation of the BMD in 2010. The presidency of Mokgweetsi Masisi saw the beginning of a change in Botswana's political landscape, with the departure of Ian Khama from the BDP and the subsequent formation of the pro-Khama Botswana Patriotic Front, which quickly established a sizeable base in the Central District. This led the BDP to lose its traditional dominance in the region and for the first time in history, the opposition managed to win seats there. At the same time, the BDP experienced an unprecedented resurgence in urban areas—largely hostile to Khama—which enabled the party to secure victories in the south and major cities during the 2019 elections. This allowed the BDP to offset its losses in the Central District, ultimately gaining a net seat and retaining its parliamentary majority.

Having been a party of power for nearly six decades, the BDP's ideology is considered by political analysts to be a party with an amorphous character, although in essence, it can be seen as a paternalistic conservative party that defends positions linked to traditionalism, economic nationalism, the market economy, the welfare state and multiparty liberal democracy. The party's historical voter base has been tribal communities, which has, in turn, led the BDP to mirror their conservative views. The internal democratization of the party since 1998 has since increased its ideological breadth.

== History ==
=== Founding years ===
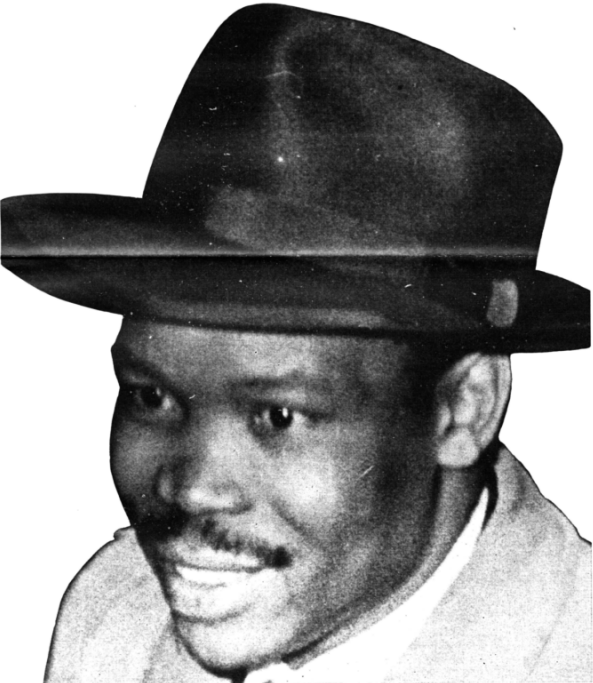
Seretse Khama, founder of the BDP and first president of Botswana.

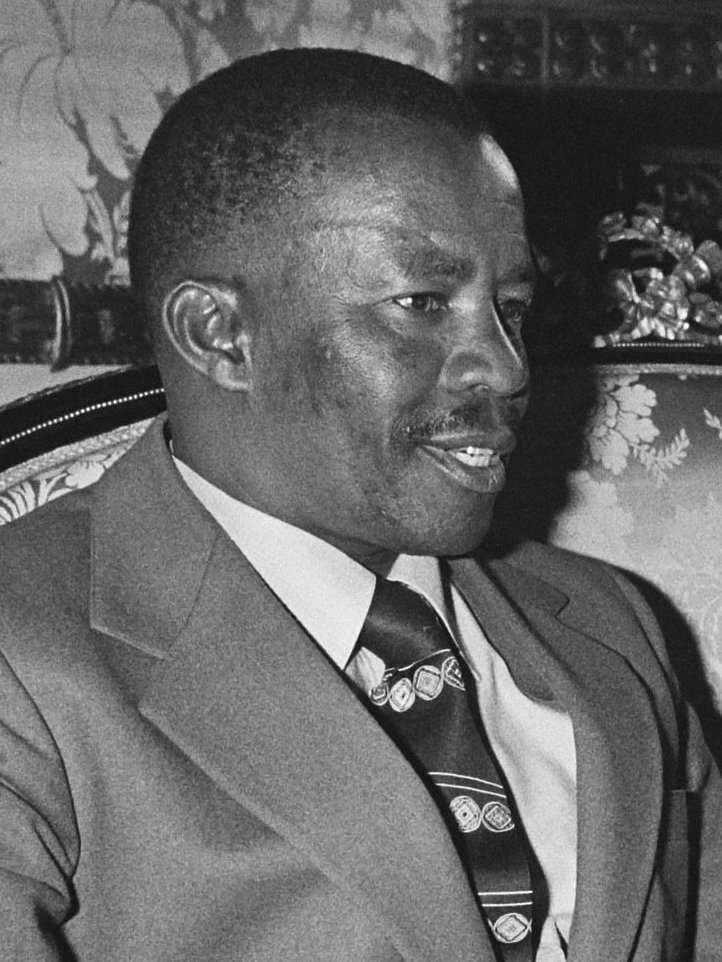
Quett Masire, second president of Botswana and leader of the BDP from 1980 to 1998.

The BDP was the third political party founded in the British protectorate of Bechuanaland, present-day Botswana. In this region, political development was much more gradual and slow, yet also more peaceful than in other neighboring African countries. An expansion of British central authority and the evolution of tribal government resulted in the establishment of two consultative councils in 1920 to represent Africans and Europeans. The African Council comprised the eight chiefs of the Tswana tribes and some elected members. A European-African Advisory Council formed in 1951 and the colonial constitution of 1961 marked the establishment of a consultative Legislative Council. By 1960, the party system in the region was still very basic, with only the Federal Party existing, mostly oriented towards the small educated population, aiming to achieve independence from the protectorate through peaceful discussion and the African nationalist and socialist-based Bechuanaland People's Party (BPP). The BPP was the first mass party in the country and the first to demand total independence from the colony. However, by the mid-1960s, a series of internal struggles and conflicts between the country's different ethnic groups had affected its political strength.

After a series of meetings, the "Bechuanaland Democratic Party" was established in November 1961 in Lobatse by a group of members of the African Consultative Council, a limited representative body of the protectorate, under the leadership of Seretse Khama, former head of the BaNgwato tribe, with Ketumile Quett Masire as general secretary. The party held its first constitutive congress on 28 February 1962 and began organizing to establish a presence throughout the protectorate's territory. Masire also started publishing the party newspaper, Therisanyo (lit. 'consultation'), in 1963, drawing from his past journalistic experiences.

In everyday language, the term "Domkrag" became more commonly used to refer to the BDP and its supporters. The name originated during the founding stage due to elders' difficulty in pronouncing the word "Democratic" in English. They used the word "Domkrag," which is Afrikaans for a jack used to lift heavy objects off the ground. This led the BDP to adopt the jack as its party symbol, symbolically equating it with its role in "lifting Botswana" from one of the poorest countries in the world to one of the fastest-growing economies. Since in Afrikaans, "dom krag" can be translated as "stupid power" or "power of the stupid," opponents used the term derogatorily to refer to the BDP. However, the word was reappropriated by the party itself and today, the word "domkrag" is synonymous with the BDP.

The first political test for the BDP was the general election of 1965, the first election under universal suffrage in the history of the country. The BDP benefited from extensive control over the central territory of the country guaranteed by Khama's prestige as chief of the Ngwato tribe, as well as the growing internal conflicts faced by the BPP, which was mired in inter-ethnic struggles that encouraged the formation of a new party, the Botswana Independence Party (BIP). Khama and Masire focused their speeches on the defense of liberal democracy, a negotiated transition to independence and an economic development plan for the heavily neglected and impoverished colony. The BDP's discourse was seen as much more moderate compared to its African socialist opponents who had a more aggressive rhetoric, which several voters perceived as unrealistic.

The elections took place on the 1st of March and the BDP won an overwhelming victory with 80% of the popular vote and an absolute majority of 28 out of 31 seats, against 14% of the popular vote and just 3 seats for the BPP. Two days later, Khama was sworn in as Prime Minister, becoming the first democratically elected head of government in Bechuanaland. The general elections were followed by local elections on 12 June 1966, just months before the end of the protectorate. The BDP also emerged victorious with 62% of the votes and secured 122 out of 141 members in the local government councils.

=== Post-independence years (1966–1994) ===
Bechuanaland gained independence as the Republic of Botswana on 30 September 1966. Following transitional agreements between the authorities elected in 1965 and the UK government at the time, Khama assumed the role of President of Botswana, with Masire serving as vice-president and the legislative council transformed into the National Assembly. On the same day, the BDP changed its name to the Botswana Democratic Party.

In contrast to other African leaders of the time, Khama did not seek the establishment of a one-party state with the BDP as the sole legal party. Instead, he preferred to uphold the rule of law and maintain the presence of a "responsible opposition" in Parliament. Likewise, calls to immediately "indigenize" the bureaucracy, which had caused devastating effects on the public service in neighboring countries, were resisted. The government retained foreign expatriates working in the country until suitably qualified local replacements could be found. However, the following decades would be characterized by the overarching hegemony of the BDP. This was explained by the inability of its opponents to unite, being strongly influenced by tribal interests or advocating ideas based on African socialism that the conservative local population found too radical or unattractive. Nevertheless, tribal relations had a significant influence on the BDP, which was virtually the only party with a presence in the Central District (the territory of the Ngwato tribe) for decades. This dominance would continue until the 2019 Botswana general election in which Seretse Khama's son, Ian, would break ranks with the BDP and thereby ending its five-decade stranglehold over the region.

At the time of its independence, Botswana was one of the world's poorest countries, even ranking below several African states. It possessed only 12 kilometers of paved road, 22 university graduates and 100 individuals with completed secondary education. The first years after independence were marked by the rapid development of a national infrastructure. The BDP aimed to implement an economic program that would transform Botswana into a country relying on exports of beef, copper and diamonds. In 1967, the discovery of the Orapa diamond deposits helped make this program viable. However, many social improvements were not visible to the majority of the population until the early 1970s. Simultaneously, the early years witnessed the strengthening of the authority of the Botswana central government over traditional tribal leadership, leading to some resentment among tribal leaders outside the BaNgwato. In this context, Bathoen Gaseitsiwe, chief of the Bangwaketse tribe, denounced the loss of tribal power and resigned his position to engage in politics. He joined the nascent Botswana National Front, led by socialist leader Kenneth Koma. In the context of profound apathy and conflicts with tribal leaders, the BDP suffered a significant loss of votes in the 1969 general elections. Nevertheless, it managed to secure a new two-thirds majority against the BNF, the BPP and the BIP, but electoral participation dropped significantly. With 68.21% of the vote and 24 of 31 seats elected, it would be the party's smallest victory under Khama's leadership. Indeed, the seven opposition MPs elected that year would be the most opposition the BDP would face in the first quarter-century of independence.

The BDP dedicated its second term in power (1969–1974) to implementing policies that benefited the rural sector. This included the construction of extensive infrastructure in remote regions, leading to a rapid surge in popular support for the party, even though the majority of the population remained politically apathetic. The 1974 Botswana general election demonstrated this support. The BDP secured the highest popular vote in its history with 77%. At the local level, it obtained a majority in all councils except the North-East District, where the BPP emerged victorious. However, voter turnout was the lowest in Botswana's electoral history, with only 31% of registered voters casting their ballots. Concerned about the possibility that high abstention could challenge its legitimacy, the BDP launched a broad media campaign in the second half of the 1970s to engage the population, encouraging voter registration and participation. The 1979 election saw the BDP achieve another landslide victory, securing 75% of the vote and 29 of the 32 seats. Although the BDP managed to take the Francistown seat from the BPP, there was a slight drop in Gaborone, where BNF leader Koma received just over 40% of the vote. Khama was re-elected for a fourth term but died a few months later on 13 July 1980, and was succeeded by vice-president Quett Masire.

Initially viewed as an "acting president," Masire, a native of the Bangwaketse region, spent his initial years in power consolidating his position within the party. He made some strategic moves to distance the BDP from the Ngwato elite and maintain dominance in other regions of the country. To achieve this, he appointed Peter Mmusi, MP for Gaborone, as vice-president. However, the 1984 general election signaled a change in the country's political landscape following Khama's death. Under Koma's leadership, the BNF achieved a series of municipal victories and became the most voted force in the capital. Months later, an electoral fraud scandal, known as "Botswana Watergate," led to a re-election in Gaborone South in which Koma defeated vice-president Mmusi and assumed the role of Leader of the Opposition. The subsequent mandate was marked by economic difficulties, including an economic recession that adversely affected the diamond industry, a persistent drought and a resulting famine. The government had to address these challenges through aggressive food aid policies. The BDP government also faced increasing pressure from Apartheid South Africa, which resulted in the military intervention of the South African Defence Force in Gaborone in June 1985, directed against members of the ANC stationed in the country due to the passivity of the Botswana armed forces.

The second half of the 1980s witnessed a significant decline in electoral support for the BDP as Botswana's population underwent urbanization, foreshadowing the considerable decline it would experience in the following decade. However, during the first fourteen years after Khama's death, this decline was not accompanied by a loss of parliamentary power. The 1989 general election saw the BDP obtain 65% of the popular vote, marking the first time in its history that it failed to secure more than two-thirds of the popular vote. Nonetheless, the party still managed to secure 31 of the 34 parliamentary seats. Benefiting from Bathoen's departure from the BNF and the division of votes with the new BFP, the BDP managed to penetrate its old support base in the Bangwaketse tribe, winning the Ngwaketse South seat from the opposition. These elections revealed the significant overrepresentation of rural areas compared to urban areas. Although it marked the lowest popular vote achieved by the BDP in its history up to that point, the party secured its best historical result in parliamentary terms, controlling 91% of the seats in the National Assembly. Despite the BNF increasing its percentage of votes by almost 7%, it only obtained three seats, losing one of the four achieved in 1984.

=== Declining popularity and reform (1994–2008) ===
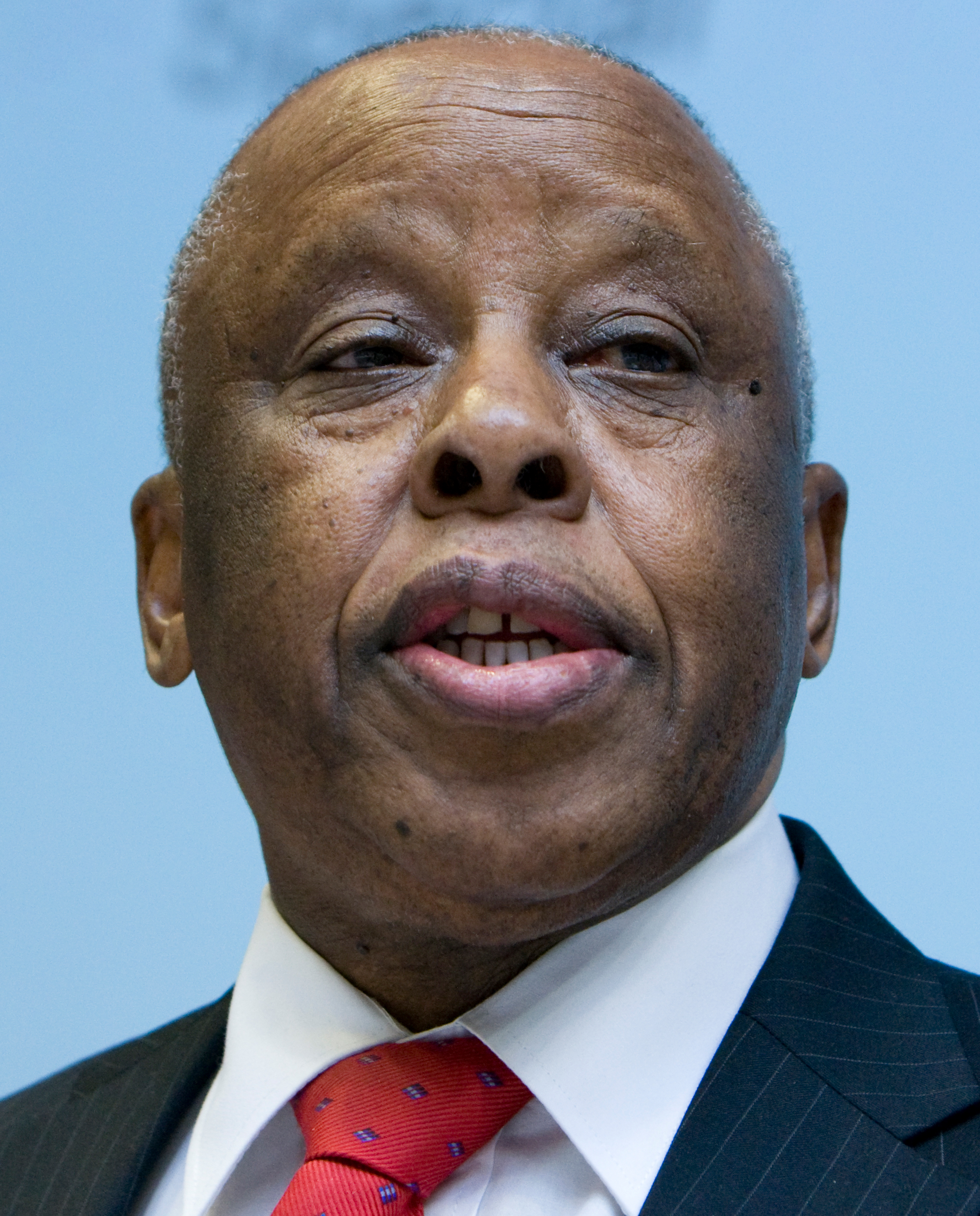
Festus Mogae led the party from 1998 to 2008, following a series of sweeping reforms within the BDP.

The 1990s marked the end of the economic boom in Botswana that had characterized the previous three decades. Between 1989 and 1993, Botswana transitioned from a GDP growth rate exceeding 13% to experiencing negative growth for the first time in its independent history. Unemployment and poverty increased as a consequence of reduced demand for diamonds, copper and nickel, driven by the global recession. The country continued to experience growing urbanization, creating an urban class less influenced by tribal divisions and a more vocal, politicized population. Informal settlements began to emerge in urban areas like Gaborone, Francistown, Selebi-Phikwe and Lobatse.

These rapid demographic changes, combined with the worsening economic and social situation, eroded popular support for the BDP. Within the party, which had been previously unified and disciplined, factionalism and internal conflicts began to surface, setting the tone for the party's future.

While President Masire's leadership remained unquestioned, internal clashes between factions within the cabinet became commonplace. Despite Botswana's reputation for comparatively low corruption in sub-Saharan Africa, the first half of the decade was marred by scandals. One of the most notable scandals involved the irregular sale of land which led to the resignations of Vice-president Peter Mmusi and the then Minister of Agriculture, Daniel Kwelagobe, both high-ranking officials in the former ruling party.

The 1994 Botswana general election took place against a backdrop of economic complexity and increasing demands for transparency in electoral administration by the opposition. The BDP suffered a significant decline and only won 26 of the 39 contested seats. The BNF made gains by capitalizing on urban discontent and even penetrated the party's rural base for the first time, achieving important advances in local elections. It was the first time that the BDP faced more than seven opposition MPs.

After the elections, the political climate in Botswana deteriorated. The supplementary election in the Thamaga parliamentary constituency, delayed due to the sudden death of Mmusi (a candidate in that constituency), highlighted the internal crisis of the BDP. Factionalism increased as the central leadership imposed Gladys Kokorwe's candidacy despite the local congress overwhelmingly electing Kabo Morwaeng. Younger sectors of the BDP began demanding greater internal democracy in the party. Nonetheless, the BDP retained the seat. In January 1995, a series of demonstrations in Mochudi and Gaborone culminated in a student protest in front of the Parliament building, which was met with severe police repression, regarded as one of the most serious cases of police brutality in the country's history. This event prompted Masire's government to accede to some of the opposition's reformist demands, leading to the first bipartisan negotiations in post-independence Botswana. The reforms implemented included the creation of the Independent Electoral Commission (IEC), lowering the voting age from 21 to 18, allowing voting abroad and setting a ten-year limit (equivalent to two terms) on the presidency.

The BDP also adopted a series of internal reforms, including a primary election system known as "buleladitswe", (lit. ''set them free'') which brought a profound change in the party's internal management. Despite these changes, the constitutional limit was not retroactive. Masire resigned as president and leader of the BDP on 31 March 1998, handing power to vice-president Festus Mogae, while the vice presidency was laid in the hands of Seretse Khama's son, Ian Khama. The BDP adopted an internal reform that implemented the same limit for party leadership, setting the leadership change to occur a year and a half before the regular general elections, giving the incumbent president a prolonged interim period to reinforce their public image and avoid the wear and tear of the outgoing administration. Mogae's presidency focused on addressing poverty, unemployment and the spread of HIV/AIDS, which affected a significant portion of Botswana's population.

In the same year, the BDP's fortunes improved as the BNF faced internal conflicts between Kenneth Koma and a dissident faction led by Michael Dingake, which led to the founding of the Botswana Congress Party (BCP). The BDP achieved a landslide victory in the 1999 elections, winning 33 of the 40 elected seats and securing 57% of the popular vote.

The economic situation improved in the following years, stabilizing popular support for the BDP. The government maintained an international reputation for adhering to the rule of law. However, factionalism plagued the BDP throughout the 2000s, raising concerns that the party might split. The Barata-Phathi (lit. ''Lovers of the Party'') faction, led by Ponatshego Kedikilwe and former party secretary-general Daniel Kwelagobe, contended with the dominant faction, Team A, led by President Mogae, vice-president Khama and cabinet ministers Jacob Nkate and Mompati Merafhe.

Despite these challenges, Mogae's leadership managed to maintain unity during the 2004 elections, where the BDP reaffirmed its majority with 44 of the 57 contested seats. Its popular vote was the lowest in its history at that time (at 52%). The campaign popularized the BDP slogan "There is Still No Alternative" to emphasize the inability of other parties to take power and govern the country. The transition of party leadership began, with Khama becoming increasingly active in politics before succeeding Mogae as president on 20 March 2008. French president Nicolas Sarkozy awarded Mogae the Grand Cross of the Legion of Honor for his "exemplary leadership" in making Botswana a "model" of democracy and good governance and he also received the Ibrahim Prize that same year.

=== Ian Khama era (2008–2018) ===
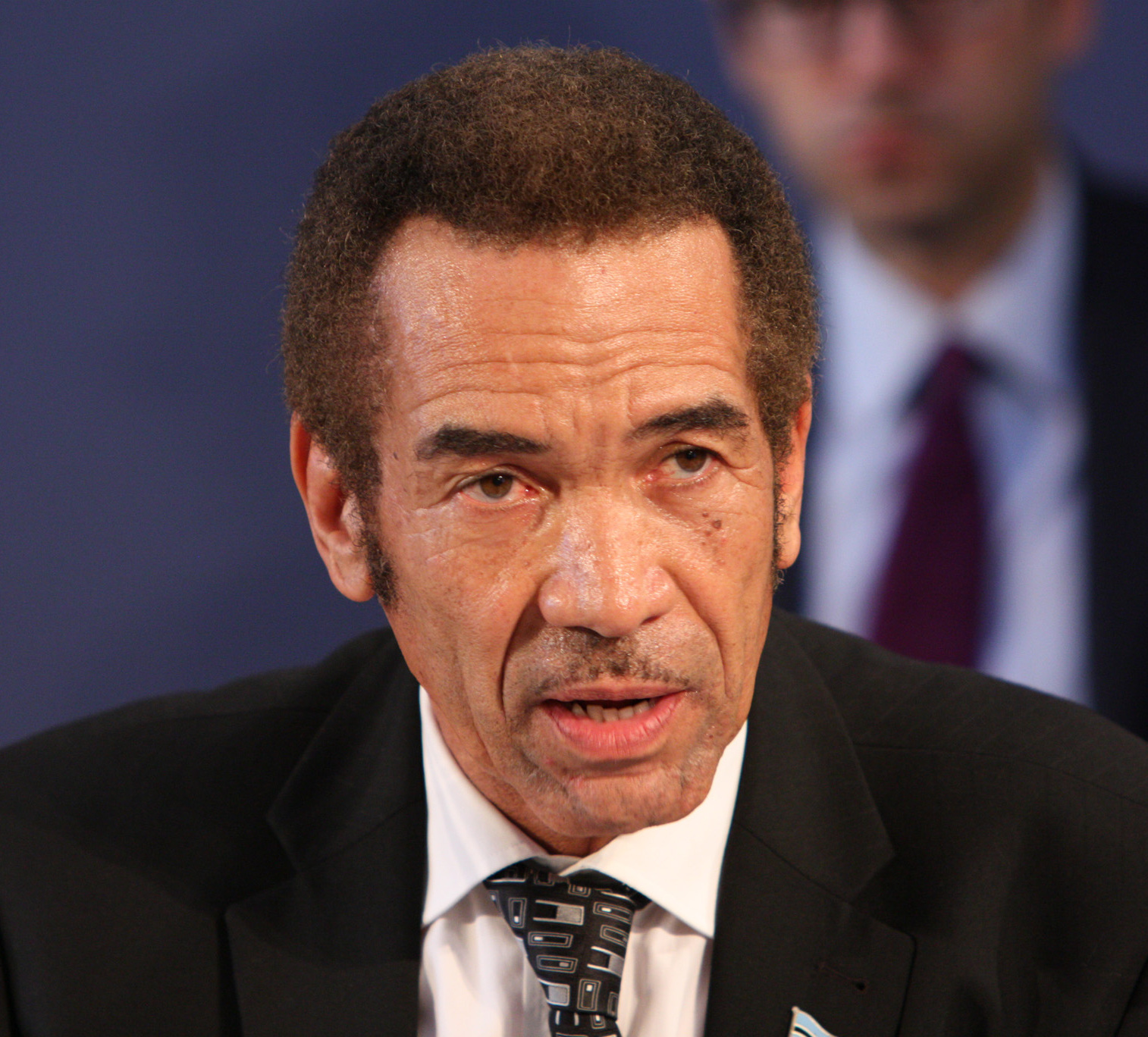
Ian Khama presided over a period marked by economic decline and labour unrest.

Ian Khama assumed the presidency and leadership of the BDP on 1 April 2008, succeeding Mogae after a decade. In his inaugural speech, Khama pledged to continue the course set by the Mogae administration, ruling out "radical changes." However, Khama's presidency coincided with an escalation in the internal conflicts that had plagued the ruling party throughout the previous decade. Upon taking office, Khama stepped down as the BDP leader and Kwelagobe, belonging to a rival faction and a leader of the party's old guard, was selected to replace him. The Barata-Phathi faction, including Gomolemo Motswaledi and Botsalo Ntuane alongside Kwelagobe, criticized Khama's leadership during his early months in office, accusing him of exceeding his prerogatives as a party leader. Motswaledi abandoned his ambition to run for a seat in Serowe to make way for the president's brother, Tshekedi Khama II, but he was soon barred from contesting a seat in Gaborone Central after openly clashing with Khama. Motswaledi lost a lawsuit against Khama when the High Court ruled that the president enjoyed presidential immunity from legal action due to his office. Although voices within the party began criticizing Khama's autocratic tendencies, the president insisted that he was only instilling greater discipline within the BDP.

Khama's initial year in power was characterized by his decision to lead the BDP to adopt a hardline stance against the ZANU–PF regime, led by Robert Mugabe since 1980, during the country's violent elections. Several months later, Kwelagobe and Khama reached a separate agreement to defuse their conflict and project an image of unity in preparation for the 2009 Botswana general election. With the opposition Botswana National Front grappling with a growing internal conflict around its leader, Otsweletse Moupo and several party leaders running as independents, the BDP achieved a sweeping victory, securing 53% of the votes and 45 out of 57 seats. They also gained control of the Gaborone City Council for the first time since 1984. The outcome solidified Khama's control over the party, even though questions about his leadership style persisted throughout his term.

The remainder of the period was marked by economic challenges stemming from Great Recession that significantly impacted Botswana's economy. Khama implemented harsh austerity measures recommended by the International Monetary Fund, leading to conflicts with both the influential Botswana Federation of Public Sector Unions (BOFEPUSU), which staged the longest public service strike in the country's history in 2011 and a substantial faction within the BDP that disapproved of these policies. Motswaledi's faction finally split from the BDP in mid-2010, forming the Botswana Movement for Democracy (BMD), the first significant split experienced by the BDP in its history. In 2012, the BMD, BNF and BPP established the Umbrella for Democratic Change (UDC) coalition, marking the first permanent alliance between various opposition parties since independence, exclusive of the BCP. Motswaledi died in a car accident in 2014 under controversial circumstances, which cast a shadow over the subsequent election campaign.

The 2014 general election was a significant setback for the BDP, marking its worst result in history at that time. They secured only 37 of the 57 seats elected and 46% of the popular vote, compared to the UDC's 30% and the BCP's 20%. The party's losses were particularly pronounced in urban areas, experiencing a resounding defeat in the Gaborone City Council elections, where they ranked third in parliamentary strength behind the UDC and the BCP. This election marked the first instance in the country's electoral history where the party failed to secure over 50% of the popular vote or more than two-thirds of the elected seats. In fact, if the UDC and the BCP were united, they would have won the election. The outcome was attributed to the dissatisfaction of young urban voters with Khama's economic management, while rural voters remained loyal to the party, especially in the Ngwato tribe's territory in the Central District. Nevertheless, the party retained its overall majority, allowing President Khama to serve a second five-year term. After the elections, Khama initiated a cabinet reshuffle and appointed his former Minister of Education, Mokgweetsi Masisi, as vice-president and therefore his direct successor as president.

=== Post-Khama era (2018–2024) ===
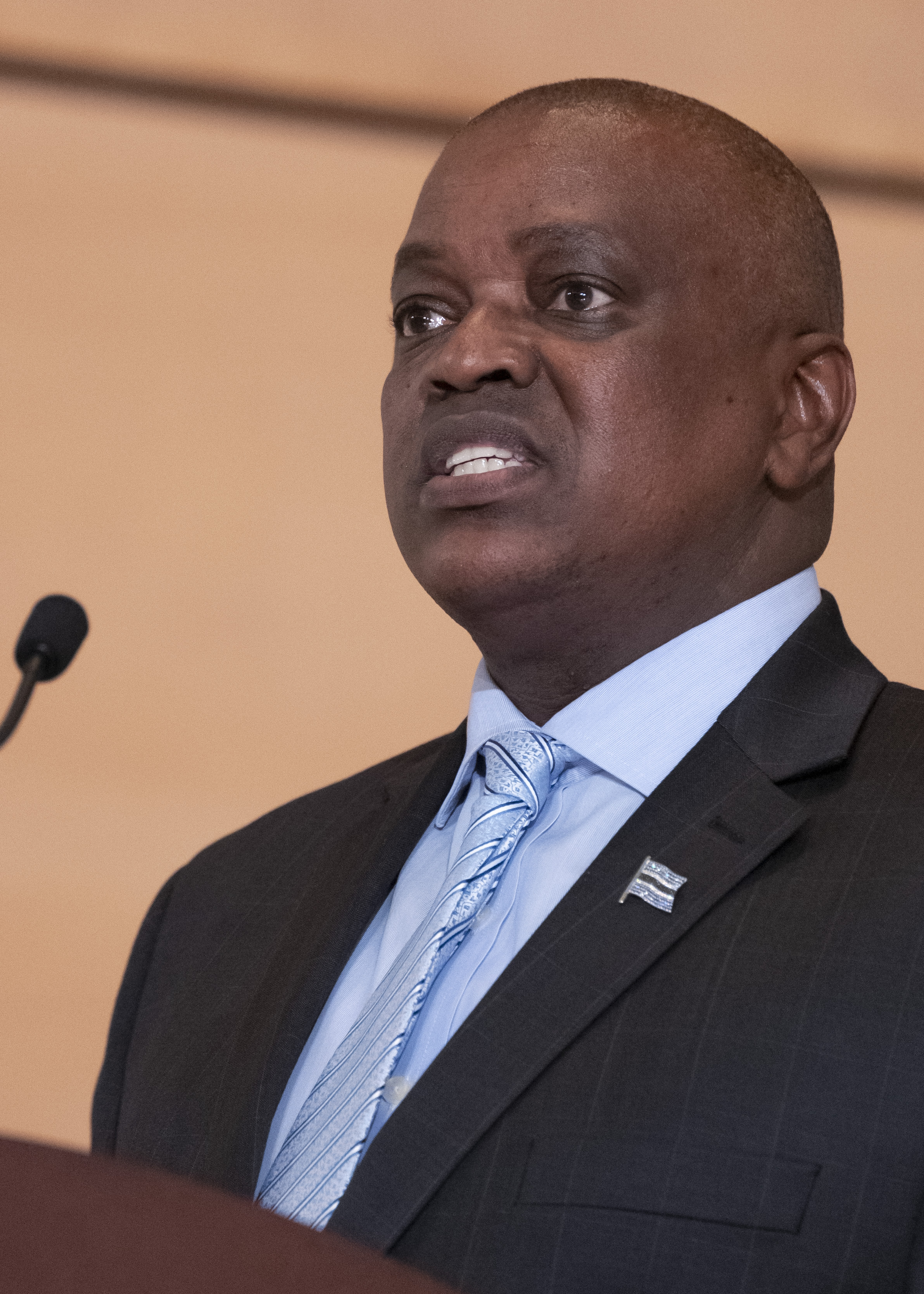
Mokgweetsi Masisi's presidency saw the BDP distance itself away from Khama's leadership and saw significant realignments of Botswana's electoral politics in the 2019 and 2024 general elections.

On 1 April 2018 Khama completed his term and Masisi succeeded him as both the President of Botswana and the leader of the BDP. Seen as closely associated with Khama, Masisi inherited a government and a party suffering a sharp decline in popularity and a weakened economy. Additionally, he faced a united and nominally strengthened opposition after the Botswana Congress Party joined the UDC. Shortly after taking office, Masisi adopted a leadership style distinct from his predecessor and began to politically marginalize the Khama family while revoking various privileges. He also reversed several of Khama's controversial policies and adopted a more conciliatory stance towards the unions.

Between 2018 and 2019, the relationship between the new president and Khama deteriorated to the point where the family severed ties with the BDP in early 2019, accusing Masisi of "treason." Many significant party leaders, particularly in the crucial Central District, Ngwato territory, defected to the newly founded Botswana Patriotic Front (BPF). In constituencies where the BPF could not field a candidate, they supported the UDC. Looking ahead to the 2019 Botswana general election, the BDP adjusted its discourse and adopted a more personalized approach, emphasizing a forward-looking perspective and definitively breaking with the previous administration. With the opposition discredited due to its association with Khama and a reinvigorated leadership, the BDP achieved a comprehensive victory, securing 53% of the vote and 38 of the 57 elected seats.

The election brought about a significant shift in Botswana's electoral politics. The BDP experienced substantial losses in the northern part of the country due to the inclusion of the BCP in the UDC. Furthermore, in the Central District, it was affected by the concentration of the pro-Khama tribal vote in the UDC and the BPF. However, it enjoyed unexpected growth in urban areas and dominated in the southern part of the country, where most of the opposition's primary strongholds had been situated. Boko refused to acknowledge the results, alleging "massive electoral discrepancies," and announced his intention to challenge the election in court. Ultimately, his appeal was dismissed.

=== Political wilderness (2024–present) ===
The 2024 Botswana general election saw the BDP resoundingly defeated by the opposition UDC. In one of the worst defeats of a governing party in the Commonwealth, the BDP lost 90% of its parliamentary representation and was reduced to a rump of four seats out of 61, making it the smallest of the four factions represented in the National Assembly. The BDP was decimated despite finishing with the second-highest national vote share (at 30%). Due to the nature of the first-past-the-post (FPTP) voting system, the geographic dispersion of the BDP's support base across the country proved electorally inefficient in translating votes into seats. Its support was spread evenly nationwide rather than concentrated in enough constituencies to secure a sufficient number of seats. This vote-spread phenomenon resulted in the BDP's votes in all but four constituencies being effectively wasted in psephological terms, thereby ending the party's uninterrupted 58-year majority.

In contrast, the opposition parties benefitted from the FPTP system's bias toward concentrated voter bases. The Botswana Congress Party leveraged its geographically dense support in the north to maximize its seat-to-vote efficiency, securing official opposition status despite trailing the BDP by nine percentage points nationally, leading to an electoral inversion. Similarly, the UDC consolidated its dominance in the southern and western regions and benefited from the steep decline in BDP support, while the pro-Ian Khama Botswana Patriotic Front effectively harnessed its concentrated support in the Ngwato-dominated constituencies around Serowe, allowing it to gain one more seat than the BDP.

With the BDP's defeat beyond doubt, Mokgweetsi Masisi conceded defeat two days after the election and ensured a peaceful transfer of power. Later that day, President Boko was sworn in by Chief Justice Terence Rannowane, allowing him to form the first government since independence with no BDP participation.

At its 41st National Congress held in Maun, the first since its defeat, the BDP elected a new central committee which saw former MP for Gaborone North and cabinet minister, Mpho Balopi replace Masisi as party leader.

== Ideology ==
Although it is typically characterized as a conservative party with a centre-right leaning on the political left–right axis, the BDP's ideological framework is quite broad. Officially, the party upholds national unity, economic development and political democracy as its core values, complemented by the concepts of "kagisano" (lit. ''togetherness'') and "botho" (lit. ''humanity'').

A fundamental factor in maintaining the BDP's electoral dominance has been its unwavering support for Botswana's local tribal traditions. This stance has garnered the backing of Ngwato elites in the eastern part of the country while sometimes leading to the rejection of minority groups and the more globally-oriented urban class. Nevertheless, the BDP also places a strong emphasis on national unity over tribal affiliations, often adopting a civic nationalist rhetoric.

In economic terms, the party has maintained a pragmatic approach. During its initial years in power, the BDP implemented pro-free market policies, ensuring low and stable taxes to stimulate foreign investment and encourage mining company activities in the country while deterring budget evasion. The revenues generated from these endeavors were allocated to expanding the nation's infrastructure, which was practically non-existent at the time of independence, as well as strengthening the healthcare and education systems. Additionally, alternative industries such as livestock were nationalized. The party's consistent defense of social solidarity and the welfare state, combined with its mixed economic policies, traditionalism and clear rejection of leftist or Marxist ideologies, have led foreign analysts to sometimes characterize the BDP as a proponent of "paternalistic conservatism".

The BDP is relatively conservative on social issues, primarily influenced by the fact that Botswana is predominantly a Protestant Christian nation. However, some party members have expressed liberal viewpoints on certain sensitive topics, including LGBT rights. The BDP has maintained its support for the death penalty, making Botswana the sole country in the Southern African Development Community that continues to enforce it. The party has rejected calls for its repeal, asserting that a majority of Botswana's population favors its continuation. In terms of security, the BDP initially allocated minimal spending to the country's territorial defense during its early years in government, prioritizing economic and social development. The party only established a professional army when faced with the serious threat of military incursions by apartheid South Africa.

Regarding foreign policy, the BDP has historically adopted a Western-oriented approach, aligning closely with the United States, NATO and the European Union. This stance has prompted criticism from its detractors, particularly those from a leftist tradition, who have labeled the party as a "neocolonial" entity. Nonetheless, the party maintained a staunch opposition to the white minority regimes in neighboring South Africa, South West Africa and Rhodesia during its initial three decades in power, collaborating with forces opposing these regimes, such as the African National Congress (ANC).

Under the leadership of Ian Khama, the BDP adopted a more assertive stance in promoting democracy in Africa through its foreign policy. It engaged in open conflict with the ZANU–PF government in neighboring Zimbabwe, accusing it of human rights violations. In recent years, the party has reaffirmed its historical role as a significant player in the struggle for Botswana's decolonization and independence. Once Mokgweetsi Masisi became president it became a part of the regional organization Former Liberation Movements of Southern Africa (FLMSA) in 2019, predominantly consisting of socialist parties that participated in African nationalist movements against colonialism or white minority regimes in southern Africa. Many of these parties now govern their countries as dominant and/or autocratic parties. Nevertheless, the BDP and its government continue to view themselves as allies of the West in international affairs, particularly on issues such as the Russian invasion of Ukraine, as they consistently vote in favor of condemnatory United Nations resolutions. Sponsored by the ANC, the BDP joined the Socialist International as an "observer member" in 2014.

== Electoral history ==
=== National Assembly ===
Election	Party leader	Votes	%	Seats	+/–	Position	Result
1965	Seretse Khama	113,167	80.4%	28 / 31	New	▲1st	Supermajority government
1969	Seretse Khama	52,218	68.3%	24 / 31	▼4	1st	Supermajority government
1974	Seretse Khama	49,047	76.6%	27 / 32	▲3	1st	Supermajority government
1979	Seretse Khama	101,098	75.2%	29 / 32	▲2	1st	Supermajority government
1984	Quett Masire	154,863	68.0%	29 / 34	0	1st	Supermajority government
1989	Quett Masire	162,277	64.8%	31 / 34	▲2	1st	Supermajority government
1994	Quett Masire	154,705	54.6%	27 / 40	▼4	1st	Supermajority government
1999	Festus Mogae	192,598	57.1%	33 / 40	▲6	1st	Supermajority government
2004	Festus Mogae	213,308	51.7%	44 / 57	▲11	1st	Supermajority government
2009	Ian Khama	290,099	53.3%	45 / 57	▲1	1st	Supermajority government
2014	Ian Khama	320,657	46.5%	37 / 57	▼8	1st	Majority government
2019	Mokgweetsi Masisi	405,719	52.7%	38 / 57	▲1	1st	Supermajority government
2024	Mokgweetsi Masisi	254,583	30.5%	4 / 61	▼34	▼4th	Opposition
