= Botswana National Front =

Political party in Botswana

- Abbreviation: BNF
- President: Duma Boko
- Vice-President: Moeti Mohwasa
- Founded: 3 October 1965
- Ideology: Social democracy Christian left 1965–1994: Democratic socialism
- Political position: Centre-left; 1965–1994: Left-wing
- National affiliation: Umbrella for Democratic Change
- International affiliation: Centrist Democrat International
- National Assembly: 23 / 61

Party flag

Website
- votebnf.com

The Botswana National Front (BNF) is a social democratic political party in Botswana. It was the main opposition party in Botswana from the 1969 elections until the 2024 elections. It is the largest component of the governing Umbrella for Democratic Change coalition; Party leader Duma Boko has been President of Botswana since 2024.

Until 2024, the party’s greatest electoral success was in the 1994 elections, when it won 37.1% of the vote and 13 of 40 parliamentary seats. A factional conflict in 1998 led to the departure of 11 of these MPs, who then founded the Botswana Congress Party (BCP). In the 1999 elections, the BNF's vote share declined to 26% and it won 6 parliamentary seats. In the 2004 general election the party won 26.1% of the popular vote and 12 out of 57 seats. Its representation was sharply reduced in the 2009 elections, with the party reduced to only six seats in the National Assembly of Botswana. The BNF's parliamentary representation fell to 5 seats following the defection of the party's former Vice president, Olebile Gaborone, to the Botswana Democratic Party (BDP) in July 2010.

== History ==
The BNF was founded in 1965, shortly after the Botswana Democratic Party (BDP)'s landslide victory in the self-government elections and just before Botswana gained independence. The initial goal of the BNF was to reunite the various strands of the Botswana People's Party, which had experienced a split in 1963–1964, and others opposed to the BDP. In 1969, Bathoen Gaseitsiwe resigned from his state-recognized position as chief of the Bangwaketse (a group in Southern Botswana) and joined the BNF. Throughout the 1970s and 1980s, the BNF was a loose alliance between conservative tribal leaders concerned with the preservation of traditional authority, led by Bathoen Gaseitsiwe, and socialists, led by Kenneth Koma, concerned over the bourgeois policies of the government. The first time that the party had been represented nationally was in 1969 when they won three seats in the Ngwaketse region.

The BNF was largely a regional party associated with the Ngwaketse region in the 1970s, but it gradually gained support in other parts of the country. In the 1984 general elections, the BNF gained control of the Gaborone City Council and other urban councils; it also won five of 34 parliamentary seats. In 1994, 13 BNF candidates were elected as members of the National Assembly (out of 40 total). Prior to the elections, the party redefined itself in terms of the ideology of social democracy. It was an observer member of the Socialist International. By 1994 the party had adopted the motto "Time for change". The electoral success and change of motto largely reflected decreased standard of living, civil unrest and rising levels of AIDS in the country.

There have been a number of internal squabbles in the party due largely to factionalism. This has led to the splitting of the party a number of times and the formation of splinter parties whose political ideologies are not appreciably different from that of the BNF. Several splinter parties formed in 1989 and 1994, but the most serious split occurred in 1998 when a dispute over Kenneth Koma's leadership resulted in the departure of the majority of the party's parliamentary wing (11 of 13 MPs) and the formation of the Botswana Congress Party (BCP). The split followed an aborted BNF party congress, dissolution of the central committee by Koma, and a bitter court case. In 2003, ongoing factional conflict prompted the BNF's founder, Kenneth Koma, to form the New Democratic Front. Of these splinter parties, the BCP has gained the most popular support.

In elections in 1999 and 2004, vote-splitting between the BNF and the BCP reduced the parliamentary representation of both the BNF and the opposition as a whole. The BNF retained only 6 of its 13 parliamentary seats in 1999 and the BCP won only one seat. An increase in the number of constituencies from 40 to 57 allowed the BNF to win 12 seats in 2009 despite no meaningful change in its vote share. The BCP did not benefit from the expansion of seats and again won only one seat.

Until July 2010, the party was led by Otsweletse Moupo. Moupo himself has emphasized the need to help the poor escape from poverty. Moupo experienced a number of public embarrassments in 2006 that led to serious and mounting challenges from within the party. Moupo's leadership was reaffirmed at a special party congress in 2007, but his opponents continued to challenge his leadership. In 2008 and 2009, the BNF suspended or expelled several prominent members, including several of its parliamentary representatives, and fought several court battles related to primary elections.

In the 2009 elections, several former members of the BNF ran as independent candidates, referring to themselves as the Temporary Platform. The BNF suffered significant losses; it won six seats. The BCP formed an electoral pact with the Botswana Alliance Movement and the NDF and increased its representation from one seat to five. Vote-splitting continues to be a problem in that the BDP often wins seats when all three parties are competitive. This occurs most often in urban areas. But the BDP also took seats from the BNF in rural constituencies where the BCP did not have a candidate.

Otsweletse Moupo decided that he would not defend his position as party president and Duma Boko was elected as the new party president in July 2010.

== Notable members ==
- Duma Boko
- Kenneth Koma
- Moeti Mohwasa
- Otsweletse Moupo
- Stephen Modise
- Otlaadisa Koosaletse

== Electoral history ==
=== National Assembly ===
Election	Party leader	Votes	%	Seats	+/–	Position	Status
1969	Bathoen Gaseitsiwe	10,410	13.60%	3 / 31	New	▲2nd	Opposition
1974	Bathoen Gaseitsiwe	7,358	11.49%	2 / 32	▼1	2nd	Opposition
1979	Kenneth Koma	17,480	13.00%	2 / 32	Steady	2nd	Opposition
1984	Kenneth Koma	46,550	20.44%	4 / 34	▲2	2nd	Opposition
1989	Kenneth Koma	67,513	26.95%	3 / 34	▼1	2nd	Opposition
1994	Kenneth Koma	105,109	37.09%	13 / 40	▲10	2nd	Opposition
1999	Kenneth Koma	87,457	25.95%	6 / 40	▼7	2nd	Opposition
2004	Otsweletse Moupo	107,451	26.06%	12 / 57	▲6	2nd	Opposition
2009	Otsweletse Moupo	119,509	21.94%	6 / 57	▼6	2nd	Opposition
2014 (Note: Run as part of the Umbrella for Democratic Change coalition.)	Duma Boko	114,741	16.62%	8 / 57	▲2	▼3rd	Opposition
2019	Duma Boko	148,122	19.18%	4 / 57	▼4	3rd	Opposition
2024	Duma Boko	193,166	23.13%	23 / 61	▲19	▲1st	Government
