= Ngamiland West =

- Subdistrict
- Location in Botswana
- Coordinates: 19°09′00″S 23°04′12″E
- Country: Botswana
- District: North-West District (Botswana)

Population (2011)
  - Total: 59,421

Ngamiland West is one of the subdistricts of Ngamiland District of Botswana.

== Villages ==
- Beetsha
- Chukumuchu
- Eretsha
- Etsha 1
- Etsha 13
- Etsha 6
- Gani
- Gonutsuga
- Gudingwa
- Gumare
- Ikoga
- Kajaja
- Kauxwhi
- Mogomotho
- Mohembo East
- Mohembo West
- Mokgacha
- Ngarange
- Nokaneng
- Nxamasere
- Nxaunxau
- Qangwa
- Samochema
- Sekondomboro
- Sepopa
- Seronga
- Shakawe
- Tobere
- Tubu
- Xakao
- Xaxa
- Xhauga

== Localities ==
- Animal Health & Production C
- B D F Camp
- Badiba
- Baku
- Bate
- Beetsha
- Beetsha Lands
- Boajankwe
- Bodumatau
- Bolatswanamane
- Botshabelo
- Ceba
- Chiki
- Chombona
- Chukumuchu Vet Camp
- Congo
- Danga
- Dikgakana
- Dineha
- Dineva
- Dirurubele
- Ditjao
- Ditlou
- Divitama
- Dobe
- Dobe Boarder gate
- Dobe Vet Camp
- Dobechaa
- Dungu
- Easy Link Farm
- Elephant
- Etsha No 10
- Etsha No 11
- Etsha No 12
- Etsha No 2
- Etsha No 3
- Etsha No 4
- Etsha No 5
- Etsha No 7
- Etsha No 8
- Etsha No 9
- Fire Fighting Camp
- Fishing Camp
- Garukwi
- Ghanichaochao
- Gildenhuys
- Gombo
- Gonitsuga
- Gowe
- Grecha Lands
- Gucha
- Guda
- Ikoga gate
- Ipope
- Jaganxo
- James BDF Camp
- Jororo
- Juiree
- Kachirachira
- Kadangasa
- Kadwi
- Kaepe
- Kajaja
- Kajaja 1
- Kajaja 2
- Kajaja Lands
- Kamburu
- Kanana
- Kanyamokura
- Kapotora Lands
- Kapotora Veterinary Camp
- Karui
- Katalangoti
- Katlapa
- Katu
- Kawaronga
- Kawoyo
- Kgomokgwana
- Kgomokgwana Vet Camp
- Kihabe MTB Mining
- Kiho 85 Vet Camp
- Kilo 40
- Kilo 60
- Kobokuboga
- Kogobiye
- Krokovango croc farm
- Kubuga
- Kuringama
- Kwando 1
- Kwando 2
- Kwaronga
- Kwaxiana
- Lagoon Camp
- Lebala Camp
- Lejao
- Lobala
- Maano
- Magopa
- Mahito
- Mahorameno
- Majwana
- Malatsong
- Mangawe
- Manyondo
- Mapororo a ga Kayombo
- Maronga Gate 1
- Maronga II
- Mathabanelo
- Matswee
- Mbiroba
- Metsiakogodimo
- Metsimatala
- Mmadikgabo
- Moaha
- Moana
- Modia
- Mogotlho
- Moiyagogo
- Mokgalo
- Mokolwane
- Mokwelekgele
- Moporota
- Morambajiwa
- Motswere
- Mowana
- Mowana
- Nakana
- Ndangu
- Ndorotsha
- Ndorotsha Lands
- Nende
- Ngaracha
- Ngarangobe
- Ngurungome
- Njou
- Njou
- Njova
- Njovo
- Nxabeqau
- Nxadao
- Nxamazana
- Nxaunxau
- Nxauxau
- Nxiniga
- Nxlomosabodi
- Nxomokao
- Nxonicha
- Nxwee
- Nxweree
- Obare
- Okavango Game Farming
- Okhutse
- Omojiri
- Palamaokue
- Palamaokuwe
- Pampiri
- Phatayanare
- Phatswa
- Polamosege
- Qoboga
- Rekonda
- Rekonga BDF Camp
- Road Camp Gucha
- Roads Camp
- Roads Maintenance Camp
- Romaso
- Roye
- Rural Roads Camp
- Saikarangwe
- Samoho
- Samorwa
- Samoti
- Samoxuma
- Sechenje
- Sekandoko/Shandokwe/Bana
- Sekondomboro
- Semotsoka
- Senono
- Seronga BDF Base Camp
- Sesagarapa
- Sesatire
- Seshokora
- Setoto
- Shadinota
- Shakanjara
- Shamagwagwa
- Shamathu
- Shaowe
- Shongweshongo
- Somogwe
- Tamboravati Camp
- Tamochaa Vet Camp
- Taudumo Gate
- Teekae
- Thabuku
- Thale
- Thamache
- Thinxo
- Tjaakwe Gate
- Tjaakwe Vet Gate
- Tjikumutju\Chukumuchu
- Tjiperengo
- Tlama
- Tobere 3
- Tobere 4
- Tobere Lands
- Tsaa
- Tshwanda (Xawache)
- Tsodilo Hills
- Tsokong
- Tsutsuruka
- Tuponguta
- Upanda
- Vet Camp A1
- Wao
- Wao
- Xabache
- Xabe
- Xamocha
- Xamoga
- Xamukucha
- Xaodumo
- Xaree
- Xarobe
- Xaweche
- Xaxana
- Xcacha
- Xhaba
- Xhademoxhao
- Xhanxago
- Xhaoga
- Xhau
- Xhauga Lands
- Xheo
- Xhoroma Veterinary Camp
- Xhowi
- Xhwiihaba Vet Camp
- Xinigoba
- Xokwedau
- Xoro
- Xoshe
- Xowa
- Xube
- Xurube
- Xwexwe
- Xwima
- Yamoxereku
- Zambia (località del Botswana)
- Zanibe I
- Zao
- Zaza
- Zeneva II
