= Ngamiland East =

- Subdistrict
- Location in Botswana
- Coordinates: 19°54′S 23°00′E
- Country: Botswana
- District: North-West District (Botswana)

Population (2011)
  - Total: 90,334

Ngamiland East is one of the subdistricts of Ngamiland District of Botswana.

== Villages ==
- Bodibeng
- Botlhatlogo
- Chanoga
- Habu
- Kareng
- Kgakge/Makakung
- Komana
- Mababe
- Makalamabedi
- Matlapana
- Matsaudi/Sakapane
- Maun
- Phuduhudu
- Sankuyo
- Sehithwa
- Semboyo
- Shorobe
- Toteng
- Tsao

== Localities ==
- A.1.2 Vet Camp
- A.I. Camp
- Amusangwana
- Audi
- B.D.F Camp
- Baapelo
- Babalelampa
- Bamotshaa
- Bantshaa
- Birds Camp
- BLDC Ranch
- Bobaatlhogo
- Bodirelakgomo
- Bodumatau
- Bodumatau
- Boesi
- Bogare
- Bohiwakgoma
- Boiketso
- Boikhutso
- Boitapoloso
- Boitumelo
- Bolapologo
- Bomakwhe
- Bomoxwa
- Bonno
- Borakalalo
- Boro
- Boro B.D.F
- Boro Prisons
- Boseto Copper Mine
- Boseto Copper Mine
- Boswelaphiri
- Bothakga
- Bothulakgomo
- Botshabelo
- Botshelo
- Botshelo
- Boura
- Buffalo Trials Camp 1
- Buffalo Trials Camp 2
- Camp
- Camp Dizhana
- Chelete
- Chixoma
- Chuchubega
- Chuchubega Water Affairs
- Crocodile Camp
- Daugha
- Dautsa
- Deception Valley Lodge
- Diakwe Quarantine Camp
- Dikgakana
- Dikgatho
- Dikgatlhong (Maun)
- Dikgongtseditshweu
- Dinao
- Dinokwane
- Diphalana
- Dipuo
- Dithapelo
- Dithutwana
- Ditoro
- Ditoro
- Ditotoma
- Dobe
- Gabamochaa
- Game
- Gaonwe
- Gogomoga
- Golaobone
- Goodhope
- Goruku
- Gwedao
- Gxwegxwa
- Hainaveld 66-70 Conservacy
- Hitato
- Ikageng
- Inola
- Ipelegeng
- Island Safari Lodge
- John's Farm
- Joo
- Jovurega
- Kaberekele
- Kaepe
- Kaibara
- Kakanaga
- Kamisetso
- Kamote
- Kanana
- Kangoa
- Kanjuwe
- Kaokemo
- Karatshaa
- Katoo
- Kaure
- Kgantshang
- Kgaolo
- Kgetsiyatsie
- Kgolagano
- Kgomotshwaana
- Kgomotshwaana Gate
- Kgopisamotswana
- Kgoria
- Kgwebe
- Khooxoba
- Khorotsau
- Khudutlou
- Khwai Camp
- Khwai River Lodge
- Khwareng
- Kombakata
- Konde
- Kookale
- Koromo
- Kouwe
- Kumokoga
- Kwarabe
- Latlhamatla
- Lebaleng
- Lebu (Ngamiland East)
- Lediba
- LedibalaDikubu
- Legae
- Legotlhwana
- Lekurwane
- Lentswana
- Lentswana
- Lerobo
- Letlhajwa
- Liverpool
- Mababe Hunting Camp /
- Mabeleapodi
- Mabono
- Machaba Camp
- Machera
- Maego
- Maile
- Maiteko
- Majakomabedi
- Makakung
- Makalamabedi North Gate
- Makgabaganyane
- Makgabana
- Makgadikgadi Wildlife Camp
- Makgokong
- Makoba
- Makolwane
- Makula
- Makutsomo
- Makwelekwele/Makgelekgele
- Malalakgakana
- Malomatsebe
- Maloto
- Mangororo
- Mankwe Bush Camp
- Manoga 1
- Mantsentsela
- Mapeno
- Maphane
- Maphane/Thaere
- Mapororo
- Mapororo Gate
- Mapororo Properties
- Maputi
- Maragana
- Maretlwana
- Marophe
- Marothodi
- Marula
- Marula
- Masabango
- Masamo
- Maselenyane
- Masogwana
- Masongwana
- Masu
- Matabolaga
- Mathamagana
- Matlhomahibidu
- Matsaudi
- Matsebe
- Matseke
- Maumo
- Maun Rest Camp
- Maun Wildlife
- Mawana
- Mawana Vet Gate
- Menomasweu
- Meriroriro
- Metsi-a-Kgomo
- Metsimotse
- Mgotlho Photography Camp
- Mmadinotshe
- Mmaetsho
- Mmakebana
- Mmamotaung
- Mmatakgomo
- Mmatakgomo
- Mmumosweu
- Mochabeng
- Mochabo
- Modimonthusa
- Modimooteng
- Moenyana
- Mogapelwa
- Mogobewathakadu
- Mogorogorowatau
- Mogowagowe
- Mokgalo
- Mokgalo
- Mokgalo/Haka
- Mokolwane
- Mokolwane
- Mokutsumo
- Molatswana
- Mopako
- Mophane
- Moporota
- Moremogolo
- Morobana
- Morula
- Mosarasarane
- Moselewapula
- Mosetlho
- Moshu
- Mosimanewadiphiri
- Mosumoleele
- Motlopi
- Motopi Airport
- Motopi P.W.D. Camp
- Motopi Vet Camp
- Mowana (Sehithwa)
- Mpayabana
- Mpayakgori
- Mpayamonna
- Mpayanonyane
- Mphametsi
- Mphampha
- Mphampha SSG Camp
- Mphoyame
- Mphoyamodimo
- Mushu
- Nagotona
- Nakalatswii
- Namanyane
- Nametsapelo
- Namolaleuba
- Naone
- New Makolwane Camp
- Ngoya
- Ngwanaitseele
- Nisa Vula
- Nnakgolo
- Ntshapelo
- Nxabe
- Nxame
- Nxanxana
- Nxenekau
- Nxharaga
- Odiakwa
- Okavango River Lodge
- Palamaokuwe
- Pegasegwana
- Pelobotlhoko
- Pelotelele
- Pelotshetlha
- Pelotshwaana
- Pelotshweu
- Pelotshweu
- Peteke
- Peteke Gate
- Phakawe
- Phalaphala BDF Camp
- Phalaphala Vet Camp
- Phatlhana
- Phatswe
- Phefodiafoka
- Phefodiafoka
- Phefodiafoka Gates
- Phenyo
- Phirieatsena
- Phuduhudu
- Phuduhudu Lands
- Phuduhudu wildlife camp
- Phuthologo
- Polokabatho
- Polokabatho
- Polokabatho
- Qonga
- Ramosuwana
- Ranch No.80
- Riverland/Thaji
- Roads Camp
- Roads Camp
- Roads Maintenance Camp
- Roman
- Rombale
- Rongwa
- Sakadana
- Samodupi
- Sankoyo New Camp
- Sankwasa
- Santawana Lodge & Work Camp
- Sanyana
- Seamogano
- Sebakhudu
- Sedibana
- Sedibana
- Sedibana
- Seerose
- Segolame
- Segolame
- Segolame
- Sekwaxamo
- Semaotwana
- Semente/Kakana
- Semolo
- Semphete
- Seokgwe
- Sepanapoleke
- Serurubele
- Setata Gate
- Setata Gate
- Setateng
- Sethebe
- Setsau
- Sexaxa
- Shandereke/Kaziekene Camp
- Shashe
- Shendango
- Shewaronga
- Shirobazo
- Shokomokwe
- Sitatunga Camp
- Somela
- Somela 1
- South Gate Camp
- Sulabompe
- Tatamoga
- Tauyanamane
- Tebogo
- Tenge
- Thamalakane
- Thapolathari
- Thari ya Nanane
- Thololamoro
- Tianoga
- Tjivaneno
- Tlhalogane
- Tolankwe
- Tsanekona
- Tsaro Elephant Lodge
- Tsatsabaga
- Tsetseku
- Tshadamo
- Tshelo jwa Motswana
- Tshenolo
- Tshimologo
- Tshipidi
- Tshipidi
- Tsholofelo
- Tshwaragano
- Tshwaragano 1
- Tsibogo-la-Matebele
- Tsogaboroko
- Tsogaobone
- Tsoku
- Tsoronyatli
- Tswelenyane
- Tudika
- Wild dog Research
- Workers Camp & Safari Camp
- Xabarachaa
- Xabaxwa
- Xadora/Nanogaonne
- Xaega
- Xakukara
- Xangoro
- Xaraxau Flats
- Xhabo SSG Camp
- Xhai Pan Turn Off
- Xhana
- Xharaxhe
- Xhatsitso
- Xheche
- Xheke Lands
- Xhiredom
- Xhobe
- Xhoga
- Xhoga SSG Camp
- Xhomo
- Xhutego
- Xhwango
- Xhwee
- Xininkhwe
- Xirixara Wildlife Camp
- Xoboga
- Xoo
- Xoo
- Xuxau
- Xwamote
