= Okavango (Botswana constituency) =

Parliamentary constituency in the North-West District of Botswana, 1965–2024

- Former Single-member constituency for the National Assembly
- Boundary of Okavango in Botswana
- District: North-West District
- Population: 44,690
- Area: 32,095 km^{2}

Former constituency
- Created: 1965
- Abolished: 2024
- Replaced by: Okavango East; Okavango West

Okavango was a constituency in the North-West District. Following the completion of the 2022 Delimitation of Parliamentary constituencies, the existing seat was abolished and replaced by two new constituencies, Okavango East and Okavango West, first contested at the 2024 general election.

== Constituency profile ==
The Okavango constituency was located in the north of North-West District and existed with the majority of its boundaries intact from the first inaugural elections in 1965 until 2024, making it one of the longest-running constituencies in Botswana's electoral history.

Throughout its existence, Okavango has generally remained an opposition stronghold and the region that has voted the least for the BDP since Botswana's independence (the party only won the constituency in 1965, 1979 and 2004). Between 1969 and 1979 it was represented by the BIP, between 1984 and 1999 by the BNF and from 1999 to 2024 it voted mostly for BCP candidates. In 2022, the delimitation commission recommended the division of Okavango into two constituencies, abolishing the constituency.

The constituency, predominantly rural, encompassed the following villages:

1. Ikoga
2. Sepopa
3. Nxamasere
4. Samochema
5. Shakawe
6. Gani
7. Mohembo East
8. Tsodilo
9. Chukumuchu
10. Nxauxau
11. Tobera
12. Mohembo West
13. Kauxwi
14. Xakao
15. Sekondomboro
16. Nkarange
17. Mogotlho
18. Seronga
19. Gonutsuga
20. Eretsha
21. Beetsha
22. Gudigwa

== Members of Parliament ==
Key: BDP BIP BNF BCP UDC

Election	Winner
1965 election	Tsheko Tsheko
1969 election	Motsamai Mpho
1974 election	Motsamai Mpho
1979 election	Bailang Salepito
1984 election	Joseph Kavindama
1989 election	Joseph Kavindama
1994 election	Joseph Kavindama
1999 election	Joseph Kavindama
2004 election	Vister Moruti
2009 election	Bagalatia Arone
2014 election	Bagalatia Arone
2019 election	Kenny Kapinga

== Election results ==
=== 2019 election ===
General election 2019: Okavango
Party	Candidate	Votes	%	±%
UDC	Kenny Kapinga	7,577	51.11	–5.28
BDP	Mbahahauka Kambimba	6,816	45.98	+2.38
AP	Kabelo Mahupe	432	2.91	N/A
Margin of victory		761	5.13	−5.95
Total valid votes		14,825	99.10	+0.47
Rejected ballots		134	0.90	−0.47
Turnout		14,959	84.86	+1.37
Registered electors		17,628		
UDC hold		Swing	–1.45	

=== 2014 election ===
General election 2014: Okavango
Party	Candidate	Votes	%	±%
BCP	Bagalatia Arone	6,864	54.68	−4.36
BDP	Mbahahauka Kambimba	5,473	43.60	+2.64
UDC	Vister Moruti	215	1.71	−39.25
Margin of victory		1,391	11.08	−7.0
Total valid votes		12,552	98.63	+1.68
Rejected ballots		174	1.37	−1.68
Turnout		12,726	83.49	+6.89
Registered electors		15,243		
BCP hold		Swing	−3.5	

=== 2009 election ===
General election 2009: Okavango
Party	Candidate	Votes	%	±%
BCP	Bagalatia Arone	6,211	59.04	+14.0
BDP	Vister Moruti	4,309	40.96	−7.07
Margin of victory		1.902	18.08	N/A
Total valid votes		10,520	96.95	+0.53
Rejected ballots		331	3.05	−0.53
Turnout		10,851	76.60	−6.48
Registered electors		14,166		
BCP gain from BDP		Swing	+10.54	

=== 2004 election ===
General election 2004: Okavango
Party	Candidate	Votes	%	±%
BDP	Vister Moruti	4,025	48.03	+4.21
BCP	Joseph Kavindama	3,774	45.04	+1.03
BAM	Sakuze Otukeseng	581	6.93	−2.6
Margin of victory		433	7.67	N/A
Total valid votes		8,380	96.42	−3.33
Rejected ballots		311	3.58	+3.33
Turnout		8,691	83.08	−4.13
Registered electors		10,461		
BDP gain from BCP		Swing	+1.50	

=== 1999 election ===
General election 1999: Okavango
Party	Candidate	Votes	%	±%
BCP	Joseph Kavindama	4,308	44.01	−7.01
BDP	Vister Moruti	4,226	43.18	−8.10
BAM	M. Kwamovu	933	9.53	+4.38
BNF	S.A. Sitemo	321	3.28	−47.74
Margin of victory		82	0.83	−15.11
Total valid votes		9,788	93.09	N/A
Rejected ballots		726	6.91	N/A
Turnout		10,514	78.95	+11.49
Registered electors		13,318		
BCP hold		Swing	−7.56	

=== 1994 election ===
General election 1994: Okavango
Party	Candidate	Votes	%	±%
BNF	Joseph Kavindama	3,181	51.02	+4.95
BDP	Vister Moruti	2,187	35.08	+0.57
IFP	M. M. Mogae	1,392	13.91	−5.5
Margin of victory		994	15.94	+4.38
Turnout		6,235	67.46	+6.73
Registered electors		9,242		
BNF hold		Swing	+2.76	

=== 1989 election ===
General election 1989: Okavango
Party	Candidate	Votes	%	±%
BNF	Joseph Kavindama	3,304	46.07	+6.98
BDP	Vister Moruti	2,475	34.51	+4.48
BIP	Motsamai Mpho	1,392	19.41	−11.47
Margin of victory		829	11.56	+3.35
Turnout		7,171	60.73	−12.05
Registered electors		11,808		
BNF hold		Swing	+5.73	

=== 1984 election ===
General election 1984: Okavango
Party	Candidate	Votes	%	±%
BNF	Joseph Kavindama	2,719	39.09	+35.12
BIP	Motsamai Mpho	2,148	30.88	−4.87
BDP	Bailang Salepito	2,089	30.03	−30.25
Margin of victory		571	8.21	N/A
Turnout		6,956	72.78	+14.55
Registered electors		9,557		
BNF gain from BDP		Swing	+20.0	

=== 1979 election ===
General election 1979: Okavango
Party	Candidate	Votes	%	±%
BDP	Bailang Salepito	4,099	60.28	+12.13
BIP	Motsamai Mpho	2,431	35.75	−16.1
Independent	Joseph Kavindama	270	3.97	N/A
Margin of victory		1,668	24.53	N/A
Turnout		6,800	58.23	+33.07
Registered electors		11,678		
BDP gain from BIP		Swing	+14.11	

=== 1974 election ===
General election 1974: Okavango
Party	Candidate	Votes	%	±%
BIP	Motsamai Mpho	1,204	51.85	−4.33
BDP	Modisang Modisang	1,118	48.15	+4.33
Margin of victory		85	3.7	−8.66
Turnout		2,322	25.16	−22.11
Registered electors		9,230		
BIP hold		Swing	−4.33	

=== 1969 election ===
General election 1969: Okavango
Party	Candidate	Votes	%	±%
BIP	Motsamai Mpho	1,923	56.18	+9.84
BDP	Tsheko Tsheko	1,500	43.82	−9.84
Margin of victory		423	12.36	N/A
Turnout		3,423	47.27	N/A
Registered electors		7,241		
BIP gain from BDP		Swing	+9.84	

=== 1965 election ===
General election 1965: Okavango
Party	Candidate	Votes	%
BDP	Tsheko Tsheko	1,929	53.66
BIP	Motsamai Mpho	1,666	46.34
Margin of victory		263	7.32
Turnout		3,595	N/A
Registered electors		N/A	
BDP win (new seat)			
