= Ngami (Botswana constituency) =

Parliamentary constituency in the North-West District of Botswana, 1965 onwards

- Single-member constituency for the National Assembly
- District: North-West District
- Population: 27,777
- Area: 18,391 km^{2}

Current constituency
- Created: 1965
- Party: BCP
- MP: Phillimon Aaron
- Margin of victory: 2,255 (22.8 pp)

Ngami is a constituency in the North-West District represented in the National Assembly of Botswana since 2024 by Phillimon Aaron of the Botswana Congress Party.

== Constituency profile ==
Ngami is one of the few constituencies created for the inaugural National Assembly elections in 1965 that has kept its name since then. From 1965 until the 2000s, Ngami was a safe seat for the BDP. The seat became more competitive from 2004 and in 2009 Goyamang Habano from the BAM (later merged with the BCP) was elected as the first non-BDP MP in the constituency. The BDP narrowly regained the constituency in 2014 by 48 votes from the BCP. In 2019, after the BCP joined the UDC, it regained the seat in the context of an opposition sweep in the North-West District and was won by the BCP in 2024. The constituency, predominantly rural, encompasses the following villages:

1. Gumare
2. Etsha 1
3. Etsha 6
4. Nokaneng
5. Qangwa
6. Xaxa
7. Tubu
8. Habu

== Members of Parliament ==
Key: BDP BAM UDC

Election	Winner
1965 election	Gaerolwe Kwerepe
1969 election	Gaerolwe Kwerepe
1974 election	Gaerolwe Kwerepe
1979 election	Gaerolwe Kwerepe
1984 election	Gaerolwe Kwerepe
1989 election	Gaerolwe Kwerepe
1994 election	Jacob Nkate
1999 election	Jacob Nkate
2004 election	Jacob Nkate
2009 election	Goyamang Habano
2014 election	Thato Kwerepe
2019 election	Caterpillar Hikuama
2024 election	Phillimon Aaron

== Election results ==
=== 2024 election ===
General election 2024: Ngami
Party	Candidate	Votes	%	±%
BCP	Phillimon Aaron	5,877	59.54	N/A
BDP	Kavis Kario	3,622	36.70	−9.08
BPF	Joseph Matensa	188	3.76	N/A
Margin of victory		2,255	22.84	N/A
Total valid votes		9,870	97.01	−2.95
Rejected ballots		304	2.99	+2.95
Turnout		10,174	84.38	+1.24
Registered electors		12,058		
BCP win (new boundaries)				

=== 2019 election ===
General election 2019: Ngami
Party	Candidate	Votes	%	±%
UDC	Caterpillar Hikuama	8,026	47.83	−4.70
BDP	Thato Kwerepe	7,682	45.78	−1.69
AP	Ndobano Lokae	560	3.34	N/A
BPF	Lekopanye Ledimo	514	3.06	N/A
Margin of victory		344	2.05	N/A
Total valid votes		16,782	99.96	+1.12
Rejected ballots		7	0.04	−1.12
Turnout		16,789	83.14	+0.23
Registered electors		20,193		
UDC gain from BDP		Swing	−1.51	

=== 2014 election ===
General election 2014: Ngami
Party	Candidate	Votes	%	±%
BDP	Thato Kwerepe	7,063	47.47	+0.96
BCP	Goyamang Habano	7,015	47.14	−1.29
UDC	Kebinang Moenga	215	5.39	+1.89
Margin of victory		48	0.33	N/A
Total valid votes		14,880	98.84	+1.02
Rejected ballots		175	1.16	−1.02
Turnout		15,055	82.91	+5.66
Registered electors		18,159		
BDP gain from BCP		Swing	+1.13	

=== 2009 election ===
General election 2009: Ngami
Party	Candidate	Votes	%	±%
BAM	Goyamang Habano	6,836	48.43	+14.54
BDP	Jacob Nkate	6,565	46.51	+0.80
BNF	Molatedi Molato	494	3.50	N/A
Independent	Diile Boikobo	219	1.55	
Margin of victory		271	1.92	N/A
Total valid votes		14,114	97.82	+0.12
Rejected ballots		315	2.18	−0.12
Turnout		10,851	77.25	−3.11
Registered electors		18,679		
BAM gain from BDP		Swing	+7.67	

=== 2004 election ===
General election 2004: Ngami
Party	Candidate	Votes	%	±%
BDP	Jacob Nkate	5,291	45.71	−16.08
BAM	Goyamang Habano	3,922	33.89	+3.89
BCP	Geoffrey Ketjimambo	2,361	20.40	+16.11
Margin of victory		433	7.67	−24.12
Total valid votes		11,574	97.70	+0.92
Rejected ballots		272	2.30	−0.92
Turnout		11,846	80.36	−0.18
Registered electors		14,741		
BDP hold		Swing	−9.99	

=== 1999 election ===
General election 1999: Ngami
Party	Candidate	Votes	%	±%
BDP	Jacob Nkate	5,127	61.79	+4.00
BAM	Letlhogile Setlhoko	2,489	30.00	N/A
BCP	P. Mbaeva	356	4.29	N/A
BNF	G. P. Kadira	326	3.93	N/A
Margin of victory		2,638	31.79	+16.21
Total valid votes		8,298	96.78	N/A
Rejected ballots		276	3.22	N/A
Turnout		8,574	80.54	+10.66
Registered electors		10,664		
BDP hold		Swing	N/A	

=== 1994 election ===
General election 1994: Ngami
Party	Candidate	Votes	%	±%
BDP	Jacob Nkate	2,964	57.79	−2.47
IFP	Letlhogile Setlhoko	2,165	42.21	N/A
Margin of victory		799	15.58	−10.94
Turnout		5,129	69.88	+9.03
Registered electors		7,340		
BDP hold		Swing	N/A	

=== 1989 election ===
General election 1989: Ngami
Party	Candidate	Votes	%	±%
BDP	Gaerolwe Kwerepe	3,244	60.26	+0.01
BIP	Letlhogile Setlhoko	1,826	33.74	−6.01
BNF	Reuben Ndjakarana	323	6.00	N/A
Margin of victory		1,418	26.52	+6.02
Turnout		5,383	60.85	−14.99
Registered electors		8,847		
BDP hold		Swing	+3.01	

=== 1984 election ===
General election 1984: Ngami
Party	Candidate	Votes	%	±%
BDP	Gaerolwe Kwerepe	3,447	60.25	+2.67
BIP	Motlapele Dikole	2,274	39.75	−2.67
Margin of victory		1,173	20.50	+5.34
Turnout		5,722	75.84	+13.73
Registered electors		7,545		
BDP hold		Swing	+2.67	

=== 1979 election ===
General election 1979: Ngami
Party	Candidate	Votes	%	±%
BDP	Gaerolwe Kwerepe	2,210	57.58	−15.22
BIP	Motlapele Dikole	1,628	42.42	+15.22
Margin of victory		582	15.16	−30.44
Turnout		1,698	62.11	+27.58
Registered electors		6,179		
BDP hold		Swing	−15.22	

=== 1974 election ===
General election 1974: Ngami
Party	Candidate	Votes	%	±%
BDP	Gaerolwe Kwerepe	1,223	72.80	+11.75
BIP	L. Kgosintwa	457	27.20	−11.75
Margin of victory		766	45.60	+23.50
Turnout		3,838	34.53	−14.71
Registered electors		4,917		
BDP hold		Swing	+11.75	

=== 1969 election ===
General election 1969: Ngami
Party	Candidate	Votes	%	±%
BDP	Gaerolwe Kwerepe	1,022	61.05	−36.39
BIP	J. Gugushe	652	38.95	N/A
Margin of victory		370	22.10	N/A
Turnout		1,674	49.24	N/A
Registered electors		3,400		
BDP hold		Swing	−37.67	

=== 1965 election ===
General election 1965: Ngami
Party	Candidate	Votes	%
BDP	Gaerolwe Kwerepe	2,054	97.44
BPP	L. M. Mgagani	54	2.56
Margin of victory		2,000	94.88
Turnout		2,108	N/A
Registered electors		N/A	
BDP win (new seat)			
