= Okavango West =

Parliamentary constituency in the North-West District Botswana, 2024 onwards

- Single-member constituency for the National Assembly
- District: North-West
- Population: 26,716
- Major settlements: Shakawe
- Area: 10,569 km^{2}

Current constituency
- Created: 2024
- Party: BCP
- Created from: Okavango
- MP: Kenny Kapinga
- Margin of victory: 1,049 (11.1 pp)

Okavango West is a constituency in the North-West District represented in the National Assembly of Botswana. Further to the completion of the 2022 Delimitation of Parliamentary constituencies, the seat was first contested at the 2024 general election and has been represented by Kenny Kapinga of the Botswana Congress Party since.

== Constituency profile ==
The seat is predominantly rural and encompasses the following localities:

1. Etsha 13
2. Ikoga
3. Sepopa
4. Nxamasere
5. Shakawe
6. Samochema
7. Gani
8. Tsodilo
9. Nxauxau
10. Chukumuchu
11. Kajaja
12. Jao

== Members of Parliament ==
Key: BCP

Election	Winner
2024 election	Kenny Kapinga

== Election results ==
=== 2024 election ===
General election 2024: Okavango West
Party	Candidate	Votes	%
BCP	Kenny Kapinga	5,016	53.12
BDP	Sekwaya Pikinini	3,967	42.01
BPF	Tshenolo Kandonda	460	4.87
Margin of victory		1,049	11.11
Total valid votes		9,443	99.07
Rejected ballots		89	0.93
Turnout		9,522	78.97
Registered electors		12,058	
BCP win (new seat)			
