= Okavango East =

Parliamentary constituency in the North-West District Botswana, 2024 onwards

- Single-member constituency for the National Assembly
- District: North-West
- Population: 21,412
- Major settlements: Seronga
- Area: 14,065 km^{2}

Current constituency
- Created: 2024
- Party: BCP
- Created from: Okavango
- MP: Gabatsholwe Disho
- Margin of victory: 795 (9.3 pp)

Okavango East is a constituency in the North-West represented in the National Assembly of Botswana. Further to the completion of the 2022 Delimitation of Parliamentary constituencies, the seat was first contested at the 2024 general election and has been represented by Gabatsholwe Disho of the Botswana Congress Party since.

== Constituency profile ==
The seat is predominantly rural and encompasses the following localities:

1. Gudigwa
2. Beetsha
3. Seronga
4. Xakao
5. Mohembo
6. Kauxwi
7. Tovera
8. Sekondomboro
9. Ngarange
10. Mogotlho
11. Gunotsoga
12. Eretsha

== Members of Parliament ==
Key: BCP

Election	Winner
2024 election	Gabatsholwe Disho

== Election results ==
=== 2024 election ===
General election 2024: Okavango East
Party	Candidate	Votes	%
BCP	Gabatsholwe Disho	4,267	50.11
BDP	Bagalatia Arone	3,472	40.77
BPF	Kelentshitse Tsima	777	9.12
Margin of victory		795	9.34
Total valid votes		8,516	99.14
Rejected ballots		74	0.86
Turnout		8,590	84.77
Registered electors		10,133	
BCP win (new seat)			
