= Xaxa =

Xaxa may refer to:

== Places ==
- Xaxa, Botswana, a village in Botswana
- Xaxa, Tibet, a village in Tibet

== People ==
- Xaxá (1951–2026), full name Maximiliano Rodrigues Lopes, Brazilian footballer
- Pyari Xaxa (born 1997), Indian footballer
