= Nokaneng =

Village in Botswana

Coordinates: 19°39′50″S 22°11′30″E

Nokaneng

Nokaneng is a village in North-West District, Botswana. It is located close to the Okavango Delta, and is served by Nokaneng Airport. The population of Nokaneng was 2510 in 2021 census.

== The people ==
The people therein are the Bayei, Basarwa and the Baherero though of late there has been a significant increase in the numbers of settlers such as the Bahambukushu. This is a group that predominantly stays along the Okavango Delta. Nokaneng Windhoek, the Namibian capital, is not far but due to poor road conditions leading to the border it is not a popular route. You can get through from Nokaneng to Tsumkwe at the Dobe Border Post. About 5 hours from Tsodilo to Dobe. Dobe to Tsumkwe is 1 hour. You can stay at Tsumkwe Lodge. Road conditions from [Nokaneng to Tsumkwe are variable. The border post at Dobe, 53 km east of Tsumkwe, is now open 7 days a week (7h30 to 16h30 Namibian/Botswana time) and provides a thoroughfare to Botswana. The 4x4 track to Nokaneng is about 140 km. The average speed one can maintain on this road will range 50–80 km/h. The nearest fuel would be 37 km north of Nokaneng at Gumare or at Maun. This is the most recommended route to get to this lodge.

At this stage, fuel is not available in Nokaneng but there are two shops with very basic supplies, a local police station, a school, two pubs/bars, a bottle store, three churches, a clinic. There is also the artificial insemination center where people take their cows for breeding and proper nurturing. The lodges and camping sites are within the Buffalo fence or the restricted areas and most of them are controlled from Maun.

Nokaneng is also a former capital of Ngamiland. It was where the Batawana moved their capital from Toteng. This then makes Nokaneng one of the most villages alongside Toteng and Tsau.

Most of the South African bound mine workers were collected from Nokaneng en route to Johannesburg. The Basarwa/San living in Nokaneng lead a normal life as compared to those living in the Central Kalahari Game Reserve. This is mainly due to the relationship they mostly have had with the Bayei, the dominant group in the village. They have a very understanding relationship and regard each other as cousins. Nokaneng is also a gateway to the world-famous Drosky Hills, or as they call them, the qhwihaba hills.

From Maun, now the capital of Ngamiland, Nokaneng is about 200 km by road and about 200 from Shakawe. It has also been realised that the majority of people residing in Maun trace their roots to Nokaneng, especially those residing in the Botshabelo, Boseja and Thito wards of Maun.
