= Etsha =

Area of villages in the Ngamiland West sub-district of Botswana

Coordinates: 19°06′47″S 22°17′48″E

Etsha is an area of villages in the Ngamiland West sub-district of Botswana. Refugees from the 1969 war in Angola were resettled in the area and formed 13 villages numbered Etsha 1 to Etsha 13. A resettlement study was published about it in the 1970s. A study of basketmakers in Etsha was published in 1984. The development of commercial craft industries have been targeted in the community, including palm-frond weaving.

== Villages ==
- Etsha 6
- Etsha 13
