= Charles Kakomee-Tjeja =

- Born: Kareng, Botswana
- Education: Molepolole Teaching College
- Known for: Scrap metal sculpture
- Movement: Contemporary African art

Charles Kakomee-Tjeja (born 1984) is a Motswana sculptor and visual artist originally from Kareng, Botswana, best known for transforming discarded scrap metal into large-scale sculptures. He is described as one of the country's most innovative contemporary artists. He is also a poet, photographer, actor, comic book artist, production designer, and corporate emcee.

== Early life and education ==
Kakomee-Tjeja was born and raised in Kareng, Botswana. His interest in art was sparked at an early age by his father, a skilled woodcarver, welder, and metal fabricator. His experiences of regularly watching his father working with raw materials, left a lasting impression on his creative development.

He earned a Diploma in Secondary Education at Molepolole Teaching College, with a focus on art and music. Following graduation, he worked for several years as a secondary school art teacher.

== Career ==
After several years in the classroom, Kakomee-Tjeja decided to pursue art full-time. Working primarily with scrap metal, including discarded automotive parts, he uses arc welding as his main technique to construct intricate, large-scale sculptures. He says he wants other people to see that things of value can be created from waste.

Among his works is the Camera Series, a collection of oversized camera sculptures crafted from scrap metal and automotive components. The series is a commentary on contemporary society's relationship with image-making, social media, and the commodification of experience. Multiple pieces from the series have been sold and have attracted significant attention at exhibitions.

Another series is Mukaa Kotjitenda (loosely translated as "a woman of metal" or "one who is married to metal"), a collection of life-sized sculptures depicting women in traditional ovaHerero and ovaMbanderu attire. The series honours the resilience of African women and serves as a tribute to the Herero and Mbanderu communities who survived the early twentieth-century genocide carried out by German colonial forces in what is now Namibia. One of these sculptures, weighing 35 kilograms, was exhibited at the 2024 Makgadikgadi Epic and listed for sale at P15,000.

He also created Kahirona, a sculpture of a cow that celebrates the animal as a symbol of wealth and economic foundation across African communities.

== Public engagement and recognition ==
Kakomee-Tjeja has participated in several prominent exhibitions and competitions. He has competed in President's Day competitions, earning recognition at both regional and national levels. In 2024, he achieved first-place results across multiple categories, including sculpture, poetry, and photography, at the National Arts Festival held in Ghanzi.

He exhibited at the 2024 Makgadikgadi Epic, where his sculptures were among the primary attractions in a dedicated visual arts space spanning approximately one kilometre. The event brought him international attention, with interest from clients in Namibia and the Netherlands. His profile also grew following a post by CEDA ambassador Sonny Serite, who publicly shared his acquisition of one of Kakomee-Tjeja's camera sculptures, drawing wider public attention to the artist's work.

His work has been featured in several Botswana media outlets including the Daily News and the Botswana Guardian. He has expressed a long-term vision of establishing a public sculpture park and fostering a large-scale artistic movement across Botswana's major cities.
