= Dumadumana =

Ledumadumane Ledumadumane
- Ledumadumane in Botswana
- Coordinates: 24.577383°S 25.865173°E
- Country: Botswana
- District: Gaborone
- Sub-district: Gaborone
- Time zone: UTC+2 (Central Africa Time)
  - Summer (DST): UTC+2 (not observed)

Ledumadumane is a village in Botswana, located about 10 km (6.2 mi) northwest of Gaborone, the capital of Botswana.
