= Tsau =

Tsau may refer to:

- Tsao, Botswana, a village in North-West District of Botswana
- Tsau, a Mars crater, named after the Botswana village
- Tashkent State Agrarian University (TSAO)
- The Sky Above Us with James Albury, a series about astronomy
