= Etsha 6, Botswana =

Etsha 6
- Village
- Location within Botswana
- Coordinates: 19°06′47″S 22°17′48″E
- Country: Botswana
- District: North-West
- Sub-district: Ngamiland West

Population (2001)
  - Total: 5,613
- Time zone: UTC+2 (CAT)

Etsha 6 is a village in Ngamiland West sub-district of North-West District, Botswana. The population was 5,613 in the 2001 census.
