= Komana =

Coordinates: 20°11′48″S 23°13′23″E

Location of Komana

Komana is a village in North-West District of Botswana. It is located close to the Okavango Delta and Lake Ngami. The population was 186 in 2001 census.
