= List of districts of Botswana by Human Development Index =

This is a list of districts of Botswana by Human Development Index as of 2023.

Rank	District	HDI (2023)
Very high human development
1	South-East (including Gaborone)	0.812
High human development
2	North-East	0.749
3	Kgatleng	0.745
–	Botswana	0.731
4	Kweneng	0.715
5	Southern	0.714
6	Central	0.708
7	Chobe	0.708
Medium human development
8	Kgalagadi	0.699
9	North-West	0.696
10	Ghanzi	0.681
