= Nokaneng Airport =

Airport in Botswana

- IATA: none; ICAO: FBNN

Summary
- Operator: Civil Aviation Authority of Botswana
- Serves: Nokaneng, Botswana
- Elevation AMSL: 3,145 ft (959 m)
- Coordinates: 19°40′50″S 22°11′57″E

Map
- Location of airport in Botswana

Runways
Direction	Length		Surface
Direction	m	ft	Surface
04/22	840	2,756	Grass
- Source: GCM Google Maps

Nokaneng Airport (ICAO: FBNN) is an airport serving the village of Nokaneng on the western edge of the Okavango Delta in Botswana. The runway is 2 kilometres (1.2 mi) southeast of the village.

== See also ==
- Transport in Botswana
- List of airports in Botswana
