= Botlhatlogo =

Coordinates: 20°35′42″S 22°42′12″E

Location of Botlhatlogo

Botlhatlogo is a village in North-West District of Botswana. It is located in the southern part of the district, close to the Okavango Delta and Lake Ngami, and has a primary school. The population was 467 in 2001 censusand was 705 in the 2022 census.
