= Parakarungu =

Coordinates: 18°2′7″S 24°19′27″E

Location of Parakarungu

Parakarungu is a village in North-West District of Botswana. It is located in the eastern part of the district, which before 2001 formed Chobe District. It has a primary school, and the population was 806 in 2001 census.

Correction. Parakarungu is a village in Chobe District. It is located in the western part of Chobe District. The village used to be part of the then North West District before the creation of Chobe District in 2000/2001.
