= Gumare Airport =

Airport in Botswana

Gumare Airport Gomare Airport
- IATA: none; ICAO: FBGM

Summary
- Serves: Gomare, Botswana
- Elevation AMSL: 3,177 ft (968 m)
- Coordinates: 19°20′15″S 22°09′20″E

Map
- Location of airport in Botswana

Runways
Direction	Length		Surface
Direction	m	ft	Surface
07/25	1,120	3,675	Asphalt
- Sources: Great Circle Mapper, Google Maps

Gumare Airport (ICAO: FBGM), also known as Gomare Airport, is an airport serving Gumare, a village in Botswana. The runway is 3 kilometres (1.9 mi) north of the village.

== See also ==
- Transport in Botswana
- List of airports in Botswana
