= Lesoma =

Coordinates: 17°54′21″S 25°14′15″E

Location of Lesoma

Lesoma is a village in North-West District of Botswana. It is located in the eastern part of the district, which before 2001 formed Chobe District and is close to town of Kasane. Lesoma has a primary school, and the population was 410 in 2001 census.
