= Bodibeng =

Village in Botswana

- Village
- Location within Botswana
- Coordinates: 20.62712275460°S 22.60316062572°E
- Country: Botswana
- District: North-West

Population (2001)
  - Total: 472
- Time zone: UTC+2:00 (CAT)

Bodibeng is a village in North-West District of Botswana. It is located in the southern part of the district, close to the Okavango Delta and Lake Ngami, and has a primary school. The population was 472 in 2001 census. It is located in Ngamiland.
