= Kgope =

- Village
- Location in Botswana
- Coordinates: 24°18′37″S 25°54′53″E
- Country: Botswana
- District: Kweneng District

Population (2001)
  - Total: 507

Kgope is a village in Kweneng District of Botswana. The village is located 50 km north of Gaborone, the capital of Botswana, and it has a primary school. The population of Kgope was 507 in 2001 census.
