= Semboyo =

Coordinates: 20°16′46″S 22°27′30″E

Location of Semboyo

Semboyo is a village in North-West District of Botswana. It is located in the southern part of the district, close to the Okavango Delta and Lake Ngami, and has a primary school. The population was 246 in 2001 census.
