= Gakgatla =

- Village
- Location in Botswana
- Coordinates: 24°32′43″S 25°36′56″E
- Country: Botswana
- District: Kweneng District

Population (2001)
  - Total: 211

Gakgatla is a village in Kweneng District of Botswana. The village is located around 40 km north-west of the capital of Botswana, Gaborone. The population of Gakgatla was 211 in 2001 census.

The headman of Arbitration is Lenyetse Moshapa.
