= Gaerolwe Kwerepe =

Motswana politician (1928–2018)

Gaerolwe M. Kwerepe (1928–2018) was a Motswana politician. He was the Member of Parliament for the Ngami constituency from 1965 to 1994 with the Botswana Democratic Party.

== Biography ==
Gaerolwe M. Kwerepe was born in Maun, Botswana, in 1928. Kwerepe was elected to represent the Ngami constituency in the 1st Parliament of Botswana for the Botswana Democratic Party in 1965. Kwerepe lost reelection in 1994 to Jacob Nkate. Kwerepe's son Thato Kwerepe went into politics, and he went on to challenge Nkate for the Ngami constituency in 2009. Kwerepe died on 16 February 2018 at Letsholathebe II Memorial Hospital.
