= Toteng =

Coordinates: 20°21′30″S 22°57′21″E

Toteng (Botswana)

Toteng is a village in the north west of Botswana, Ngamiland. The town is the location of the oldest "directly dated evidence of cattle in southern Africa". Nearby towns are Sehithwa and Bobideng to the west, Tsau and Gumare to the north and Maun to the northeast.

The village has both a hospital and a school.

In 2012 the Boseto mine, an open-pit copper mine, was opened in Toteng. It closed down in 2015, but is expected to reopen as an underground mine, sometimes known as the Zeta Mine.
