= Shorobe =

Coordinates: 19°45′43″S 23°40′37″E

Location of Shorobe

Shorobe is a village in North-West District of Botswana. It is located close to Okavango Delta. The population was 8031 in 2011 census. Shorobe is a sizeable village which is about 26 km north of the tourism place Maun.

== Wards in Shorobe ==
1. Kgosing Ward
2. Letsebe Ward
3. Sephane Ward
4. Nxabe Ward
5. leretwana ward
6. Mochaba
