= Xaxá =

Brazilian footballer (1951–2026)

Personal information
- Full name: Maximiliano Rodrigues Lopes
- Date of birth: 27 December 1951
- Place of birth: Guarujá, São Paulo, Brazil
- Date of death: 16 September 2026 (aged 74)
- Place of death: Guarujá, São Paulo, Brazil
- Height: 1.62 m (5 ft 4 in)
- Position: Right winger

Youth career
- Brasil AC

Senior career*
Years	Team	Apps	(Gls)
1969	Portuguesa Santista		
1970–1976	Portuguesa	230	(11)
1977–1978	Juventus-SP		
1977	→ Londrina (loan)		
1979	Vasco da Gama		
1979	Uberlândia		
1980	União Rondonópolis		
- * Club domestic league appearances and goals

Maximiliano Rodrigues Lopes (27 December 1951 – 16 September 2026), better known as Xaxá, was a Brazilian professional footballer who played as a right winger.

== Career ==
Xaxá was part of the Portuguesa de Desportos team in the 1970s, winning the state championship in 1973 alongside Santos, the Taça Estado de São Paulo and the Copa Governador in 1976. He made 230 appearances for the club, scoring 11 goals.

== Death ==
Xaxá died on 16 September 2026, at the age of 74.

== Honours ==
Portuguesa

- Campeonato Paulista: 1973
- Taça Estado de São Paulo: 1973
- Copa Governador do Estado de São Paulo: 1976
