= Kauxwhi =

Village in Botswana

- Village
- Interactive map of Kauxwhi
- Coordinates: 18.27803°S 21.84019°E
- Country: Botswana
- District: Ngamiland

Population
  - Total: 1,888

Kauxwhi is a village in Ngamiland, in the northwestern corner of Botswana. In 2022, it had a population of 1888 people in the village, and 2223 people when associated localities are included.

According to the village elders, the village was formally established in 1983. It is located close to the Namibian border and has both primary and secondary schools. The population was 859 in the 2001 census. The village is a residence for Hambukushu, Basarwa and Haxhiriku. The village has a clinic and a tribal court. The headman of records is Mr. Simon Kambango. The village consist of 7 wards which are Mohembo, Gcarikwe, Modubana, Kehemo, Divava, Kaputura and Gowa. The people are mostly arable and pastoral farmers at a small scale.
