= Mabutsane =

Mabutsane Gudas
- Village
- Location in Botswana
- Coordinates: 24°23′13″S 23°34′43″E
- Country: Botswana
- District: Southern District (Botswana)
- Elevation: 1,097 m (3,599 ft)

Population (2011)
  - Total: 2,386
- Time zone: UTC+02:00 (CAT)

Mabutsane is a Botswana village located in the Southern district, subdistrict of Ngwaketse West. According to the 2011 census, the village has 2,386 inhabitants.

== Location ==
In the territory of the village there are the following 23 locations:

- Bokhutlo of 11 inhabitants,
- Bokspan of 12 inhabitants,
- Ditlhako of 11 inhabitants,
- Gasekhukhu ,
- Ghia of 7 inhabitants,
- hantse ,
- Kabana of 3 inhabitants,
- Kenna of 10 inhabitants,
- Khawa ,
- Lokatsane ,
- Lwale ,
- Makalamabedi of 15 inhabitants,
- Marapalalo ,
- Matimela Camp of 4 inhabitants,
- Metlhaba ya Matlatlagwe of 3 inhabitants,
- Metlhabeng ,
- Motlops of 2 inhabitants,
- Nankhwane of 20 inhabitants,
- Nyetse ,
- Palamaokuwe of 19 inhabitants,
- Sekgwannabatho of 4 inhabitants,
- Sekgwasentsho of 7 inhabitants,
- Tlhatswe of 8 inhabitants
