= Phuduhudu, North-West District =

Coordinates: 20°11′43″S 24°32′11″E

Location of Phuduhudu

Phuduhudu is a village in North-West District of Botswana. It is located in the south-eastern part of the district, and has a primary school. The population was 377 in 2001 census.
