= Habu, Botswana =

Village in North-West District, Botswana

Habu
- Village
- Location within Botswana
- Coordinates: 19°50′24″S 22°23′05″E
- Country: Botswana
- District: North-West

Population (2011)
  - Total: 533
- Time zone: UTC+2 (Central Africa Time)

Habu is a village in Botswana, located within the North-West District. It is placed in the central part of the region, close to the Okavango Delta, and has a primary school. In 2011, it had a population of 533 people, and in 2001, a population of 304 people.
