= Matlapana =

Coordinates: 19°54′42″S 23°32′28″E

Location of Matlapana

Matlapana is a village in North-West District of Botswana. It is located north-east of the district capital Maun. The population was 1,169 in 2001 census.
