= Tubu, Botswana =

Coordinates: 19°21′9″S 22°16′55″E

Location of Tubu

Tubu is a village in North-West District of Botswana, 10 kilometers due east of Gumare village. It is located close to the Okavango Delta, it has a primary school, a clinic and electricity. The population was 392 in 2001 census.

It is a gateway to cattle posts and farms for many of the settlers in the area and hence the village sees and increase in population during ploughing season.
