= Sankuyo =

Town in Botswana

Sankuyo Sankoyo
- Sankoyo Primary School
- Interactive map of Sankuyo
- Coordinates: 19°25′42″S 23°52′28″E

Population
  - Total: 372

Sankuyo, also known as Sankoyo, is a small village in North-West District of Botswana. It is located north-east of Okavango Delta and has a primary school. It is also the name of an organisation that runs several lodges in the Okavango Delta. One of these lodges is Santawani.

In 2026, the primary school was donated a digital centre by First Lady Kaone Boko, containing 30 computers and a smart board.

== Demographics ==
The population of the village was 372 in 2001 census. As of 2008, 28% of Sankoyo's population was employed, and the village's income is largely derived from cattle, crop farming, and tourism.
