= Nxaunxau =

Coordinates: 18°58′23″S 21°18′6″E

Location of Nxaunxau

Nxaunxau is a village in North-West District of Botswana. It is located close to Okavango Delta and Namibian border. The population was 330 in 2001 census.
