= Makula =

Makula is a surname. Notable people with the surname include:

- Edward Makula (1930–1996), Polish aviator
- Jerzy Makula (born 1952), Polish aviator
- Joseph Makula (born 1929), Democratic Republic of the Congo photographer
- Stanisław Makula, Polish aviator
- Mantombizana Makula.

== See also ==
- Makula family
