= Moshu =

Red panda

- Species: Red panda
- Sex: Male
- Died: Oregon Zoo, Portland, Oregon, United States

Moshu was a male red panda who lived at the Oregon Zoo in Portland, Oregon. He was born at the Red River Zoo in Fargo, North Dakota on June 20, 2011. He joined the zoo in 2019 and died in 2025.

Previously, Moshu lived at the Nashville Zoo. Moshu lived with another red panda Mei Mei at the Oregon Zoo. The pair were relocated to Oregon as part of the Association of Zoos and Aquariums' Species Survival Plan for red pandas. Mei Mei gave birth to the pair's first cub Pabu in 2020. Mei Mei and Pabu were relocated to ZooMontana in Billings, Montana in 2021 because the male cub was too old to live with Moshu but too young to be without his mother.

Moshu was nicknamed "Sir Snacks-a-lot". In his late years, he was diagnosed with severe cardiovascular disease and he received cold laser therapy for pain management. He also received physical therapy and ramps were added so he could climb more easily. He lived almost fourteen years and fathered four cubs. According to The Oregonian and KOIN, Moshu was a "fan-favorite" of the Oregon Zoo and was popular on the zoo's social media accounts. The zoo's "Moshu Mondays" series had featured close-ups of him. The Oregonian's Zaeem Shaikh said Mosgu "became somewhat of an Oregon celebrity" and noted that U.S. Sen. Ron Wyden had visited him. Artist Mike Bennet, who had painted a wooden cutout inspired by Moshu, shared a photograph of his work on social media and wrote, "Rest easy Moshu".
