= Mababe =

Village in Botswana

Coordinates: 19°10′49″S 23°59′49″E

Location of Mababe

Mababe is a village in North-West District of Botswana. It is located in the eastern part of the district, and has a primary school. The population was 157 in the 2001 census.
