= Gonutsuga =

Village in Botswana

Coordinates: 18°49′46″S 22°17′2″E

Location of Gonutsuga

Gonutsoga, also Gonitsoga, is a village in North-West District of Botswana. It is located close to the western border against Namibia. The population was 506 in 2001 census.
