= Tsao, Botswana =

Village in Botswana

Coordinates: 20°9′54″S 22°27′16″E

Location of Tsao

Tsao or Tsau is a village in North-West District of Botswana. It is located close to the Okavango Delta and Lake Ngami. The population was 1,290 in 2001 census.
