= Gani =

Gani is both a given name and a surname. Notable people with the name include:

== Given name ==
- Gani Bobi (1943–1995), Albanian philosopher and sociologist
- Gani Fawehinmi (1938–2009), Nigerian writer
- Gani Lawal (born 1988), Nigerian-American basketball player
- Gani Mirzo (born 1968), Kurdish musician
- Gani Zhailauov (born 1985), Kazakhstani boxer

== Surname ==
- Abdelillah Gani (born 1987), Moroccan Paralympic athlete
- Adnan Kapau Gani (1905–1968), Indonesian politician
- Alhassan Mohammed Gani (1959–2025), Nigerian academic administrator
- Lenin Gani (1967–2013), Bangladeshi journalist
- R. A. Gani, Bangladeshi politician
- Sakibul Gani, Indian cricketer
