= Kareng =

Coordinates: 20°37′37″S 22°19′42″E

Location of Kareng

Kareng is a village in North-West District of Botswana. It is located close to Okavango Delta, and has a primary school. The population was 599 in 2001 census.
