= Ngarange =

Coordinates: 18°23′46″S 22°00′18″E

Location of Ngarange

Ngarangi is a village in North-West District of Botswana. It is located along the Okavango River, close to the Namibian border. The population was 948 in 2001 census.
