= Xakao =

Coordinates: 18°18′27″S 21°53′22″E

Location of Xakao

Xakao is a village in North-West District of Botswana. It is located close to the Namibian border, where the river Okavango enters Botswana. The population was 1,594 in 2022 census.
