= Beetsha =

Coordinates: 18°43′08″S 22°45′48″E

Location of Beetsha

Beetsha is a village in North-West District of Botswana. It is located north of the Okavango River and close to Okavango Delta.

== Demographics ==
The population was 760 in 2001 census.
