= Qangwa =

Coordinates: 19°31′40″S 21°10′32″E

Location of Qangwa

Qangwa is a village in North-West District of Botswana. It is located close to the western border against Namibia, and has a primary school and a health clinic. The population was 337 in 2001 census.
