= Sepopa =

Village in northwestern Botswana

Coordinates: 18°45′S 22°11′E

Location of Sepopa

Sepopa is a village in North-West District of Botswana. It is located close to the beginning of the Okavango Delta. The population was 1,519 at the 2001 census.
