= Nxamasere =

Village in Botswana

Coordinates: 18°36′S 22°04′E

Location of Nxamasere

Nxamasere is a village in North-West District of Botswana. It is located along the Okavango river, close to the Okavango Delta panhandle, and has a local airstrip and tarred road. The Maun-Shakawe road also known as A35 passes through the village. The village consists of different cultures which are Khoisan, Herero, Yeyi, Hambukushu and Kgalagadi.

"Nxamasere" is the San word used to describe the sound the wind makes when it blows through the reeds. The area has strong traditional links to the San people of Botswana as the Nxamasere channel is unique in that its ancient course flowed past the mystical Tsodilo Hills, a site sacred to the San people. The Nxamasere community has a strong San influence in its culture and appearance.

The population of the village was 1,584 in 2011 housing and population census. The village has got a primary school, pre school, couple of shops (butchery, bakery, the main shop), tuck shops, a local bar and a clinic. The village is also home to one of the oldest lodges in the Okavango Region, by the name of Nxamaseri Fishing Lodge.
