= Sub-districts of Botswana =

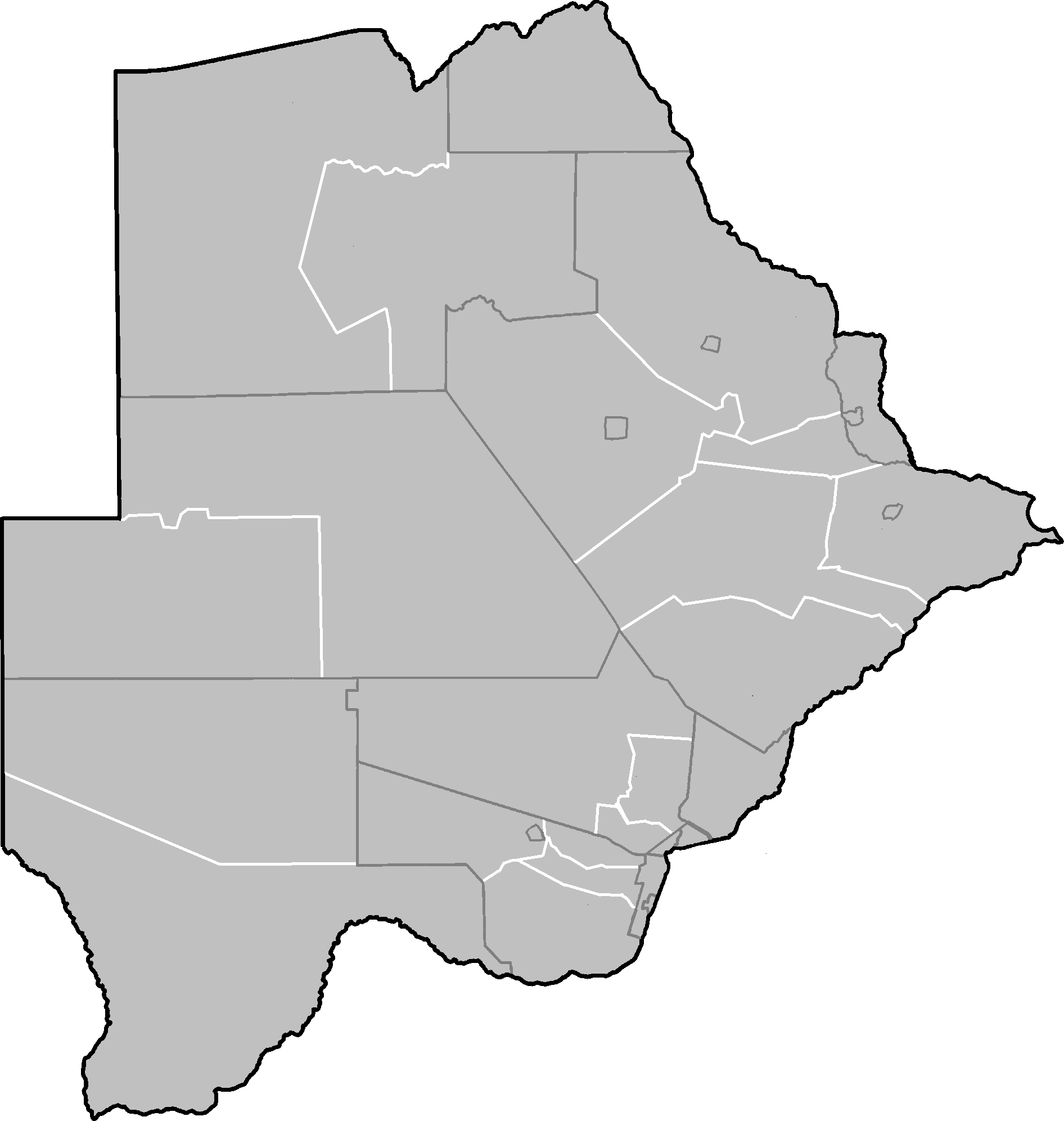
Map of the Subdistricts of Botswana

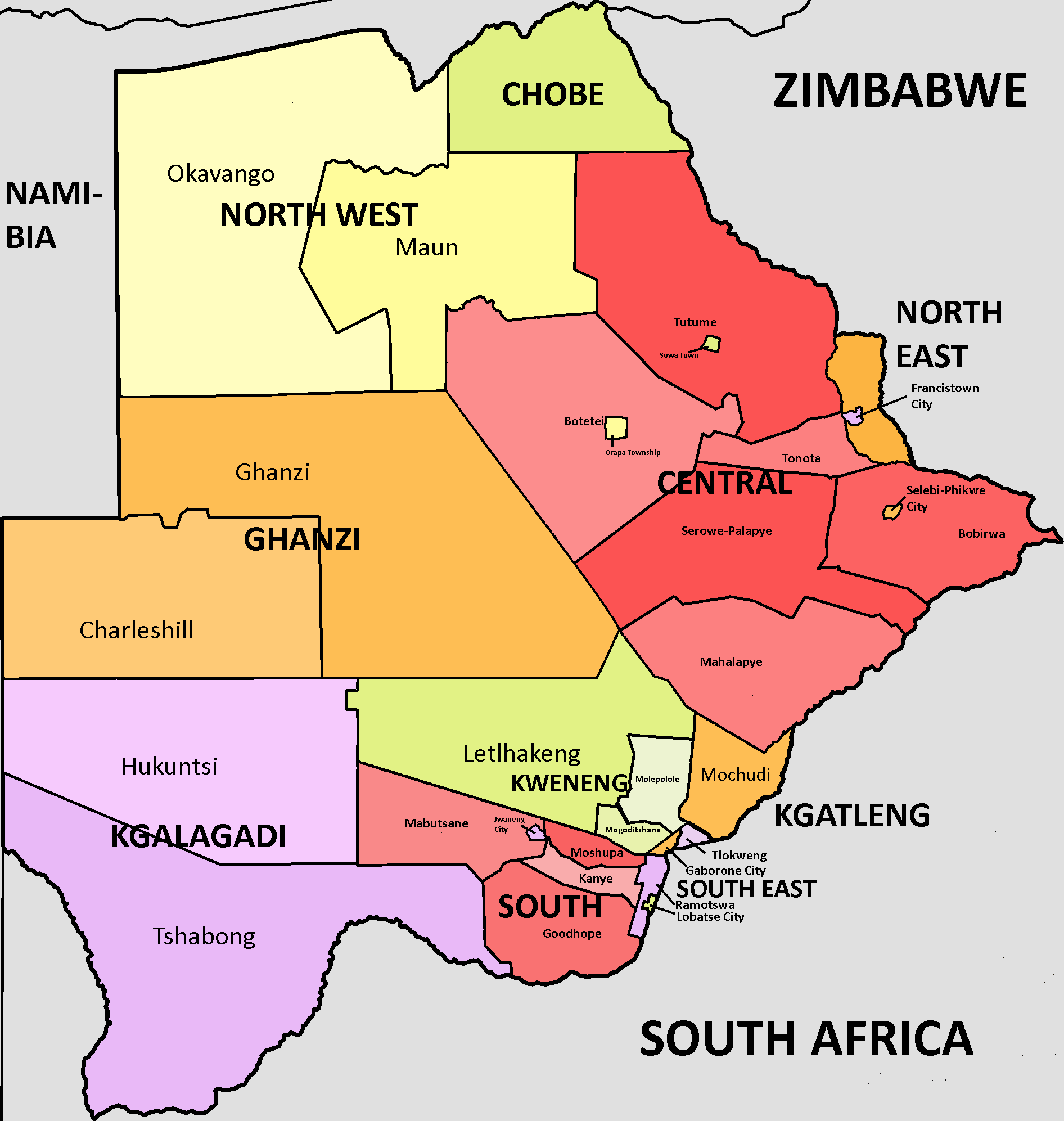

The districts of Botswana are subdivided into sub-districts. The sub-districts are listed below, by district:

As of 2017, the sub-districts of Botswana have changed to a number of 23. This was a result of the National Development Plan of April 2017 – March 2023.

All of the separate town councils consist of no sub-districts.

== Central District ==
- Bobirwa
- Boteti
- Mahalapye
- Serowe - Palapye
- Tutume
- Tonota

== Chobe District ==
N/A

== Ghanzi District ==
- Charleshill
- Ghanzi

== Kgalagadi District ==
- Hukuntsi
- Tsabong

== Kgatleng District ==
- Mochudi

== Kweneng District ==
- Letlhakeng
- Mogoditshane
- Molepolole

== North-East District ==
N/A

== North-West District/Ngamiland District ==
- Okavango
- Maun

== South-East District ==
- Ramotswa
- Tlokweng

== Southern District ==
- Goodhope
- Kanye
- Mabutsane
- Moshupa

== See also ==
- Districts of Botswana
