= Seronga =

Village in North-West district, Botswana

Coordinates: 18°48′46″S 22°24′59″E

Seronga

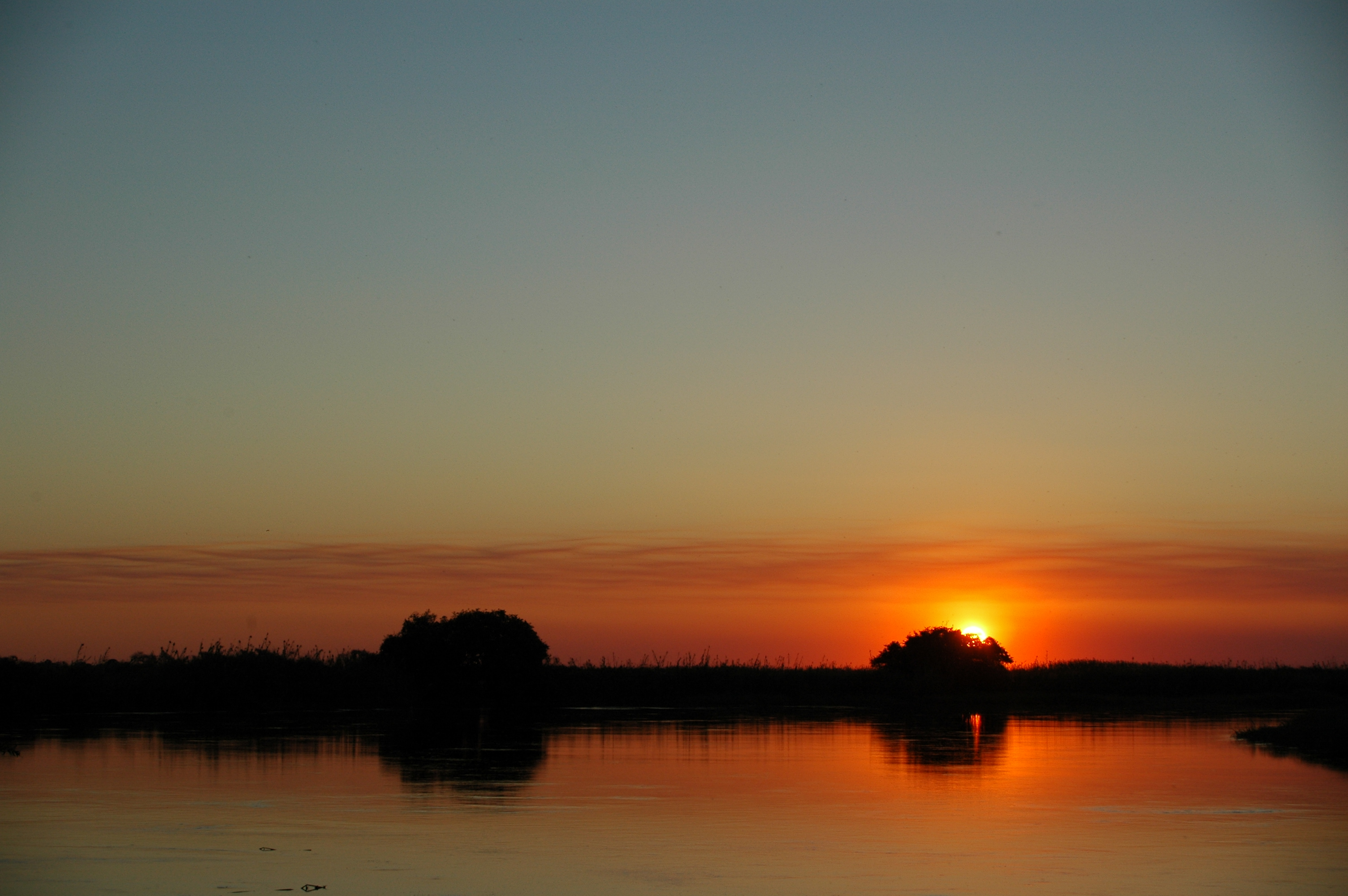
Seronga sunsets

Seronga is a village in North-West District, Botswana. It is located close to beginning of the Okavango Delta, and has a local airstrip.

In 2001, the population of Seronga was 1,641. In 2011, the village had a population of 2,574, while Seronga and its associated localities had a combined population of 3,716. According to the 2022 Botswana Population and Housing Census, Seronga village had a population of 2,793, while Seronga and its associated localities had 3,306 inhabitants.
