= Ikoga =

Village in North-West District, Botswana

Coordinates: 18°51′58″S 22°17′6″E

Location of Ikoga

Ikoga is a village in North-West District of Botswana. It is located close to Okavango Delta and has a primary school. The population was 699 in 2001 census.
