= Xaxa, Botswana =

Coordinates: 19°52′58″S 21°4′50″E

Location of Xaxa

Xaxa is a village in North-West District of Botswana. It is close to the Namibian border.

== Population ==
The population was 280 in 2001 census.
