= North-West District (Botswana) =

Ngamiland
- District
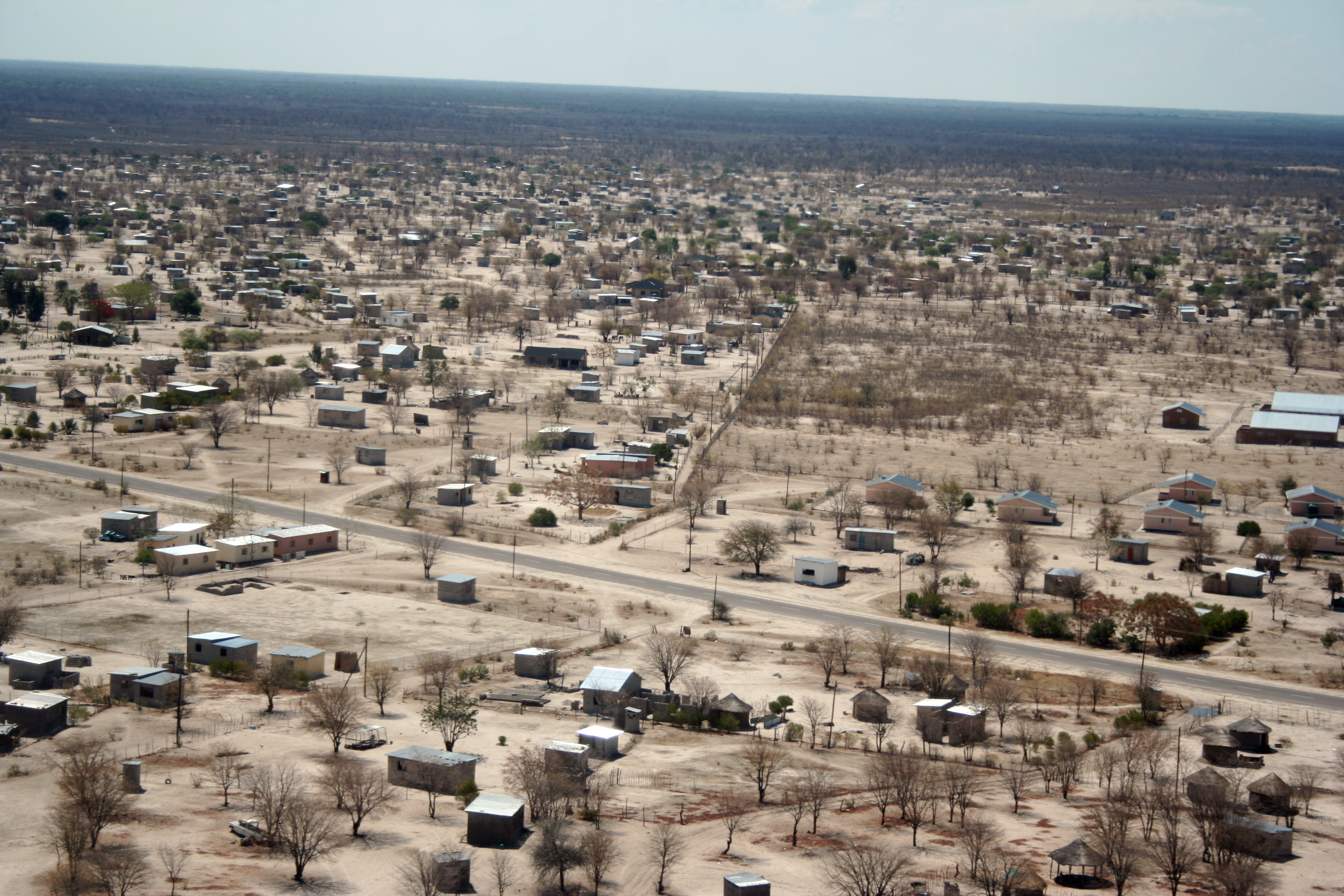
- Maun

- Location within Botswana
- Coordinates: 19°30′S 23°30′E
- Country: Botswana
- Capital: Maun

Area
  - Total: 129,930 km^{2} (50,170 sq mi)

Population (2022 census)
  - Total: 196,574
  - Density: 1.5129/km^{2} (3.9185/sq mi)
- Time zone: UTC+2 (Central Africa Time)
- HDI (2019): 0.697 medium · 9th

The North-West District or Ngamiland is one of the first-level administrative subdivisions of Botswana. For census and administrative purposes Ngamiland is subdivided into Ngamiland East, Ngamiland West and Ngamiland Delta (Okavango). It is governed by a District Commissioner, appointed by the national government, and the elected North-West District Council. The administrative centre is Maun.

As of 2011, the total population of the district was 175,631 compared to 142,970 in 2001. The growth rate of population during the decade was 2.08. The total number of workers constituted 32,471 with 16,852 males and 15,621 females, with a majority of them involved in agriculture.

Maun, the Tsodilo Hills, the Moremi Game Reserve, the Gchwihaba (Drotsky's) Caves, the Aha Hills (on the border with Namibia), the Nhabe Museum in Maun, and Maun Educational Park are the major tourist attractions in the district.

== History ==
In the late 18th century, the Tswana people, primarily herders, began expanding northward into what is now called Ngamiland. Older sources occasionally reference the area with names suggesting a triad, such as Trio Java anglicised, or Tawana, reflecting its historical ties and connections. It later became home to a sub-chiefdom established under Ngwato. Khama III’s recognition of British authority over Ngamiland further consolidated colonial control while ensuring some level of protection for Tswana interests against external threats. Despite this, British administration was slow to reach the region, with officials only arriving in 1894, leading to a period of minimal oversight and reliance on local governance structures. In 1885 when the British established the Bechuanaland Protectorate, the northern boundary was 22° south latitude. On 30 June 1890, the northern boundary of the protectorate was formally extended northward by the British to include Ngamiland, which at the time was still under the Tawana, who by then recognized the authority of Khama III. British officials did not arrive in the Ngamiland region until 1894. Ngamiland was administered as Bechuanaland's northwestern corner and primary contact point with German South West Africa via the Caprivi Strip.

In 1966 the North-West District was established which included both Ngamiland and Chobe; however, in 2006, Chobe District was again separated out.

== Geography ==
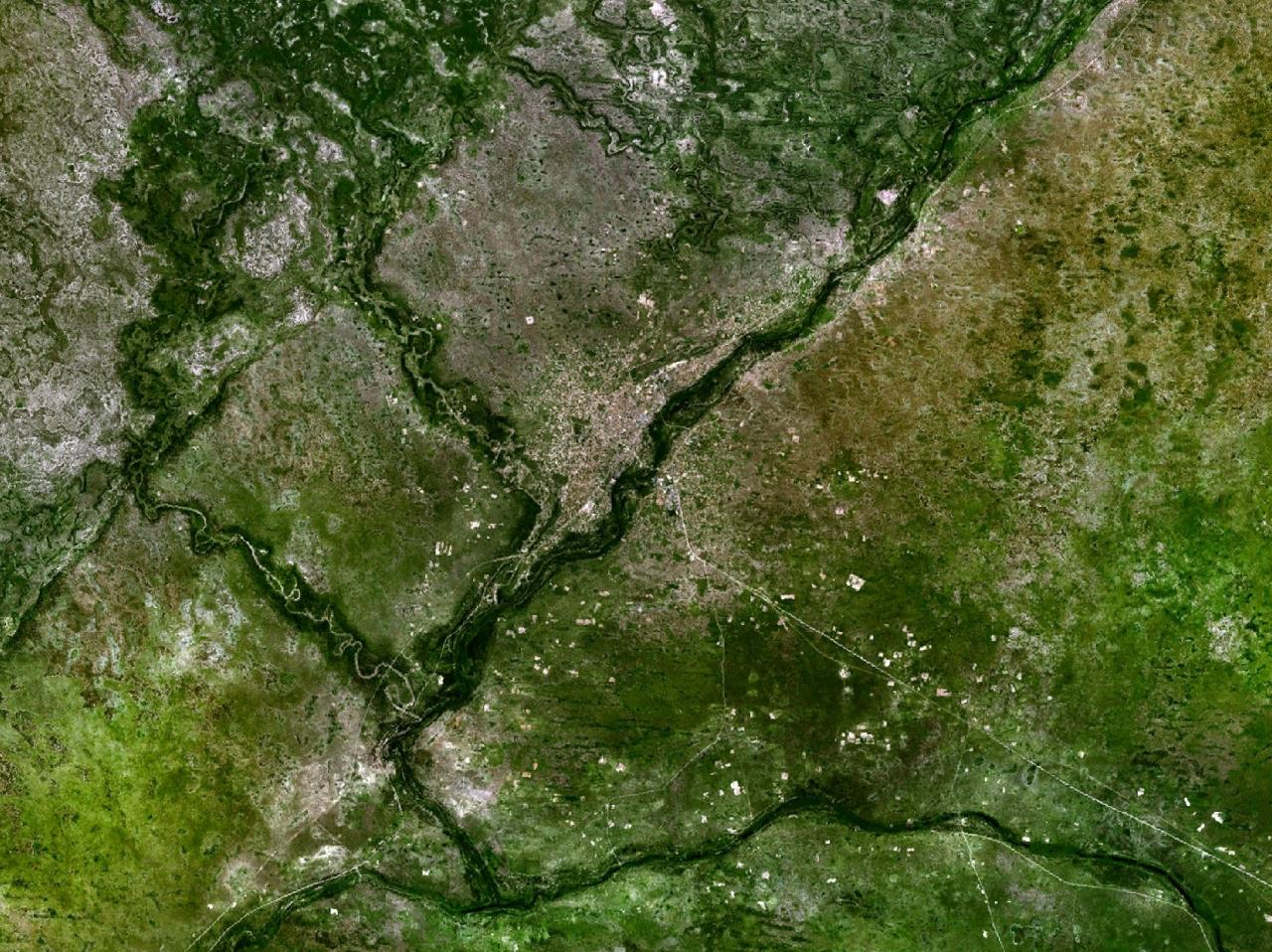
Image of Maun

The region has an average elevation of around 915 m (3,002 ft) above the mean sea level. The vegetation type is Savannah, with tall grasses, bushes and trees. The annual precipitation is around 650 mm (26 in), most of which is received during the summer season from November to May.

North-West District shares its borders with the following foreign areas: Omaheke Region, Namibia in southwest, Otjozondjupa Region, Namibia in the west, Kavango East Region, Namibia in the northwest and Zambezi Region, Namibia in the north. Domestically, it borders Central District in the southeast, Ghanzi District in the southwest and Chobe District in the east.

Like most of Botswana, it consists of partially dissected tablelands, in this case sloping down from the Kaukau Veld that lies to the northwest. This flow and the Okavango River drain into the mostly endorheic Okavango Delta. The delta seasonally overflows into the endorheic Lake Ngami to the south, and into the Thamalakane River which via the Boteti River feeds the Makgadikgadi salt pans to the southeast. Most of the rivers in the region are seasonal, and subject to flash floods. Maun, the Tsodilo Hills, Moremi Game Reserve, Gchwihaba (Drotsky's) Caves, Aha Hills, Nhabe Museum and Maun Educational Park is the major tourist attractions in the district.

== Demographics ==
Historical population
Year	Pop.	±%
1981	75,997	—
1991	108,660	+43.0%
2001	142,970	+31.6%
2011	152,284	+6.5%
2022	196,574	+29.1%

As of 2011, the total population of the district was 175,631 compared to 142,970 in 2001. The growth rate of population during the decade was 2.08. The population in the district was 8.67 per cent of the total population in the country. The sex ratio stood at 95.11 for every 100 males, compared to 93.43 in 2001. The average house hold size was 3.27 in 2011 compared to 4.49 in 2001. There were 5,437 craft and related workers, 2,290 clerks, 8,777 people working in elementary occupation 1,117 Legislators, Administrators & managers 2,974 Plant & machine operators and assemblers, 856 professionals, 5,812 service workers, shop & market sales workers, 2,398 skilled agricultural & related workers 2,069 technicians and associated professionals, making the total work force to 31,915.

== Education and economy ==
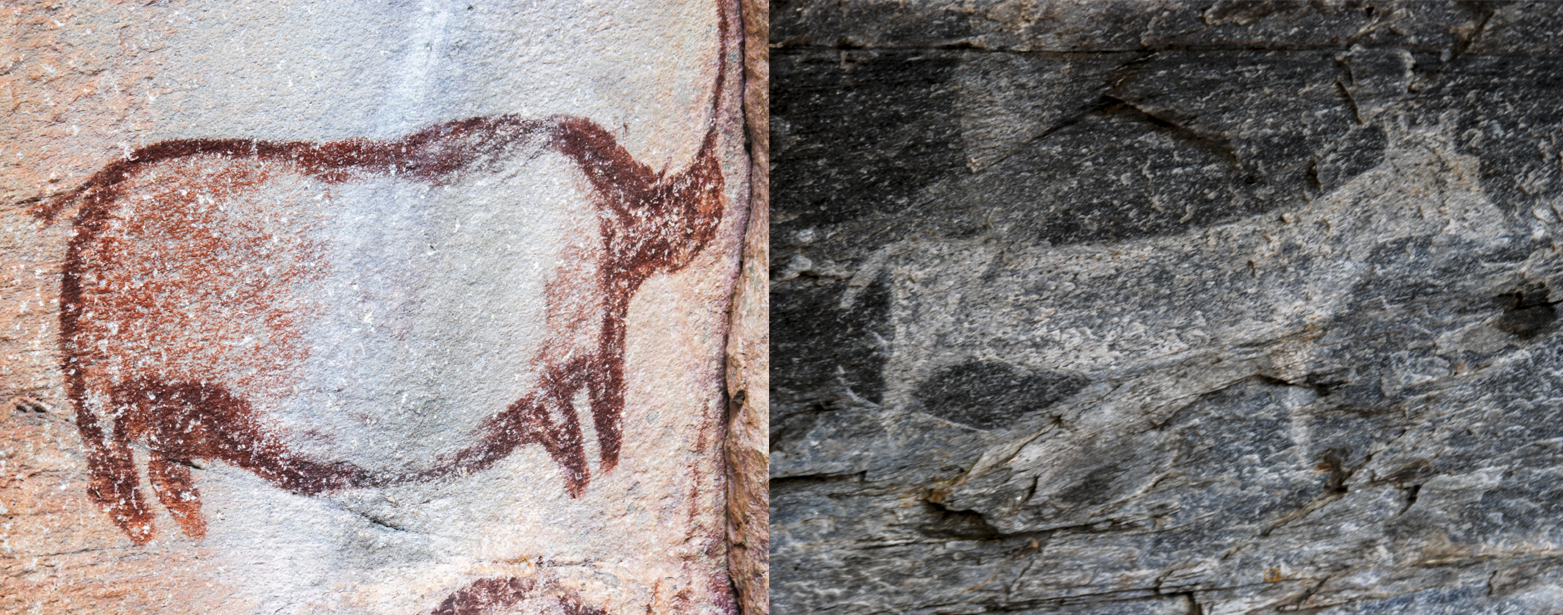
Rock art in Tsodilo hills

As of 2011, there were a total of 071 schools in the district, with 8.30 per cent private schools. The total number of students in the Council schools was 28,101, while it was 940 in private schools. The total number of students enrolled in the district was 29,041: 14,190 girls and 14,851 boys. The total number of qualified teachers was 1,070, 658 female and 412 male. There were around 27 temporary teachers, 13 male and 40 female. There were 6 untrained teachers in the district.

As of 2006, 12,737 were involved in agriculture, 1,131 in construction, 2,090 in education, 177 in electricity and water, 88 in finance, 1,000 in health, 1,144 in hotels and restaurants, 1,450 in manufacturing, 403 in other community services, 1,455 in private households, 4,722 in public administration, 932 in real estate, 730 in transport and communications, and 4,412 in wholesale and retail trade. The total number of workers was 32,471, 16,852 male and 15,621 female.

== Administration ==
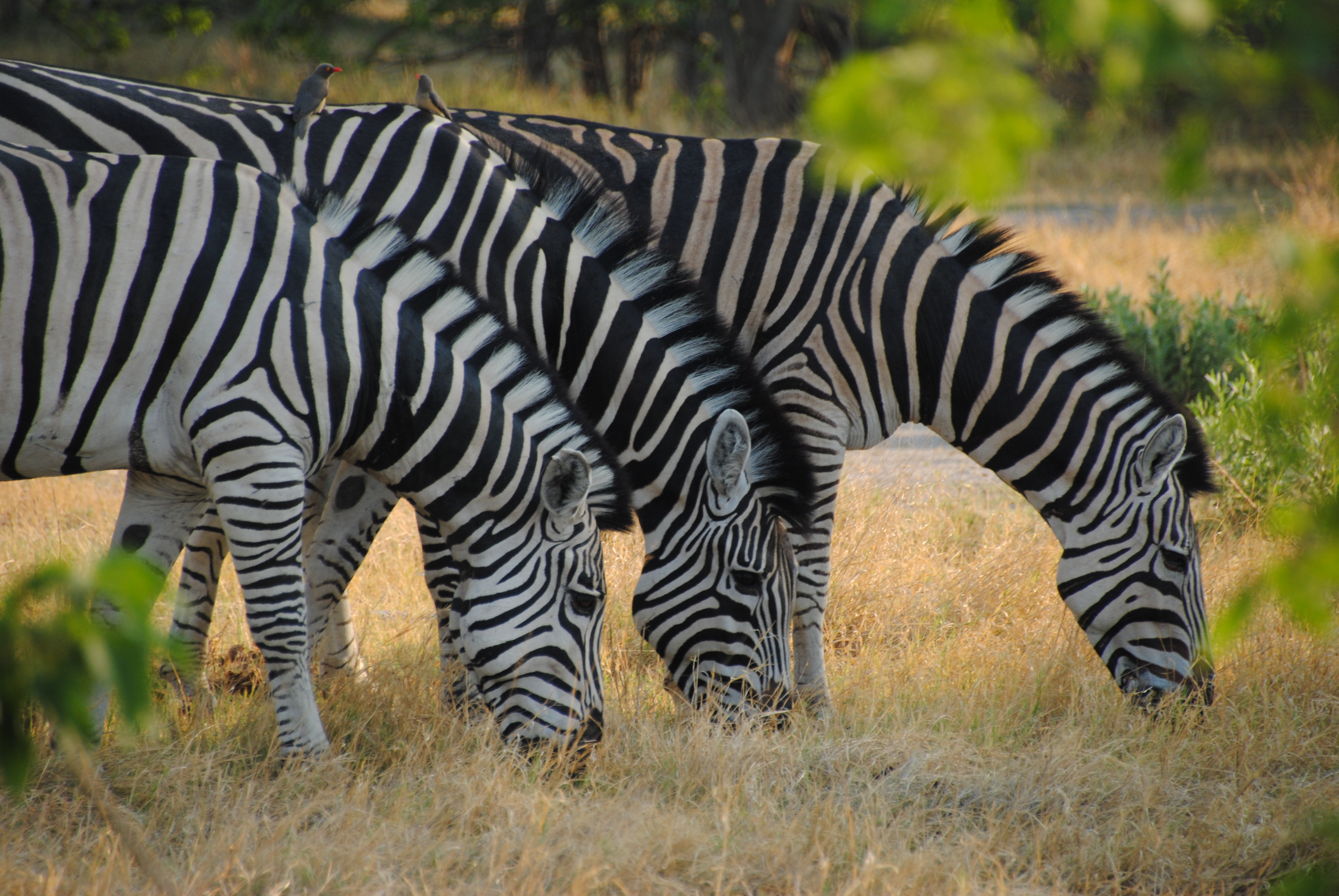
Moremi Game Reserve

By far the largest settlement in the district is Maun, which had a population of over 60,000 in 2011 census. The following is the list of villages noted separately in the 2001 census in each census region.

- Ngamiland East has Bodibeng, Botlhatlogo, Chanoga, Habu, Kareng, Kgakge/Makakung, Komana, Mababe, Makalamabedi, Matlapana, Maun, Phuduhudu, Sehithwa, Semboyo, Sankuyo, Shorobe, Toteng, Tsao villages.
- Ngamiland West has Beetsha, Etsha 6, Etsha 13, Gani, Gonutsuga, Gumare, Ikoga, Kauxwhi, Mohembo East, Mohembo West, Mokgacha, Ngarange, Nokaneng, Nxamasere, Nxaunxau, Qangwa, Sepopa, Seronga, Shakawe, Tobere, Tubu, Xakao, Xaxa, Xhauga villages.
- Delta region has Daonara, Ditshiping, Jao, Katamaga, Morutsha, Xaxaba villages. In the 2011 census the population figures for the delta were included in the totals of Ngamiland East.

When Botswana gained independence from the British in 1966, they adapted the colonial administration framework to form its district administration. The policies were modified between 1970 and 1974 to address impediments to rural development.

The district administration, a district council, and the Okavango subdistrict council are responsible for local administration. The policies for the administration are framed by the Ministry of Local Government. The major activities of the district council are Tribal Administration, Remote Area Development and Local Governance. The executive powers of the council are vested in a commissioner appointed by the central government. The technical services wing of the Department of Local Government is responsible for developing roads and the infrastructure in villages such as water supply, schools and recreational facilities. All local administration staff, except the District Administration staff itself, are selected via centralised services of the North West District Council, with the Ministry of Local Government being responsible for their training, deployment and career development. The sub-districts of North-West/Ngamiland District are Ngamiland East (aka Ngamiland South, headquarters Maun), Ngamiland West (aka Ngamiland North) and Okavango, also called Ngamiland Delta, (headquarters Gumare).

Border crossings

There are two border checkpoints with Namibia in the North-West District:

- Mohembo, along the Okavango in the north
- Dobe to the west.

Towns and villages

Population 50,000+

- Maun

Population over 10,000

- Gumare
- Shakawe

Population under 10,000

- Lesoma
- Parakarungu

== See also ==
- Sub-districts of Botswana
