= Gumare =

Village in Botswana

Coordinates: 19°22′09″S 22°09′42″E

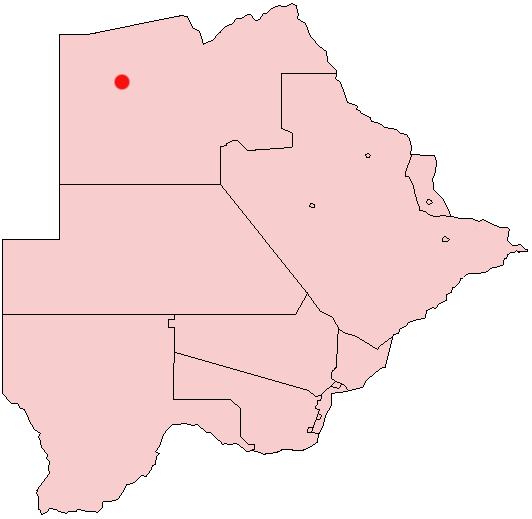
Location of Gumare in Botswana

Gumare or Gomare is a rural village located in the North-West District of Botswana, near the Okavango Delta. The population of Gumare was 6,067 in 2001 census, but had risen to 8,532 iby the 2011 census.

Gumare is served by Gumare Airport.

Four separate government institutions manage Ngamiland District:

1. District Council;
2. District Administration;
3. Tribal Administration;
4. Land Board.

Maun serves as the administrative center of Ngamiland. Gumare is the administrative headquarters for the Okavango Delta Subdistrict, which has its own set of administrative institutions. Okavango's administrative boundary starts at Habu, including Qangwa and Xaixai up to Gudigwa. Its political boundary starts from Etsha 1 up to Gudigwa and this is different from education and agriculture. There are twenty-seven villages in the Okavango Sub-district, although the 2011 census only enumerates six: Daonara, Ditshiping, Jao, Katamaga, Morutsha, and Xaxaba.

Okavango is really only one part of the remarkable Kalahari ecosystem. Okavango is set within a geographically unstable area of faults and regularly experiences land movements, tremors and quakes. Hence, its natural world with a landscape that is always changing and quite unpredictable. There are arid lands, swamps, channels, lagoons, grasslands, lakes and countless islands of various shape and size.

The predominant ethnic groups in the sub-district are Batawana, Bayei, Baherero and Bambukushu, and Basubiya. There are also the Banoka (River Bushman), Okavango's original inhabitants, and the Bakgalagadi and the Herero. Most groups form their settlements along the river, which they use for subsistence fishing and watering for livestock. They also plough the flood plains, growing maize and sorghum.

The major economic activities in the Okavango include tourism (although the tourist companies are predominantly owned by foreign companies), livestock rearing, handicrafts and small scale industries, and some agriculture. The Okavango Sub-district is largely rural with a population that is heavily dependent on farming for their daily needs. In 1975 a United Nations Development Project assisted villagers in Gumare and Etsha to develop their basket weaving skills into the renowned baskets from Botswana, an exportable product. Baskets and other small, high quality crafts were driven to Gaborone and exported from there to the United States and Europe for sale.

Like other districts in Botswana, the Okavango is faced with a serious challenge of high prevalence of HIV/AIDS among the communities.
