= Shakawe =

Coordinates: 18°22′9″S 21°50′45″E

Location of Shakawe

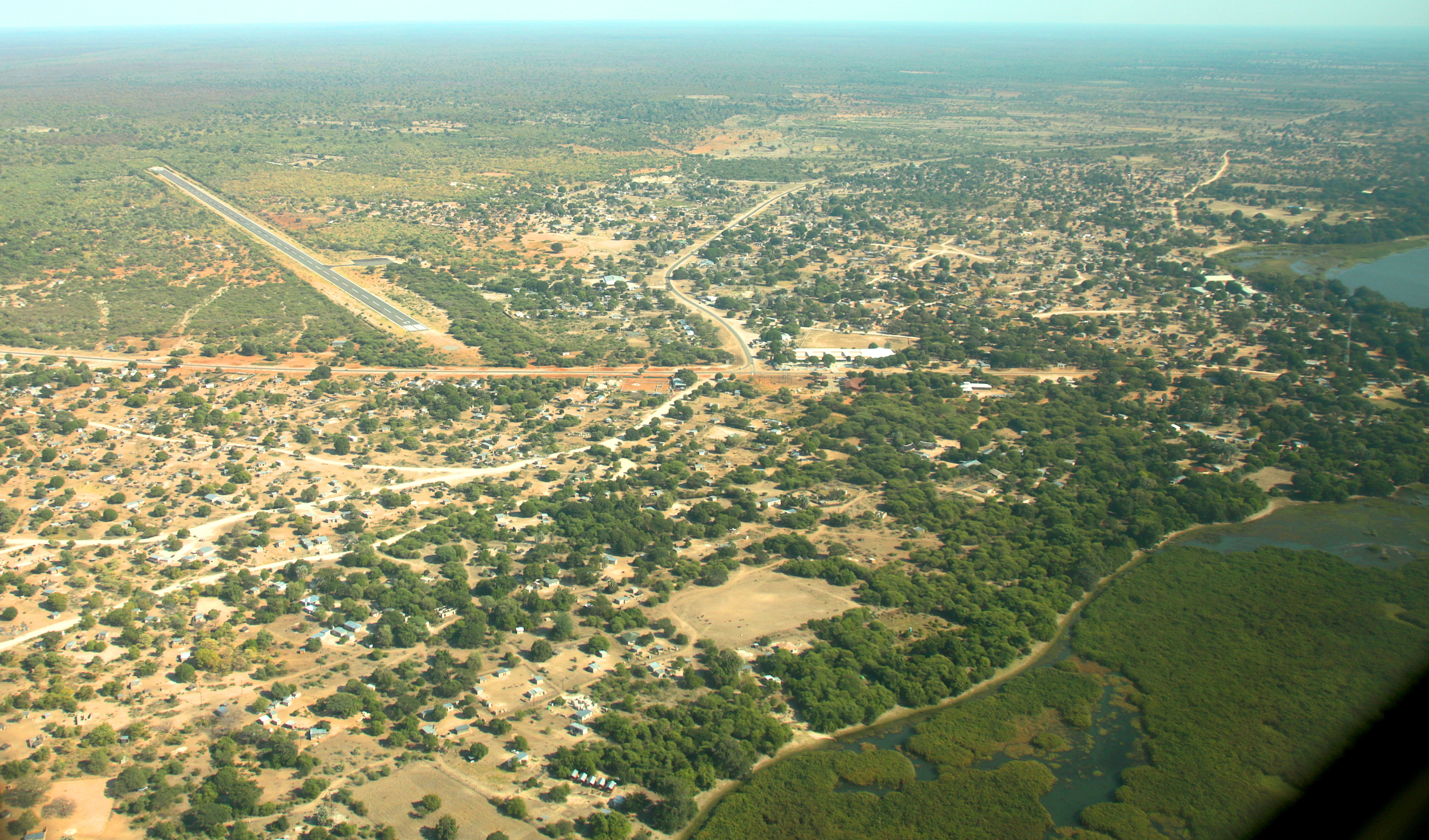
Shakawe with runway (top left) and Okavango River (right)

Shakawe is a village located in the northwest corner of Botswana at the beginning of the Okavango Delta, close to Namibia and Angola. Shakawe is awakening from its former status as a sleepy little outpost on the Okavango. For travellers, Shakawe means a Botswana entry or exit stamp or a staging post for a visit to the Tsodilo Hills, a UNESCO World Heritage Site, 40 km away. For Southern African holiday-makers, it is most often the start of a fishing trip in the Okavango Panhandle. It also provides access to the Caprivi Strip. The record high temperature ever registered in Shakawe was 39.6 °C (103.3 °F). The lowest temperature registered in Shakawe was −6.1 °C (21.0 °F).

== Infrastructure ==
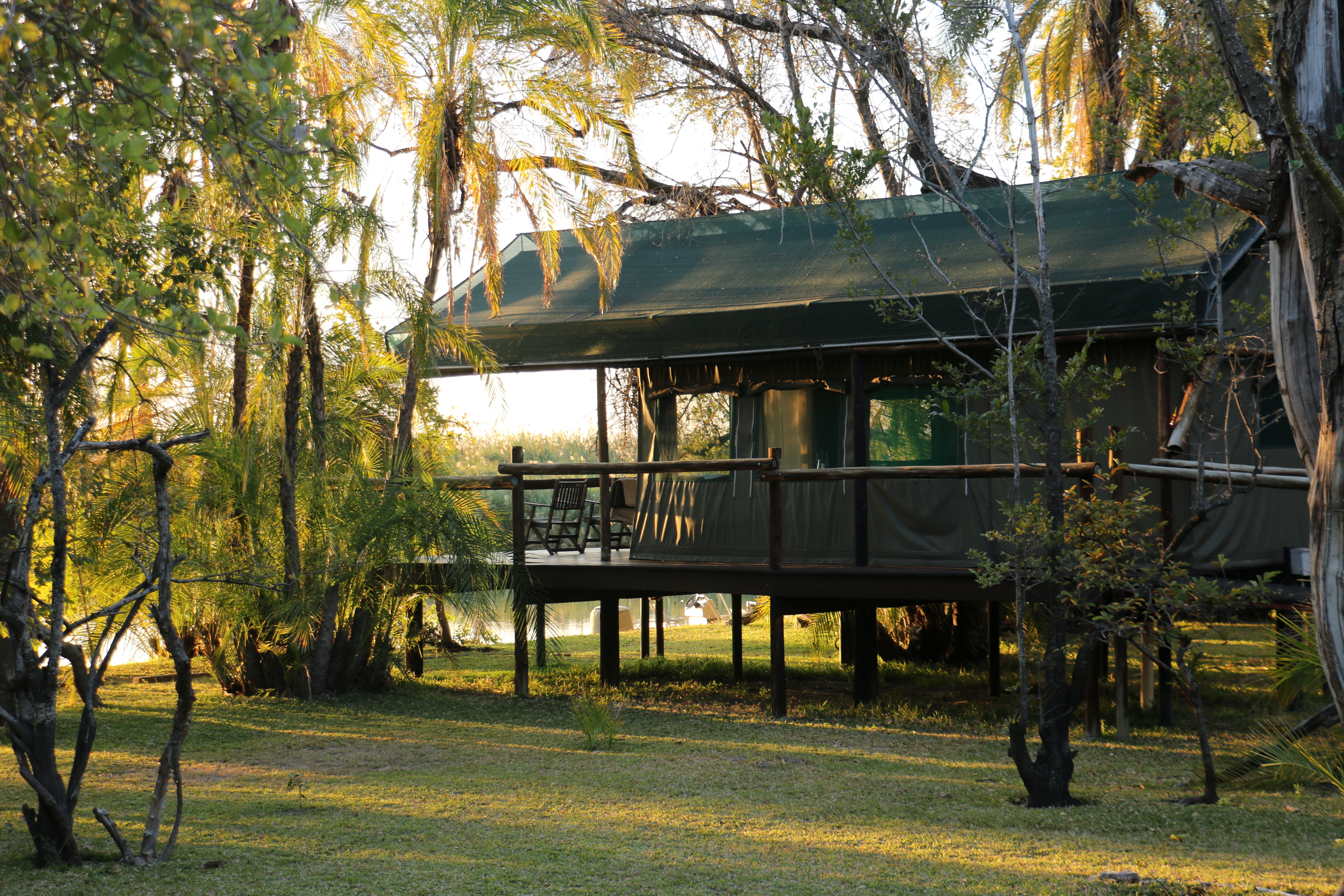
A Tented Lodge at Okavango River near Shakawe (2017)

The village is served by Shakawe Airport. It is the gateway to the northern part of the Okavango Delta and the Linyanti area. Direct charter flights are operated to the aerodrome, with the main airline in the area being AirShakawe. Flight is the most efficient form of transport in the area.

Travel by road is slow. Tarred roads have been constructed but have deteriorated over time due to under-maintenance. Bus transport is available to the main city of Maun, but this is a 5-hour travel. The large village has also been connected to the main electric grid. A bridge is also under construction and is due to be finished around the end of 2019. Various lodges and tented camps have been constructed. The main ones are Xaro Lodge, Drotsky's Cabins and Shakawe River Lodge.

Shakawe is growing rapidly starting with two shopping centers or malls. Each mall has a well stocked supermarket. Also had developed a few safari lodges. A new medium-sized shopping center is being constructed.

== Demographics ==
As per the 2011 national census, the population of Shakawe and its associated localities was 7,506. The village of Shakawe on its own had 6,693 people.
