= Lake Ngami =

Lake in Botswana

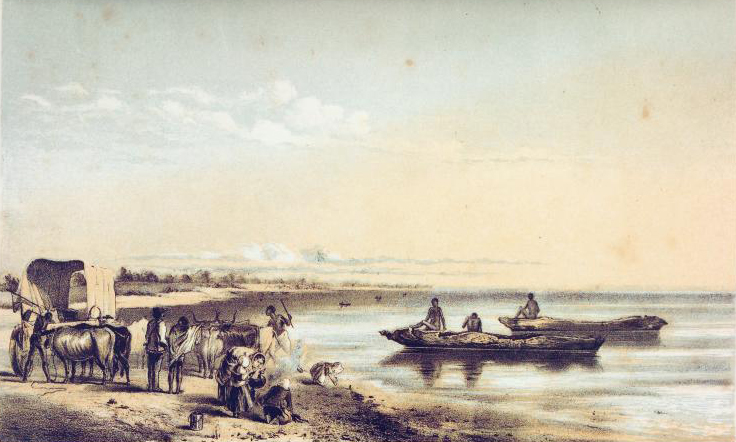
- The lake in 1857

- Location within Botswana Location within Africa
- Location: Botswana
- Coordinates: 20°28′57″S 22°46′21″E
- Lake type: endorheic
- Primary inflows: Okavango Delta
- Primary outflows: None (Endorheic)
- Basin countries: Botswana

Lake Ngami is an endorheic lake in Botswana, north of the Kalahari Desert. It is seasonally filled by the Taughe River, an effluent of the Okavango River system flowing out of the western side of the Okavango Delta. It is one of the fragmented remnants of the ancient Lake Makgadikgadi. Although the lake has shrunk dramatically beginning from 1890, it remains an important habitat for birds and wildlife, especially in flood years.

== Visits ==
Lake Ngami had many famous visitors during the 19th (and into the 20th) century. In 1849 David Livingstone described it as a "shimmering lake, some 80 miles [130 km] long and 20 [30 km] wide". Livingstone also made a few cultural notes about the people living in this area; he noticed they had a story similar to that of the Tower of Babel, except that the builders' heads were "cracked by the fall of the scaffolding" (Missionary Travels, chap. 26).

One of the illustrations is known to have been made on the basis of a sketch by Mr. Alfred Ryder (1825-1850), son of the artist William Mills Rider (1795 - 1841), a young Englishman who had visited Lake Ngami just a few months before Livingstone arrived there. He had died on his way back. Ryder had made a sketch of the lake and although it was left unfinished, Livingstone persuaded Mrs. Ryder to lend it for the illustration of his book.8 Besides carefully copying the lake scenery, the artist employed by Murray was asked to add a family group into the picture to make it more suitable for Livingstone's purposes.

Charles John Andersson (who published Lake Ngami; or, Explorations and Discoveries during Four Years' Wanderings in the Wilds of Southwestern Africa in 1856) and Frederick Thomas Green also visited the area in the early 1850s. Frederick Lugard led a British expedition to the lake in 1896. Arnold Weinholt Hodson passed through the area on his journey from Serowe to Victoria Falls in 1906.

Ngami Lacuna, a methane lake on Saturn's moon Titan, is named after this lake.
