= 3rd Parliament of Botswana =

1974–1979 legislative meeting

The 3rd Parliament of Botswana was the meeting of the National Assembly of Botswana from 1974 to 1979. It had thirty two standard members, four specially elected members, and two ex officio members. Its members were chosen in the 1974 Botswana general election.

== Members ==
The following members were elected during the 1974 Botswana general election.

| Constituency | Member | Party |
|---|---|---|
| President | Seretse Khama | Botswana Democratic Party |
| Speaker | Albert Frank Lock | Botswana Democratic Party |
| Bobirwa | Abel C. Sikunyane | Botswana Democratic Party |
| Lobatse/Barolong | Benjamin C. Thema | Botswana Democratic Party |
| Boteti | Lenyeletse M. Seretse | Botswana Democratic Party |
| Francistown | Philip Matante | Botswana People's Party |
| Gaborone | Welly M. Seboni | Botswana Democratic Party |
| Ghanzi | Henry Jankie | Botswana Democratic Party |
| Kanye North | Motsokwane N. Yane | Botswana National Front |
| Kanye South | Bathoen Gaseitsiwe | Botswana National Front |
| Kgalagadi | Boy M. Moapare | Botswana Democratic Party |
| Kgatleng/Tlokweng | Motlatsi K. Segokgo | Botswana Democratic Party |
| Kweneng East | Englishman M.K. Kgabo | Botswana Democratic Party |
| Kweneng South | Peter Mmusi | Botswana Democratic Party |
| Kweneng West | Eyes G. Reokwaeng | Botswana Democratic Party |
| Mahalapye | Gaolese Kent Koma | Botswana Democratic Party |
| Maun/Chobe | Dikgothi R. Mongwela | Botswana Democratic Party |
| Mmadinare | Kebatlamang P. Morake | Botswana Democratic Party |
| Mochudi | Greek S. W. Ruele | Botswana Democratic Party |
| Molepolole | Daniel Kwelagobe | Botswana Democratic Party |
| Moshopa | Edison Masisi | Botswana Democratic Party |
| Ngami | Gaerolwe Mesho Kwerepe | Botswana Democratic Party |
| Ngwaketse/Kgalagadi | Quett Masire | Botswana Democratic Party |
| Nkange | Obed I. Chilume | Botswana Democratic Party |
| North-East | Kenneth Moesi Nkhwa | Botswana People's Party |
| Okavango | Motsamai Mpho | Botswana Independence Party |
| Sebina/Gweta | Mudongo Maswikiti | Botswana Democratic Party |
| Serowe North | Colin Warren Blackbeard | Botswana Democratic Party |
| Serowe South | Bakwena K. Kgari | Botswana Democratic Party |
| Shoshong | Goareng S. Mosinyi | Botswana Democratic Party |
| Ramotswa | K.R. Kobue | Botswana Democratic Party |
| Tonota | Lemme Makgekgenene | Botswana Democratic Party |
| Tswapong North | Moutlakgola P.K. Nwako | Botswana Democratic Party |
| Tswapong South | Gaefalale G. Sebeso | Botswana Democratic Party |
| Specially elected | James Haskins | |
| Specially elected | Gaositwe Chiepe | |
| Specially elected | Archibald Mogwe | |
| Specially elected | Kebatshabile Disele | |
