= 4th Parliament of Botswana =

1979–1984 legislative meeting

The 4th Parliament of Botswana was the meeting of the National Assembly of Botswana from 1979 to 1984. It had thirty two standard members, four specially elected members, and two ex officio members. Its members were chosen in the 1979 Botswana general election.

== Members ==
The following members were elected during the 1979 Botswana general election.

Constituency	Member	Party
President	Seretse Khama (until 13 July 1980)	Botswana Democratic Party
President	Quett Masire (from 13 July 1980)	Botswana Democratic Party
Speaker	Albert Frank Lock	Botswana Democratic Party
Bobirwa	Walter Gosiame Mosweu	Botswana Democratic Party
Lobatse/Barolong	Dingaan Dichaba	Botswana Democratic Party
Boteti	Lenyeletse M. Seretse	Botswana Democratic Party
Francistown	Patrick K. Balopi	Botswana Democratic Party
Gaborone	Peter Mmusi	Botswana Democratic Party
Ghanzi	Gaerolwe M. Kwerepe	Botswana Democratic Party
Kanye North	Motsokwane N. Yane	Botswana National Front
Kanye South	Bathoen Gaseitsiwe	Botswana National Front
Kgalagadi	Lesedi J. T. Mothibamele	Botswana Democratic Party
Kgatleng/Tlokweng	Washington R. Meswele	Botswana Democratic Party
Kweneng East	David Ntsimele Magang	Botswana Democratic Party
Kweneng South	Englishman M. K. Kgabo	Botswana Democratic Party
Kweneng West	Eyes G. Reokwaeng	Botswana Democratic Party
Mahalapye	Gaolese Kent Koma	Botswana Democratic Party
Maun/Chobe	Dikgothi R. Mongwela	Botswana Democratic Party
Mmadinare	Amos M. Dambe	Botswana Democratic Party
Mochudi	Greek S. W. Ruele	Botswana Democratic Party
Molepolole	Daniel Kwelagobe	Botswana Democratic Party
Moshopa	Edison Masisi	Botswana Democratic Party
Ngami	Gaerolwe Mesho Kwerepe	Botswana Democratic Party
Ngwaketse/Kgalagadi	Quett Masire	Botswana Democratic Party
Nkange	Obed I. Chilume	Botswana Democratic Party
North-East	Kenneth Moesi Nkhwa	Botswana People's Party
Okavango	Bailang O. Salepito	Botswana Democratic Party
Sebina/Gweta	Mudongo Maswikiti	Botswana Democratic Party
Serowe North	Colin Warren Blackbeard	Botswana Democratic Party
Serowe South	Gaositwe K.T. Chiepe	Botswana Democratic Party
Shoshong	Goareng S. Mosinyi	Botswana Democratic Party
Ramotswa	Geoffrey M. Oteng	Botswana Democratic Party
Tonota	Lemme Makgekgenene	Botswana Democratic Party
Tswapong North	Moutlakgola P.K. Nwako	Botswana Democratic Party
Tswapong South	Gaefalale G. Sebeso	Botswana Democratic Party
Specially elected	Kebatshabile Disele	
Specially elected	Archibald Mogwe	
Specially elected	Gaotlhaetse Matlhabaphiri	
Specially elected	Daniel Kwele	
