= List of general elections in Botswana =

Botswana is a parliamentary republic with an executive presidency operating under a multi-party system. General elections are held every five years to elect representatives to the National Assembly of Botswana, which is the country's unicameral legislature, an electoral system which relies on single-member constituencies and uses first-past-the-post voting. The country first adopted universal suffrage during the 1965 Bechuanaland general election. Following this election, Botswana gained full independence from the United Kingdom as the Republic of Botswana on 30 September 1966. The President of Botswana is chosen indirectly by the National Assembly, meaning that the presidential candidate that belongs to the political party which secures a governing majority of elected seats is automatically sworn in as president. Each president is limited to two five-year terms; Quett Masire, the second president, created Botswana's term limit in 1997. The country has held 13 general elections since having self-governance.

Until 2024, Botswana operated under a dominant-party system led by the Botswana Democratic Party (BDP), which was founded by the nation's first president, Sir Seretse Khama. However, the 2024 general election broke this streak after the Umbrella for Democratic Change (UDC) secured a legislative majority, resulting in the country's first democratic transition of power.

Changes in population growth and constituency boundaries have caused the total number of directly elected seats in the National Assembly to steadily increase over time, going from 31 seats in 1965 to 61 seats by 2024.

== List ==
List of general elections in Botswana (prior to universal suffrage)
| Election | References | |
|---|---|---|
| Election | References | 1961 (Note: A new constitution in 1960 created a Legislative Council, an Executive Council, and an Advisory African Council. The Legislative Council had just over 30 members; 10 colonial officials, 10 blacks, 10 whites, one Asian and some co-opted members. Seretse Khama received the most votes in the election for the black representatives.) |

Composition of the Parliament of Botswana as of 2026. (Note: The parliament comprises 61 directly elected constituency members, six specially elected members, and two ex-officio members.)

Graph of National Assembly seat share by party in Botswana.

List of general elections in Botswana (post-universal suffrage)
| Election | Winner | | Runner-up | | Seats won by other parties | Total seats | Voter turnout | References |
| Election | Party | Seats won | Party | Seats won | Seats won by other parties | Total seats | Voter turnout | References |
|---|---|---|---|---|---|---|---|---|
| 1965 | BDP | 28 | BPP | 3 | 0 | 31 | 74.55% | |
| 1969 | BDP | 24 | BNF | 3 | 4 | 31 | 54.7% | |
| 1974 | BDP | 27 | BNF | 2 | 3 | 32 | 31.2% | |
| 1979 | BDP | 29 | BNF | 2 | 1 | 32 | 58.4% | |
| 1984 | BDP | 29 | BNF | 4 | 1 | 34 | 77.6% | |
| 1989 | BDP | 31 | BNF | 3 | 0 | 34 | 68.2% | |
| 1994 | BDP | 27 | BNF | 13 | 0 | 40 | 76.6% | |
| 1999 | BDP | 33 | BNF | 6 | 1 | 40 | 77.11% | |
| 2004 | BDP | 44 | BNF | 12 | 1 | 57 | 76.2% | |
| 2009 | BDP | 45 | BNF | 6 | 6 | 57 | 76.71% | |
| 2014 | BDP | 37 | UDC | 17 | 3 | 57 | 84.75% | |
| 2019 | BDP | 38 | UDC | 15 | 4 | 57 | 84.1% | |
| 2024 | UDC | 36 | BCP | 15 | 10 | 61 | 81.4% | |
