= Molepolole South =

Parliamentary constituency in Botswana

- Single-member constituency for the National Assembly
- District: Kweneng
- Population: 45,036
- Electorate: 20,684
- Major settlements: Molepolole
- Area: 970 km^{2}

Current constituency
- Created: 1965
- Party: UDC
- MP: Shima Monageng
- Margin of victory: 2,364 (14.8 pp)

Molepolole South is a constituency in the Kweneng District represented by Shima Monageng, a UDC Member of Parliament in the National Assembly of Botswana since 2024.

== Constituency profile ==
Molepolole South has existed since the inaugural 1965 general election, when it was contested as Molepolole East. It was later known as Kweneng East from the 1974 to the 1989 general elections, and as Lentsweletau in the 1994 and 1999 elections. It has been contested as Molepolole South since the 2004 general election.

The constituency is centred on the southern part of Molepolole, one of Botswana's largest traditional villages and extends into surrounding localities in the southern part of Kweneng District.

Politically, the constituency was long associated with the BDP. The party held the seat under its successive names from 1965 until 2014, including through prominent figures such as David Magang and Daniel Kwelagobe. The UDC first broke the BDP's uninterrupted hold on the seat at the 2014 general election, when Tlamelo Mmatli narrowly defeated Kwelagobe.

The constituency has the following localities:

1. Part of Molepolole
2. Mmanoko
3. Gamodubu
4. Kotolaname
5. Losilakgokong

== Members of Parliament ==
Key: BDP UDC UDC

Election	Winner
1965 election	Englishman Kgabo
1969 election	Englishman Kgabo
1974 election	Englishman Kgabo
1979 election	David Magang
1984 election	David Magang
1989 election	David Magang
1994 election	David Magang
1999 election	David Magang
2004 election	Daniel Kwelagobe
2009 election	Daniel Kwelagobe
2014 election	Tlamelo Mmatli
2019 election	Kabo Morwaeng
2024 election	Shima Monageng

== Election results ==
=== 2024 election ===
General election 2024: Molepolole South
Party	Candidate	Votes	%	±%
UDC	Shima Monageng	8,266	51.56	+32.63
BDP	Kabo Morwaeng	5,902	36.82	−34.05
BCP	Kagiso Gopolang	1,100	6.86	N/A
BPF	Tlamelo Mmatli	568	3.54	N/A
Independent	Kuswani Ntloedibe	195	1.22	N/A
Margin of victory		2,364	14.75	N/A
Total valid votes		16,031	97.39	−1.95
Rejected ballots		430	2.61	+1.95
Turnout		16,461	79.58	−4.68
Registered electors		20,684		
UDC gain from BDP		Swing	+33.34	

=== 2019 election ===
General election 2019: Molepolole South
Party	Candidate	Votes	%	±%
BDP	Kabo Morwaeng	10,228	70.87	+23.37
UDC	Tlamelo Mmatli	2,733	18.94	−31.86
AP	Shima Monageng	1,471	10.19	N/A
Margin of victory		7,495	51.93	N/A
Total valid votes		14,432	99.34	+0.57
Rejected ballots		96	0.66	−0.57
Turnout		14,528	84.26	−3.35
Registered electors		17,241		
BDP gain from UDC		Swing	+27.61	

=== 2014 election ===
General election 2014: Molepolole South
Party	Candidate	Votes	%	±%
UDC	Tlamelo Mmatli	5,967	50.80	+25.07
BDP	Daniel Kwelagobe	5,580	47.50	−26.77
Independent	Mojalemotho Molefe	200	1.70	N/A
Margin of victory		387	3.29	N/A
Total valid votes		11,747	98.77	+0.52
Rejected ballots		146	1.23	−0.52
Turnout		11,893	87.62	+9.91
Registered electors		13,574		
UDC gain from BDP		Swing	+25.92	

=== 2009 election ===
General election 2009: Molepolole South
Party	Candidate	Votes	%	±%
BDP	Daniel Kwelagobe	5,589	74.27	+5.09
BNF	David Mhiemang	1,936	25.73	−2.30
Margin of victory		3,653	48.54	+7.39
Total valid votes		7,525	98.25	+0.05
Rejected ballots		134	1.75	−0.05
Turnout		7,659	77.71	+2.49
Registered electors		9,856		
BDP hold		Swing	+3.69	

=== 2004 election ===
General election 2004: Molepolole South
Party	Candidate	Votes	%	±%
BDP	Daniel Kwelagobe	3,935	69.18	+5.23
BNF	Benjamin Modimoothata	1,594	28.02	+2.79
BCP	Ray Moremong	159	2.80	−8.02
Margin of victory		2,341	41.16	+2.44
Total valid votes		5,688	98.20	+4.33
Rejected ballots		104	1.80	−4.33
Turnout		5,792	75.22	−0.97
Registered electors		7,700		
BDP hold		Swing	+1.22	

=== 1999 election ===
General election 1999: Lentsweletau
Party	Candidate	Votes	%	±%
BDP	David Magang	4,187	63.95	−4.77
BNF	J. Pule	1,652	25.23	−6.04
BCP	L. Mokakane	708	10.81	N/A
Margin of victory		2,535	38.72	+1.27
Total valid votes		6,547	93.88	N/A
Rejected ballots		427	6.12	N/A
Turnout		6,974	76.19	−1.48
Registered electors		9,153		
BDP hold		Swing	+0.64	

=== 1994 election ===
General election 1994: Lentsweletau
Party	Candidate	Votes	%	±%
BDP	David Magang	3,608	68.72	−11.81
BNF	K. Dirang	1,642	31.28	+11.81
Margin of victory		1,966	37.45	−23.62
Turnout		5,250	77.67	+8.39
Registered electors		6,759		
BDP hold		Swing	−11.81	

=== 1989 election ===
General election 1989: Kweneng East
Party	Candidate	Votes	%	±%
BDP	David Magang	4,075	80.53	−5.57
BNF	Daniel Magogwe	985	19.47	+5.57
Margin of victory		3,090	61.07	−11.14
Turnout		5,060	69.29	−11.73
Registered electors		7,303		
BDP hold		Swing	−5.57	

=== 1984 election ===
General election 1984: Kweneng East
Party	Candidate	Votes	%	±%
BDP	David Magang	4,337	86.10	−6.94
BNF	James Motswakhumo	700	13.90	+6.94
Margin of victory		3,637	72.21	−13.88
Turnout		5,037	81.02	+15.94
Registered electors		6,217		
BDP hold		Swing	−6.94	

=== 1979 election ===
General election 1979: Kweneng East
Party	Candidate	Votes	%	±%
BDP	David Magang	2,714	93.04	−1.42
BNF	L. Ntime	203	6.96	+1.42
Margin of victory		2,511	86.08	−2.84
Turnout		2,917	65.08	+27.46
Registered electors		4,482		
BDP hold		Swing	−1.42	

=== 1974 election ===
General election 1974: Kweneng East
Party	Candidate	Votes	%	±%
BDP	Englishman Kgabo	1,620	94.46	+14.89
BNF	E. Sebele	95	5.54	−14.89
Margin of victory		1,525	88.92	+29.79
Turnout		1,715	37.63	−14.37
Registered electors		4,558		
BDP hold		Swing	+14.89	

=== 1969 election ===
General election 1969: Molepolole East
Party	Candidate	Votes	%	±%
BDP	Englishman Kgabo	2,095	79.57	+0.57
BNF	V. Busang	538	20.43	N/A
Margin of victory		1,557	59.13	−1.80
Turnout		2,633	51.99	N/A
Registered electors		5,064		
BDP hold		Swing	N/A	

=== 1965 election ===
General election 1965: Molepolole East
Party	Candidate	Votes	%
BDP	Englishman Kgabo	3,555	79.00
BPP	P. Kgosidintsi	813	18.07
BIP	S. Molefi	132	2.93
Margin of victory		2,742	60.93
Turnout		4,500	N/A
Registered electors		N/A	
BDP win (new seat)			
