= Serowe South =

Parliamentary constituency in Botswana

- Single-member constituency for the National Assembly
- District: Central
- Population: 34,765
- Electorate: 16,371
- Major settlements: Serowe
- Area: 7,255 km^{2}

Current constituency
- Created: 1965
- Party: BPF
- MP: Lesedi Lepetswe
- Margin of victory: 3,181 (24.9 pp)

Serowe South is a constituency in the Central District represented by Lesedi Lepetswe, a BPF MP in the National Assembly of Botswana since 2019.

== Constituency profile ==
Serowe South lies in the Central District and includes southern parts of Serowe and surrounding villages. The constituency was historically a BDP stronghold, returning BDP MPs from the inaugural 1965 election until the 2019 general election, when it was won by the BPF.

The constituency has the following localities:

1. Parts of Serowe
2. Mabuo
3. Sehunou
4. Thabala
5. Mogorosi
6. Motshegaletau
7. Moiyabana

== Members of Parliament ==
Key: BDP BPF

Election	Winner
1965 election	Bakwena Kgari
1969 election	Bakwena Kgari
1974 election	Bakwena Kgari
1979 election	Colin Blackbeard
1984 election	Gaositwe Chiepe
1989 election	Gaositwe Chiepe
1994 election	Gaositwe Chiepe
1999 election	Tebelelo Seretse
2004 election	Pelonomi Venson-Moitoi
2009 election	Pelonomi Venson-Moitoi
2014 election	Pelonomi Venson-Moitoi
2019 election	Lesedi Lepetswe
2024 election	Lesedi Lepetswe

== Election results ==
=== 2024 election ===
General election 2024: Serowe South
Party	Candidate	Votes	%	±%
BPF	Lesedi Lepeetswe	5,653	44.18	+6.03
Independent	Kolaatamo Malefho	2,472	19.32	N/A
BDP	Lesedi Phuthego	2,439	19.06	−15.98
BCP	Malebogo Mpe	1,573	12.29	N/A
BRP	Otladisang Otladisang	658	5.14	N/A
Margin of victory		3,181	24.86	+21.75
Total valid votes		12,795	98.42	−0.55
Rejected ballots		205	1.58	+0.55
Turnout		13,000	79.41	−0.84
Registered electors		16,371		
BPF hold		Swing	+11.00	

=== 2019 election ===
General election 2019: Serowe South
Party	Candidate	Votes	%	±%
BPF	Lesedi Leepetswe	4,653	38.15	N/A
BDP	Lesedi Phuthego	4,273	35.04	−34.62
UDC	Mareka Moremi	2,362	19.37	+6.30
AP	Iphemele Kgokgothwane	393	3.22	N/A
Independent	Khumo Ati	247	2.03	N/A
BMD	Prince Motoi	234	1.92	N/A
Independent	Oteng Thankane	33	0.27	N/A
Margin of victory		380	3.12	N/A
Total valid votes		12,195	98.98	+0.29
Rejected ballots		126	1.02	−0.29
Turnout		12,321	80.25	−1.54
Registered electors		15,353		
BPF gain from BDP		Swing	+36.39	

=== 2014 election ===
General election 2014: Serowe South
Party	Candidate	Votes	%	±%
BDP	Pelonomi Venson	7,833	69.66	−6.73
UDC	Brigadier Iphemele Kgokgothwane	1,469	13.06	−3.61
Independent	Richard Bagwasi	1,359	12.09	N/A
BCP	Stephen Mpofu	583	5.18	−1.76
Margin of victory		6,364	56.60	−3.13
Total valid votes		11,244	98.69	+2.31
Rejected ballots		149	1.31	−2.31
Turnout		11,393	81.79	+9.47
Registered electors		13,929		
BDP hold		Swing	−1.57	

=== 2009 election ===
General election 2009: Serowe South
Party	Candidate	Votes	%	±%
BDP	Pelonomi Venson-Moitoi	7,375	76.39	−4.24
BNF	Moses Mozila	1,609	16.67	+2.87
BCP	Balangani Nthume	670	6.94	+1.37
Margin of victory		5,766	59.73	−7.10
Total valid votes		9,654	96.38	+0.02
Rejected ballots		363	3.62	−0.02
Turnout		10,017	72.32	−3.12
Registered electors		13,850		
BDP hold		Swing	−3.56	

=== 2004 election ===
General election 2004: Serowe South
Party	Candidate	Votes	%	±%
BDP	Pelonomi Venson-Moitoi	6,228	80.63	−3.71
BNF	Moses Mozila	1,066	13.80	+1.34
BCP	Morwadi Morwadi	430	5.57	+2.37
Margin of victory		5,162	66.83	−5.05
Total valid votes		7,724	96.36	+0.77
Rejected ballots		292	3.64	−0.77
Turnout		8,016	75.44	+0.48
Registered electors		10,626		
BDP hold		Swing	−2.53	

=== 1999 election ===
General election 1999: Serowe South
Party	Candidate	Votes	%	±%
BDP	Tebelelo Seretse	6,538	84.34	+1.28
BNF	G. Nthebolang	966	12.46	−2.66
BCP	L. Letlhare	248	3.20	N/A
Margin of victory		5,572	71.88	+3.94
Total valid votes		7,752	95.59	N/A
Rejected ballots		358	4.41	N/A
Turnout		8,110	74.96	−4.06
Registered electors		10,819		
BDP hold		Swing	+1.97	

=== 1994 election ===
General election 1994: Serowe South
Party	Candidate	Votes	%	±%
BDP	Gaositwe Chiepe	6,064	83.06	−7.96
BNF	S. Ramaribana	1,104	15.12	+6.14
LLB	L. Leepile	82	1.12	
BPP	B. S. Sebenyane	51	0.70	N/A
Margin of victory		4,960	67.94	−14.10
Turnout		7,301	79.02	+13.94
Registered electors		9,240		
BDP hold		Swing	−7.05	

=== 1989 election ===
General election 1989: Serowe South
Party	Candidate	Votes	%	±%
BDP	Gaositwe Chiepe	6,879	91.02	−4.46
BNF	Reggie Koee	679	8.98	+4.46
Margin of victory		6,200	82.03	−8.93
Turnout		7,558	65.08	−19.16
Registered electors		11,614		
BDP hold		Swing	−4.46	

=== 1984 election ===
General election 1984: Serowe South
Party	Candidate	Votes	%	±%
BDP	Gaositwe Chiepe	8,263	95.48	−3.62
BNF	Lenyeletse Koma	391	4.52	+3.62
Margin of victory		7,872	90.96	−7.24
Turnout		8,654	84.24	+14.85
Registered electors		10,273		
BDP hold		Swing	−3.62	

=== 1979 election ===
General election 1979: Serowe South
Party	Candidate	Votes	%	±%
BDP	Colin Blackbeard	5,502	99.10	+0.39
BNF	T. E. Kuhlman	50	0.90	−0.39
Margin of victory		5,452	98.20	+0.78
Turnout		5,552	69.39	+35.71
Registered electors		8,001		
BDP hold		Swing	+0.39	

=== 1977 by-election ===
By-election 1977: Serowe South
Party	Candidate	Votes	%
BDP	Gaositwe Chiepe	Unkwown	Unkwown
BDP hold			

=== 1974 election ===
General election 1974: Serowe South
Party	Candidate	Votes	%	±%
BDP	Bakwena Kgari	2,453	98.71	+0.09
BNF	M. Seretse	32	1.29	−0.09
Margin of victory		2,421	97.42	+0.18
Turnout		2,485	33.90	−30.00
Registered electors		7,379		
BDP hold		Swing	+0.09	

=== 1969 election ===
General election 1969: Serowe South
Party	Candidate	Votes	%	±%
BDP	Bakwena Kgari	2,438	98.62	+1.94
BNF	K. R. Mathware	34	1.38	N/A
Margin of victory		2,404	97.25	+2.78
Turnout		2,472	63.90	N/A
Registered electors		3,869		
BDP hold		Swing	N/A	

=== 1965 election ===
General election 1965: Serowe South
Party	Candidate	Votes	%
BDP	Bakwena Kgari	4,808	96.68
BIP	M. Seretse	110	2.21
BPP	D. Ontumetse	55	1.11
Margin of victory		4,698	94.47
Turnout		4,973	88.00
Registered electors		N/A	
BDP win (new seat)			
