= Tswapong North =

Parliamentary constituency in the Central District of Botswana, 1965 onwards

- Single-member constituency for the National Assembly
- District: Central District
- Population: 41,245
- Major settlements: Lerala
- Area: 6,151 km^{2}

Current constituency
- Created: 1965
- Party: UDC
- MP: Prince Maele
- Margin of victory: 3,076 (15.5 pp)

Tswapong North is a constituency in the Central District represented in the National Assembly of Botswana by Prince Maele, a UDC MP and current Minister of Higher Education since 2024.

== Constituency profile ==
Situated in the southeast of the Central District of Botswana, the Tswapong North constituency was established in 1965 for the country's inaugural elections and is one of Botswana's longest extant constituencies.

Reflecting the dominant Tswapong population which has largely assimilated with the Ngwato tribe, the constituency was historically a Botswana Democratic Party (BDP) stronghold. From 1965 to 2014, the BDP consistently garnered an average of 80% of the vote. However, since the turn of the century, the BDP's dominance began to wane, with its vote share decreasing in each election since 1999. The constituency was subject to modest boundary changes and was briefly renamed to Lerala-Maunatlala in the run-up to the 2014 general election.

In 2019, echoing a broader trend within the district, a significant political realignment occurred as Ian Khama, paramount chief of the Ngwato tribe fell out with the incumbent president, Mokgweetsi Masisi and leader of the BDP. This political discord impacted the constituency's voting patterns. The 2019 election saw an 11 percentage point swing against the BDP, marking the first time the BDP failed to have a majority of the votes cast in the constituency. However, opposition parties split votes amongst themselves, allowing the BDP to eke out a victory. In the 2024 Botswana general election, the Umbrella for Democratic Change flipped it to the opposition column due to a steep collapse in the BDP vote, ending the party’s 58-year grip on the constituency.

The constituency, predominantly rural, encompasses the following villages:

1. Lerala
2. Lecheng
3. Mokungwana
4. Matlhakola
5. Goo-Segkweng
6. Gootau
7. Manaledi
8. Majwaneng
9. Seolwane
10. Kagodi
11. Diloro
12. Mogapinyana
13. Ratholo
14. Moeng
15. Mosweu
16. Mokokwana
17. Maunatlala
18. Lesenepole
19. Moremi
20. Malaka
21. Maokatumo
22. Tamasane
23. Mogapi

== Members of Parliament ==
Key: BDP UDC

Election	Winner
1965 election	Moutlakgola P.K. Nwako
1969 election	Moutlakgola P.K. Nwako
1974 election	Moutlakgola P.K. Nwako
1979 election	Moutlakgola P.K. Nwako
1984 election	Moutlakgola P.K. Nwako
1989 election	Moutlakgola P.K. Nwako
1994 election	Thebe Mogami
1999 election	Thebe Mogami
2004 election	Thebe Mogami
2009 election	Prince Maele
2014 election	Prince Maele
2019 election	Setlhabelo Modukanele
2024 election	Prince Maele

== Election results ==
=== 2024 election ===
General election 2024: Tswapong North
Party	Candidate	Votes	%	±%
UDC	Prince Maele	7,433	37.44	+20.11
BPF	Pini Morupisi	4,357	21.95	N/A
BDP	Setlhabelo Modukanele	4,156	20.93	−22.96
BCP	Gothusang Phuthego	3,907	19.68	N/A
Margin of victory		3,076	15.49	N/A
Total valid votes		19,853	99.25	−0.01
Rejected ballots		151	0.75	+0.01
Turnout		20,004	84.63	−2.17
Registered electors		23,637		
UDC gain from BDP		Swing	N/A	

=== 2019 election ===
General election 2019: Lerala-Maunatlala
Party	Candidate	Votes	%	±%
BDP	Setlhabelo Modukanele	6,166	43.89	−10.82
Independent	Prince Maele	5,027	35.78	N/A
UDC	Ketshogile Kabo	2,435	17.33	+7.46
BMD	Dumisani Jeremiah	214	1.52	N/A
AP	Gothusang Phuthego	208	1.48	N/A
Margin of victory		1,139	8.11	−11.18
Total valid votes		14,050	99.26	+0.86
Rejected ballots		105	0.74	−0.86
Turnout		14,155	86.80	+2.26
Registered electors		16,307		
BDP hold		Swing	N/A	

=== 2014 election ===
General election 2014: Lerala-Maunatlala
Party	Candidate	Votes	%	±%
BDP	Prince Maele	6,356	54.71	−4.30
Independent	Setlhabelo Modukanele	4,115	35.42	N/A
BCP	Montwedi Mokhurutse	1,147	9.87	−2.94
Margin of victory		2,241	19.29	−14.15
Total valid votes		11,618	98.40	+3.20
Rejected ballots		189	1.60	−3.20
Turnout		11,807	84.54	+11.31
Registered electors		13,966		
BDP hold		Swing	N/A	

=== 2009 election ===
General election 2009: Tswapong North
Party	Candidate	Votes	%	±%
BDP	Prince Maele	6,049	59.01	−12.21
Independent	Gabagopole Sebele	2,600	25.37	N/A
BCP	Bonang Mafoko	1,313	12.81	−3.76
BNF	Lentsifetse Masilo	288	2.81	−9.39
Margin of victory		3,449	33.44	−21.21
Total valid votes		10,250	95.24	−3.03
Rejected ballots		512	4.76	+3.03
Turnout		10,762	73.23	+1.00
Registered electors		14,696		
BDP hold		Swing	N/A	

=== 2004 election ===
General election 2004: Tswapong North
Party	Candidate	Votes	%	±%
BDP	Thebe Mogami	5,579	71.22	−14.02
BCP	Bonang Mafoko	1,298	16.57	+10.91
BNF	Zachariah Kgwadi	956	12.20	+3.10
Margin of victory		4,281	54.65	−21.49
Total valid votes		7,833	98.27	+2.69
Rejected ballots		138	1.94	−2.69
Turnout		7,971	72.23	−3.40
Registered electors		11,036		
BDP hold		Swing	−12.47	

=== 1999 election ===
General election 1999: Tswapong North
Party	Candidate	Votes	%	±%
BDP	Thebe Mogami	4,973	85.24	−2.05
BNF	L.S. Masilo	531	9.10	−3.61
BCP	O.S. Namane	330	5.66	N/A
Margin of victory		4,442	76.14	+2.13
Total valid votes		5,834	95.58	N/A
Rejected ballots		270	4.42	N/A
Turnout		6,104	68.83	−5.18
Registered electors		8,868		
BDP hold		Swing	+0.78	

=== 1994 election ===
General election 1994: Tswapong North
Party	Candidate	Votes	%	±%
BDP	Thebe Mogami	5,104	87.29	+5.52
BNF	O.S. Namane	743	12.71	−3.54
Margin of victory		4,361	74.58	+9.06
Turnout		5,847	74.01	+6.30
Registered electors		7,900		
BDP hold		Swing	+4.53	

=== 1989 election ===
General election 1989: Tswapong North
Party	Candidate	Votes	%	±%
BDP	Moutlakgola P.K. Nwako	7,156	81.77	−10.73
BNF	James Olesitse	1,422	16.25	+8.75
BIP	Ontiretse Mofswane	103	1.18	N/A
BPP	Edwin Mhaladi	70	0.80	+8.75
Margin of victory		5,734	65.52	−12.51
Turnout		8,751	67.71	−10.32
Registered electors		12,925		
BDP hold		Swing	−9.74	

=== 1984 election ===
General election 1984: Tswapong North
Party	Candidate	Votes	%	±%
BDP	Moutlakgola P.K. Nwako	7,475	92.50	−3.90
BNF	Bailekae Ramahosi	606	7.50	N/A
Margin of victory		6,869	85.00	−7.80
Turnout		8,081	78.03	+19.19
Registered electors		10,356		
BDP hold		Swing	−3.90	

=== 1979 election ===
General election 1979: Tswapong North
Party	Candidate	Votes	%	±%
BDP	Moutlakgola P.K. Nwako	5,724	96.40	+2.27
BIP	Ontiretse Mofswane	214	3.60	−2.27
Margin of victory		5,510	92.80	+4.54
Turnout		5,398	58.84	+20.95
Registered electors		10,091		
BDP hold		Swing	+2.27	

=== 1974 election ===
General election 1974: Tswapong North
Party	Candidate	Votes	%	±%
BDP	Moutlakgola P.K. Nwako	4,424	94.13	+1.37
BIP	Ontiretse Mofswane	276	5.87	−1.37
Margin of victory		4,148	88.26	+2.74
Turnout		4,700	37.89	−25.44
Registered electors		12,403		
BDP hold		Swing	+1.37	

=== 1969 election ===
General election 1969: Tswapong North
Party	Candidate	Votes	%	±%
BDP	Moutlakgola P.K. Nwako	2,921	92.76	+5.66
BIP	Ontiretse Mofswane	228	7.24	−4.73
Margin of victory		2,693	85.52	+10.49
Turnout		3,149	63.33	−20.6
Registered electors		4,972		
BDP hold		Swing	+5.20	

=== 1965 election ===
General election 1965: Tswapong North
Party	Candidate	Votes	%
BDP	Moutlakgola P.K. Nwako	4,949	87.10
BIP	Ontiretse Mofswane	680	11.97
BPP	C. Tladi	53	0.93
Margin of victory		4,269	75.13
Turnout		5,682	~83.9
Registered electors		N/A	
BDP win (new seat)			
