= Serowe North =

Parliamentary constituency in Botswana

- Single-member constituency for the National Assembly
- District: Central
- Population: 29,972
- Major settlements: Serowe
- Area: 3,004 km^{2}

Current constituency
- Created: 1965
- Party: BPF
- Created from: Serowe North East; Serowe North West
- Abolished: 1999
- Re-established: 2014
- MP: Baratiwa Mathoothe
- Margin of victory: 4,836 (40.3 pp)

Serowe North is a constituency in the Central District represented by Baratiwa Mathoothe, a BPF MP in the National Assembly of Botswana since 2019.

== Constituency profile ==
Serowe North lies in the Central District and is primarily rural, with the main settlement being the village of Serowe. The constituency is part of the three historically safe BDP seats that flipped to the BPF and had an average swing of 76.7pp towards the BPF. This shift was attributed to the fact that the BaNgwato tribe, of which the Khama family is the royal family, resides in the Serowe area. Prior to Ian Khama's departure from the BDP, the constituency consistently voted for the party by significant margins. However, following the fallout between Ian Khama and President Mokgweetsi Masisi, Khama encouraged people in the Serowe region to vote for the newly formed BPF and this message strongly resonated with the locals.

Serowe North was the constituency of Botswana's first President, Seretse Khama, from 1965 until a constitutional amendment stated that the sitting president could not simultaneously be an elected member of the National Assembly in 1974. As such, it was traditionally always one of the BDP's safest strongholds in the country, with the party rarely obtaining less than 90% of the vote there from its establishment ahead of the inaugural 1965 elections until its last election in 1999 before its abolition ahead of the 2004 elections.

The constituency has the following localities:

1. Parts of Serowe
2. Paje
3. Mabeleapodi
4. Tshimoyapula

== Members of Parliament ==
Key: BDP BPF

Election	Winner
1965 election	Seretse Khama
1969 election	Seretse Khama
1974 election	Colin Blackbeard
1979 election	Colin Blackbeard
1984 election	Colin Blackbeard
1989 election	Roy Blackbeard
1994 election	Roy Blackbeard
1998 by-election	Ian Khama
1999 election	Ian Khama
2014 election	Kgotla Autlwetse
2019 election	Baratiwa Mathoothe
2024 election	Baratiwa Mathoothe

== Election results ==
=== 2024 election ===
General election 2024: Serowe North
Party	Candidate	Votes	%	±%
BPF	Baratiwa Mathoothe	7,635	63.66	+21.00
BDP	Ogaketse Mathware	2,799	23.34	−11.11
BCP	Matthews Batsalelwang	1,126	9.39	N/A
BRP	Kabelo Pusoetsile	433	3.71	N/A
Margin of victory		4,836	40.32	+32.11
Total valid votes		11,993	99.24	+0.27
Rejected ballots		92	0.76	−0.27
Turnout		12,085	81.49	−2.38
Registered electors		14,830		
BPF hold		Swing	+16.06	

=== 2019 election ===
General election 2019: Serowe North
Party	Candidate	Votes	%	±%
BPF	Baratiwa Mathoothe	5,394	42.66	N/A
BDP	Kgotla Autlwetse	4,356	34.45	–50.95
UDC	Keaobaka Kgano	1,656	13.10	+3.62
Independent	Dikgakgamatso Seretse	926	7.32	N/A
AP	Dods Selebego	312	2.47	N/A
Margin of victory		1,038	8.21	N/A
Total valid votes		12,644	98.97	+0.01
Rejected ballots		131	1.03	–0.01
Turnout		12,775	83.87	+2.38
Registered electors		15,231		
BPF gain from BDP		Swing	+46.81	

=== 2014 election ===
General election 2014: Serowe North
Party	Candidate	Votes	%
BDP	Kgotla Autlwetse	9,611	85.40
UDC	Dods Selebogo	1,067	9.48
BCP	Motswakhumo Basego	576	5.12
Margin of victory		8,544	75.92
Total valid votes		11,254	98.96
Rejected ballots		118	1.04
Turnout		11,372	81.49
Registered electors		13,955	
BDP notional hold			

=== 1999 election ===
General election 1999: Serowe North
Party	Candidate	Votes	%	±%
BDP	Ian Khama	5,430	92.02	+4.72
BNF	S. G. Ramaribana	329	4.74	−7.96
BCP	Toro Lesego	225	3.24	−9.46
Margin of victory		5,101	87.28	+12.68
Total valid votes		6,946	96.19	N/A
Rejected ballots		275	3.81	N/A
Turnout		7,221	73.27	+10.2
Registered electors		9,856		
BDP hold		Swing	+6.34	

=== 1994 election ===
General election 1994: Serowe North
Party	Candidate	Votes	%	±%
BDP	Roy Blackbeard	5,430	87.3	−5.17
BNF	Toro Lesego	790	12.7	+5.17
Margin of victory		4,640	74.6	−10.34
Turnout		6,220	63.07	−5.39
Registered electors		9,862		
BDP hold		Swing	−5.17	

=== 1989 election ===
General election 1989: Serowe North
Party	Candidate	Votes	%	±%
BDP	Roy Blackbeard	7,036	92.47	−3.1
BNF	Abednico Masalila	573	7.53	+3.1
Margin of victory		6,463	84.94	−6.2
Turnout		7,609	68.46	−15.54
Registered electors		11,114		
BDP hold		Swing	−3.1	

=== 1984 election ===
General election 1984: Serowe North
Party	Candidate	Votes	%	±%
BDP	Colin Blackbeard	8,033	95.57	−3.53
BNF	Modiri Khama	372	4.43	+3.53
Margin of victory		7,661	91.14	−7.06
Turnout		8,405	84.00	+24.54
Registered electors		10,006		
BDP hold		Swing	−3.53	

=== 1979 election ===
General election 1979: Serowe North
Party	Candidate	Votes	%	±%
BDP	Colin Blackbeard	4,352	99.10	+0.25
BNF	Todd E. Kuhlman	50	0.90	−0.25
Margin of victory		4,302	98.2	+0.5
Turnout		6,481	59.46	+22.42
Registered electors		10,900		
BDP hold		Swing	+0.25	

=== 1974 election ===
General election 1974: Serowe North
Party	Candidate	Votes	%
BDP	Colin Blackbeard	3,360	98.85
BNF	Todd E. Kuhlman	39	1.15
Margin of victory		3,321	97.7
Turnout		3,389	37.04
Registered electors		9,149	
BDP hold			

=== 1969 election ===
General election 1969: Serowe North
Party	Candidate	Votes	%
BDP	Seretse Khama	Walkover	N/A
Margin of victory		N/A	N/A
Registered electors		5,437	
BDP hold			

=== 1965 election ===
General election 1965: Kanye South
Party	Candidate	Votes	%
BDP	Seretse Khama	5,909	98.47
BIP	K. K. Motshedisi	53	0.88
BPP	K. T. Moletsane	39	0.65
Margin of victory		5,856	97.59
Turnout		6,001	N/A
Registered electors		N/A	
BDP win (new seat)			
