= Tati West =

Parliamentary constituency in North-East District, Botswana

- Single-member constituency for the National Assembly
- District: North-East
- Population: 30,910
- Major settlements: Masunga
- Area: 2,110 km^{2}

Current constituency
- Created: 1965
- Party: UDC
- Created from: North-East
- Abolished: 1974
- Re-established: 2004
- MP: Justin Hunyepa
- Margin of victory: 3,495 (26.0 pp)

Tati West is a constituency in the North-East District represented in the National Assembly of Botswana since 2024 by Justin Hunyepa a UDC MP.

The constituency existed between 1965 and 1974, when it was replaced by North-East constituency after two elections. It was restored in 2002 for the 2004 elections and acquired its current boundaries in 2012 with slight changes in 2022.

== Constituency profile ==
In the 1965 and 1969 elections the constituency voted for the opposition BPP candidate, Kenneth Nkhwa. After its re-establishment in 2004, it has remained a generally marginal seat for the BDP, with BPP (later an UDC coalition member) as main challenger. In 2019 its MP Biggie Butale defected from the BDP to become president of the Botswana Patriotic Front, but he decisively lost the seat in the election of the same year. It was won by the opposition Umbrella for Democratic Change in the 2024 election amongst a strong national swing against the BDP. The constituency, predominantly rural, encompasses the following villages:

1. Masunga
2. Vukwi
3. Kalakamati
4. Botalaote
5. Toteng
6. Mosojane
7. Moroka
8. Letsholathebe
9. Gulubane
10. Matenge

== Members of Parliament ==
Key: BPP BDP UDC

Election	Winner
1965 election	Kenneth Nkhwa
1969 election	Kenneth Nkhwa
2004 election	Mbiganyi Charles Tibone
2009 election	Mbiganyi Charles Tibone
2014 election	Biggie Butale
2019 election	Simon Moabi
2024 election	Justin Hunyepa

== Election results ==
General election 2024: Tati West
Party	Candidate	Votes	%	±%
UDC	Justin Hunyepa	6,713	49.99	+12.15
BDP	Simon Moabi	3,223	24.00	−25.33
BCP	Leonard Mutheto	2,679	19.95	N/A
BRP	Biggie Butale	813	6.05	N/A
Margin of victory		3,490	25.99	N/A
Total valid votes		13,428	99.37	−0.03
Rejected ballots		85	0.63	+0.03
Turnout		13,513	83.24	−5.40
Registered electors		16,233		
UDC gain from BDP		Swing	+18.74	

=== 2019 election ===
General election 2019: Tati West
Party	Candidate	Votes	%	±%
BDP	Simon Moabi	6,236	49.33	+6.40
UDC	Makhani Tshepo	4,783	37.84	+4.47
BPF	Biggie Butale	1,622	12.83	N/A
Margin of victory		1,453	11.49	+1.93
Total valid votes		12,641	99.40	+0.19
Rejected ballots		76	0.79	−0.19
Turnout		12,717	88.64	+3.30
Registered electors		14,346		
BDP gain from BPF		Swing	+5.44	

=== 2014 election ===
General election 2014: Tati West
Party	Candidate	Votes	%	±%
BDP	Biggie Butale	4,510	42.93	−8.99
UDC	Richard Gudu	3,506	33.37	−8.77
BCP	Phillip Bulawa	1,671	15.91	+9.97
Independent	Farayi Bonyongo	819	7.19	N/A
Margin of victory		1,004	9.56	−0.22
Total valid votes		10,506	98.43	−0.05
Rejected ballots		168	1.57	+0.05
Turnout		10,674	85.34	+9.43
Registered electors		12,507		
BDP hold		Swing	−8.88	

=== 2009 election ===
General election 2009: Tati West
Party	Candidate	Votes	%	±%
BDP	Mbiganyi Tibone	4,277	51.92	−5.64
BPP	Richard Gudu	3,471	42.14	+4.47
BAM	Christopher Phillime	489	5.94	N/A
Margin of victory		806	9.78	−10.11
Total valid votes		8,237	98.48	+0.43
Rejected ballots		127	1.52	−0.43
Turnout		8,364	75.91	−2.25
Registered electors		11,018		
BDP hold		Swing	−5.01	

=== 2004 election ===
General election 2004: Tati West
Party	Candidate	Votes	%
BDP	Mbiganyi Tibone	4,322	57.56
BPP	Richard Gudu	2,829	37.67
BCP	Albert Mosojane	357	4.77
Margin of victory		1,493	19.89
Total valid votes		7,509	98.05
Rejected ballots		149	1.95
Turnout		7,658	78.16
Registered electors		9,798	
BDP notional hold			

=== 1969 election ===
General election 1969: Tati West
Party	Candidate	Votes	%	±%
BPP	Kenneth Nkhwa	1,604	59.41	+7.76
BDP	G.E.N. Mannathoko	1,018	37.70	+11.62
BNF	Knight Maripe	78	2.78	N/A
Margin of victory		740	42.28	N/A
Turnout		2,700	60.29	N/A
Registered electors		4,478		
BPP hold		Swing	+9.69	

=== 1965 election ===
General election 1965: Tati West
Party	Candidate	Votes	%
BPP	Kenneth Nkhwa	2,006	51.65
BDP	J. Anderson	1,013	26.08
Independent	G. E. N. Mannathoko	789	20.31
BIP	A. M. Tshepe	77	1.96
Margin of victory		993	25.57
Turnout		3,884	N/A
Registered electors		N/A	
BPP win (new seat)			
