= Fatshe leno la rona =

National anthem of Botswana

English: This Land of Ours
- National anthem of Botswana
- Lyrics: Kgalemang Tumediso Motsete, 1962
- Music: Kgalemang Tumediso Motsete, 1962
- Adopted: 1966

Audio sample
- U.S. Navy Band instrumental version (one verse and chorus): file; help

"Fatshe leno la rona" (pronounced [ˈfat͡sʰɪ ˈlɛnʊ la ˈrʊna]; "This Land of Ours") is the national anthem of Botswana. The music was composed by Kgalemang Tumediso Motsete, who also authored the song's Tswana lyrics. It was adopted when the country became independent in 1966. Since independence, the song is sung occasionally during the country's important events such as Kgotla meetings, independence celebrations and other national events. The national anthem is highly respected to an extent that when it is sung movements are not allowed, people stand at attention, and security officers, like the police and soldiers, salute as a show of respect.

== History ==
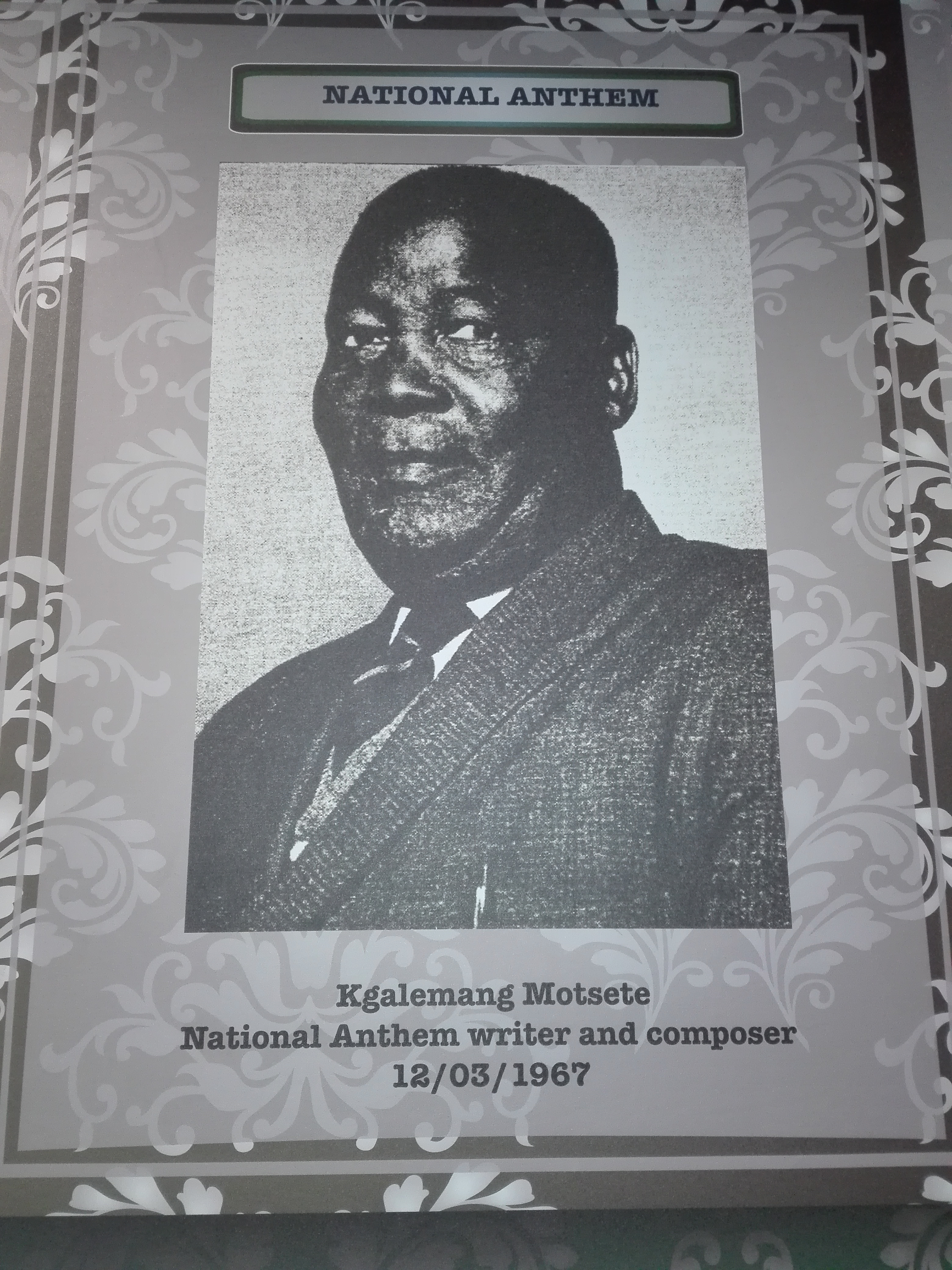
Kgalemang Tumediso (K.T) Motsete

From the late 19th-century until the height of decolonisation during the 1960s, Bechuanaland (as it was then known) was a protectorate of the United Kingdom within its colonial empire. In the run up to independence, proposals for the national symbols for the future country were made. Although the flag and the coat of arms were straightforward choices, the selection of the national anthem became a source of contention. Despite its popularity, "Fatshe leno la rona" was reportedly not the frontrunner because its composer – Kgalemang Tumediso Motsete, who possessed "a music degree from London" – was the co-founder and leader of the opposition Botswana People's Party (BPP), which at the time was a radical faction. Instead, the government wanted to maintain "Morena boloka Sechaba sa Etsho" ("Lord protect the nation of the world") as the anthem after independence. Although the latter song was considered by some government officials to be a "colonial song", it was in fact embraced by nationalists in the south of the continent in their struggle against colonialism, as well as in South Africa during the apartheid era.

"Motsete drafted the song in Ghana and when we were coming back to Botswana he made us sing it."

— Motsamai Mpho reflecting on how the anthem was created by his fellow BPP co-founder.

In an interview with the national newspaper Mmegi, fellow BPP co-founder Motsamai Mpho stated that "Fatshe leno la rona" was written in 1962. He stated that Motsete had penned the anthem in Ghana, where he was inspired by the songs of liberation from that country. Indeed, Mpho asserts that himself, Motsete, and three others affiliated with the BPP were the first people to sing the anthem while returning home on a flight from a Pan-Africanist conference held in Accra that same year.

According to the biographer of Gobe Matenge, a former Permanent Secretary in the Ministry of Home Affairs, he was one of several civil servants – including the future vice president Peter Mmusi – that compelled the Motswana government to adopt "Fatshe leno la rona" as the anthem of the independent nation. In order to ascertain the opinion of the general public on the matter, the government transmitted all of the contending hymns over Radio Botswana. However, Matenge's group was able to obtain recordings of these songs for themselves and air them in front of quasi-town hall gatherings held in major settlements like Lobatse, Molepolole, and Mafikeng, in addition to the capital Gaborone. They strategically played "Fatshe leno la rona" as the last song – which in theory would increase the likelihood that the audience would remember the tune – while having their organisers add words of praise for it in an attempt to sway the crowd's opinion in favour of that hymn. At the end of the exercise, they would circulate a boilerplate form letter articulating the author's viewpoint of "Fatshe leno la rona" being their favourite candidate for national anthem. This was done because of the low levels of literacy in Botswana at the time. Of the multitude of letters sent to the Department of Information and Broadcasting, the vast majority of them expressed an inclination towards the aforementioned song.

However, this account has been disputed by George Winstanley, the first clerk to the Cabinet after independence. He insists that stories about how the government was pressured into ratifying "Fatshe leno la rona" are simply inaccurate, especially in light of the fact that the civil servants who supposedly did this were merely "junior executive officers" at the time. Rather, Winstanley remembers how Seretse Khama initially leaned towards selecting "Morena" ("Lord keep the nation of the world"), before he convinced Khama to select a hymn that was "unique to Botswana". Khama's deputy Quett Masire recalled how the future president wanted an anthem that was enduring and would transcend the political spectrum, so that it would not be changed when another political party assumed power in the future.

A total of seven hymns were shortlisted as finalists for the new national anthem. Motsete actually made another submission – "Botswana Fatshe le Lentle" (meaning "Botswana, a Beautiful Country") – in addition to "Fatshe leno la rona"; the two compositions finished runner-up and winner, respectively. The latter was officially adopted in 1966, the year the country gained independence. One of the first public occasions where the anthem was played was at the flag hoisting ceremony at midnight on 30 September 1966, marking the end of British rule over Botswana.

=== Modern day ===
The anthem is normally sung in four part vocal harmony. It is performed at events, both at tribal and at national level. For instance, it is sung before traditional village meetings (kgotla).

== Lyrics ==
The lyrics of "Fatshe leno la rona" alludes to God and his standing as the bestower of the nation's land. It also promotes values such as love of the country, and accord among the different ethnic groups residing in the state. The author is saying that this land is a gift from our forefathers and pleads that it must remain peaceful. He further suggests that the people of Botswana should work collectively to build up the nation, both men and women. He does not only call for cooperation but also commitment. Finally, the song echoes how beautiful the name Botswana is, expressly noting that this beauty is from the unity and stability of Botswana.

A usual rendition of the anthem consists of the first verse followed by the chorus; however the second verse and chorus may also be performed as well.

Setswana lyrics

I
Fatshe leno la rona
Ke mpho ya Modimo,
Ke boswa jwa borraetsho;
a le nne ka kagiso.

Chorus:
Tsogang, tsogang! Banna, tsogang!
Emang, basadi, emang, tlhagafalang!
Re kopanele go direla
Lefatshe la rona.

II
'Ina lentle la tumo
la tšhaba ya Botswana,
Ka kutlwano le kagisano,
e bopagantswe mmogo.

𝄆 Chorus 𝄇

IPA transcription (Note: See Help:IPA and Tswana language § Phonology.)

1
[ˈfa.t͡sʰɪ ˈlɛ.nʊ la ˈrʊ.na]
[kɪ m.pʰɔ ja mʊ.ˈdi.mʊ]
[kɪ ˈbʊs.wa d͡ʒwa bɔr.ra.ˈɛ.t͡sʰʊ]
[a lɪ‿n.nɛ ka ka.ˈχi.sɔ]

[ˈt͡sʊ.χaŋ ˈt͡sʊ.χaŋ ˈban.na ˈt͡sʊ.χaŋ]
[ˈɛ.maŋ ba.ˈsa.di ˈɛ.maŋ t͡ɬʰha.χa.ˈfa.laŋ]
[rɪ kɔ.pa.ˈnɛ.lɛ χʊ di.ˈrɛ.la]
[lɪ.ˈfa.t͡sʰɪ la ˈrʊ.na]

2
[ˈi.na ˈlɪn.t͡ɬɛ la ˈtu.mɔ]
[la ˈt͡ʃʰa.ba ja bʊ.ˈt͡swa.na]
[ka ku.ˈt͡ɬwa.nɔ lɪ ka.χi.ˈsa.nɔ]
[ɪ bʊ.pa.ˈχan.t͡swɛ‿m.ˈmɔ.χɔ]

Literal English translation

I
This land of ours,
Is a gift from God,
An inheritance from our forefathers;
May it always be at peace.

Chorus:
Awake, awake, O men, awake!
Arise, O women, arise! Be energized,
Let us work together to serve,
Our land.

II
Beautiful name of fame
Of the nation of Botswana
Through harmonious relations and reconciliation
Bound together

𝄆 Chorus 𝄇

Poetic English translation (Note: Poetic license has been taken in an attempt to make it rhyme in English. This is not a literal translation.)

I
This land of ours,
It is the gift of God,
It is the inheritance of our fathers;
may he be in peace.

Chorus:
Awake, awake! Men, wake up!
Stand up, women, stand up!
Join us in serving
Our world.

II
A beautiful name of fame,
of the people of Botswana,
In harmony and peace,
it is woven together.

𝄆 Chorus 𝄇
