= Francistown (Botswana constituency) =

Parliamentary constituency in the North-East District of Botswana, 1974–1994

- Former Single-member constituency for the National Assembly
- Boundary of Francistown in Botswana
- District: North-East
- Major settlements: Francistown

Former constituency
- Created: 1974
- Abolished: 1994
- Created from: Francistown/Tati East
- Replaced by: Francistown East; Francistown West

Francistown was a constituency in North-East District represented by an MP in the National Assembly of Botswana from 1974 to 1994. The constituency, which encompassed Francistown city and the southern part of the North-East District, was created for the 1974 general elections and was dissolved in the 1992 redistribution of boundaries, when it was divided in two new constituencies: Francistown East and Francistown West.

As an urban constituency, Francistown generally tended to vote for opposition parties, but the split of votes between the BPP and the BNF made it easier for the BDP to narrowly win the constituency in the 1984 and 1989 elections.

== Members of Parliament ==
Key: BPP BDP

Election	Winner
1974 election	Philip Matante
1979 election	Patrick Balopi
1984 election	Patrick Balopi
1989 election	Patrick Balopi

== Election results ==
=== 1989 election ===
General election 1989: Francistown
Party	Candidate	Votes	%	±%
BDP	Patrick Balopi	5,258	44.84	−0.45
BPP	Michael Modise	3,732	31.83	−12.18
BNF	Raphael Sikwane	2,735	23.33	+13.56
Margin of victory		1,526	13.01	+11.73
Turnout		11,725	67.79	−8.95
Registered electors		17,297		
BDP hold		Swing	+5.87	

=== 1984 election ===
General election 1984: Francistown
Party	Candidate	Votes	%	±%
BDP	Patrick Balopi	4,613	45.29	−7.86
BPP	John Mosojane	4,483	44.01	−2.84
BNF	Nehemiah Modubule	995	9.77	N/A
BPU	Aaron Omphile	95	0.93	N/A
Margin of victory		130	1.28	−5.02
Turnout		10,186	76.74	+20.93
Registered electors		13,274		
BDP hold		Swing	−2.51	

=== 1979 election ===
General election 1979: Francistown
Party	Candidate	Votes	%	±%
BDP	Patrick Balopi	1,867	53.15	+5.7
BPP	Philip Matante	1,646	46.85	−5.7
Margin of victory		221	6.29	N/A
Turnout		3,513	55.81	+24.43
Registered electors		6,295		
BDP gain from BPP		Swing	+5.7	

=== 1974 election ===
General election 1974: Francistown
Party	Candidate	Votes	%
BPP	Philip Matante	1,101	52.55
BDP	J. M. Ntuane	994	47.45
Margin of victory		107	5.1
Turnout		2,195	31.38
Registered electors		6,996	
BPP win (new seat)			
