= Francistown/Tati East =

Parliamentary constituency in the North-East District of Botswana, 1965–1974

- Former Single-member constituency for the National Assembly
- Boundary of Francistown/Tati East in Botswana
- District: North-East
- Major settlements: Francistown

Former constituency
- Created: 1965
- Abolished: 1974
- Replaced by: Francistown; North-East

Francistown/Tati East was a constituency in North-East District represented by an MP in the National Assembly of Botswana from 1965 to 1974. The constituency, which encompassed Francistown city and the southern part of the North-East District, was created for the first National Assembly election in 1965 and was dissolved in 1972 redistribution of boundaries, when a single constituency was created for Francistown and the rural areas of the District were unified into a separate constituency, North East.

The constituency was represented throughout its existence by Philip Matante, leader of the Botswana People's Party and first Leader of the Opposition in the National Assembly.

== Members of Parliament ==
Key: BPP

| Election | Winner |
|---|---|
| 1965 election | Philip Matante |
| 1969 election | Philip Matante |

== Election results ==
=== 1969 election ===
General election 1969: Francistown/Tati East
| Party | Candidate | Votes | % | ±% |
|---|---|---|---|---|
| BPP | Philip Matante | 2,361 | 69.87 | −7.40 |
| BDP | Peter Maruping | 1,265 | 30.13 | +7.40 |
| Margin of victory | | 1,096 | 39.74 | −16.28 |
| Turnout | | 3,626 | 57.34 | N/A |
| Registered electors | | 6,324 | | |
| BPP hold | | Swing | −7.40 | |

=== 1965 election ===
General election 1965: Francistown/Tati East
| Party | Candidate | Votes | % |
|---|---|---|---|
| BPP | Philip Matante | 4,415 | 77.27 |
| BDP | G. Segopolo | 1,214 | 21.25 |
| BIP | R. Sewela | 85 | 1.49 |
| Margin of victory | | 3,201 | 56.02 |
| Turnout | | 5,714 | N/A |
| Registered electors | | N/A | |
| BPP win (new seat) | | | |
