= President Khama =

President Khama may refer to:

- Seretse Khama (1921–1980), the first president of Botswana, in office from 1966 to 1980
- Ian Khama (born 1953), first-born son of Seretse and Ruth Williams Khama and president of Botswana from 2008 to 2018
