= Kebatshabile Disele =

Motswana politician

Minister of Home Affairs
- In office 1979–1984
- Preceded by: Peter Mmusi
- Succeeded by: Englishman Kgabo

Member of the National Assembly
- In office 1974–1984

Personal details
- Born: 18 June 1924 Kanye, Bechuanaland

Kebatshabile Lorato Disele was a Botswana politician. She was jointly the first female member of the National Assembly, serving from 1974 to 1984. She also served as Minister of Home Affairs from 1979 to 1984.

== Biography ==
Disele was born in Kanye in June 1924. She attended Kanye primary school between 1930 and 1941, and then Tigerkloof Institute in South Africa from 1942 to 1948. In 1949 she married Kago Disele, with whom she had four children. She briefly worked as a teacher in 1952 and then as a clerk from 1957 to 1964. She joined the post office in 1964, initially as a part-time postmistress. After a spell as an accounts assistant from 1966 to 1967, she reverted to being a postmistress until 1972 when she became deputy controller of the Post Office Savings Bank.

Following the 1974 general elections Disele was one of two women indirectly elected to Parliament alongside Gaositwe K. T. Chiepe. A member of the Botswana Democratic Party, she was re-elected following the 1979 elections, after which she was appointed Minister of Home Affairs. She remained an MP and minister until 1984. She contested the Ngwaketse South constituency in the 1984 elections, losing to the Botswana National Front candidate.
