= Simon Moabi =

Motswana politician

Member of Parliament for Tati West
- In office 5 November 2019 – 5 September 2024
- Preceded by: Biggie Butale
- Succeeded by: Justin Hunyepa

Personal details
- Party: Botswana Democratic Party

Simon Moabi is a Motswana politician and a former Member of Parliament for Tati West in the 12th Parliament of Botswana from 2019 to 2024.

== Electoral history ==
=== 2019 ===
General election 2019: Tati West
Party	Candidate	Votes	%	±%
BDP	Simon Moabi	6,236	49.33	+6.40
UDC	Makhani Tshepo	4,783	37.84	+4.47
BPF	Biggie Butale	1,622	12.83	N/A
Margin of victory		1,453	11.49	+1.93
Total valid votes		12,641	99.40	+0.19
Rejected ballots		76	0.79	−0.19
Turnout		12,717	88.64	+3.30
Registered electors		14,346		
BDP gain from BPF		Swing	+5.44	

=== 2024 ===
Incumbent Moabi was criticized for not speaking at Parliament meetings, ranking first on a list of "silent and underperforming MPs". He was also criticized by Mmegi magazine for unwisely unilaterally using funds appropriated for his constituency on a road linking Mbalambi, Sekakangwe, and Kalakamat due to the fact that the funds were P 10 million, and the most conservative estimates for the road were that it would cost at least 10 times that amount. He defended his decision by explaining that the fund was supposed to be used for the whole constituency and not split up by village, dismissing claims that the funds were becoming a motshelo.

UDP candidate Justin Hunyepa complained that the ruling BDP was "sabotaging" his campaign by removing his campaign posters from villages like Masunga and Mlambakwena using state resources. He also complained that Moabi's posters were funded by the government and that he had to pay for his own.

During the campaign, Moabi defended president Mokgweetsi Masisi's foreign trips and successes on fighting livestock diseases such as Foot-and-mouth disease as well as the COVID-19 pandemic in Botswana.

Mbakiso Mukokomani, who lost the BDP primary to Moabi, alleged electoral fraud due to the fact that some ballot boxes were not counted.

General election 2024: Tati West
Party	Candidate	Votes	%	±%
UDC	Justin Hunyepa	6,713	49.99	+12.15
BDP	Simon Moabi	3,223	24.00	−25.33
BCP	Leonard Mutheto	2,679	19.95	N/A
BRP	Biggie Butale	813	6.05	N/A
Margin of victory		3,490	25.99	N/A
Total valid votes		13,428	99.37	−0.03
Rejected ballots		85	0.63	+0.03
Turnout		13,513	83.24	−5.40
Registered electors		16,233		
UDC gain from BDP		Swing	+18.74	
