= 1961 Bechuanaland general election =

General elections were held in the Bechuanaland Protectorate in May 1961.

== Background ==
Following a new constitution enacted in December 1960, governance was split between a Legislative Council and an advisory African Council. The Legislative Council had just over 30 members; 10 colonial officials, 10 blacks, 10 whites, one Asian and some co-opted members. The 10 black members were elected by the African Council, whilst the 10 whites and the Asian member were all directly elected.

The African Council consisted of the eight heads of the Tswana chiefdoms and some elected members.

== Results ==
Seretse Khama received the most votes in the election for the black representatives. The Legislative Council was inaugurated in June 1961.
