= Serara Selelo-Mogwe =

Botswana nurse and academic (1927–2020)

Serara Segarona Selelo-Mogwe (1927 – September 2, 2020), also known as Serara Kupe-Mogwe, was a pioneering nurse and academic in Botswana. After serving as the country's first black, female chief nursing officer, she became the first Motswana woman to earn a doctorate and become a professor.

== Early life and education ==
Serara Selelo was born in 1927 in Bobonong, a town in Botswana's Central District. She was the oldest child of Phofuetsile Selelo and Mokgadi Selelo.

During her childhood years, secondary education was difficult to come by in her home region, so she traveled to the Tiger Kloof Educational Institute in South Africa for high school. Then, in the 1940s, she went to study at McCord Zulu Hospital, where she earned a diploma in nursing and midwifery.

== Career ==
Though she did not have formal teaching qualifications, Selelo-Mogwe became first black nursing teacher at McCord Zulu Hospital. Then, despite racial prejudice that made it difficult for black students in Botswana, she was accepted to the University of Natal. But she ended up not being able to attend after getting married in 1960 to Elliot Kupe, with whom she had a daughter, Pearl.

However, she persisted in pursuing an education, applying for a scholarship to study nursing at the University of Edinburgh. After spending two years there, she transferred to the University of Ottawa in Canada, where her husband was working, and she graduated with a bachelor's degree from that institution in 1966. She would go on to teach at that university.

Selelo-Mogwe returned to Botswana, but she found no one there would hire a black woman for any higher-level position; instead, she moved to Zambia, where she opened the country's first nursing school in Kitwe.

After two years in Zambia, she returned to Canada so her husband could continue his studies there, but she did not stay for long, as her friends back home encouraged her to apply to be Botswana's chief nursing officer. She was appointed to the post in 1969, becoming the first black woman to serve as the country's chief nursing officer, a position she would hold for 10 years.

As chief nursing officer, she had a major impact on updating the country's nursing education system and medical infrastructure. In 1978, she won a campaign to give nurses access to tertiary education through a degree program at the University of Botswana, where she became the first head of its nursing school. Selelo-Mogwe is considered the first Motswana woman to become a full professor.

She is also considered the first Motswana woman to earn a Ph.D., holding a master's degree and doctorate in nursing education from Columbia University Teacher's College. She also obtained master's degrees in education and arts from Columbia University in 1979.

Selelo-Mogwe was a founding member of the Nurses Association of Botswana, the precursor of today's Botswana Nurses Union.

== Later years ==
In 1993, Selelo-Mogwe published a memoir of her experiences as Botswana's chief nursing officer titled An Uneasy Walk to Quality: The Evolution of Black Nursing Education.

She eventually retired to a farm outside Pitsane, a village in Botswana's Southern District, with her second husband, the politician and diplomat Archibald Mogwe, whom she married in 1997.

In 2020, she died at the age of 93.
