= Biggie Butale =

Motswana politician (born 1972)

President of the Botswana Republican Party
- Incumbent
- Assumed office 14 November 2023
- Preceded by: Position established

President of the Botswana Patriotic Front
- In office 6 July 2019 – 13 July 2023
- Preceded by: Position established
- Succeeded by: Mephato Reatile

Member of Parliament for Tati West
- In office 28 October 2014 – 28 August 2019
- Preceded by: Charles Tibone
- Succeeded by: Simon Moabi

Personal details
- Born: Biggie Ganda Butale; 3 August 1972 (age 53) Gaborone, Botswana
- Party: Botswana Republican Party (since 2023)
- Other political affiliations: Botswana Democratic Party (1992–2019); Botswana Patriotic Front (2019–2023)
- Children: 5
- Parent(s): Dick Kabelo Butale; Janet Butale
- Education: University of Botswana (LLB)
- Profession: Lawyer; Pastor

Biggie Ganda Butale (born 3 August 1972) is a Motswana politician and the current leader of the Botswana Republican Party (BRP) since 14 November 2023. He previously served as the Member of Parliament for Tati West in the 11th Parliament from 2014 to 2019. Butale, the founding President of the Botswana Patriotic Front from July 2019 to July 2023, was ousted following a leadership dispute. Subsequently, he established the BRP on 14 November 2023.

== Early life and education ==
Butale was born on 3 August 1972 in Gaborone and attended secondary school at Gaborone Secondary College from 1990 to 1996. He joined the Botswana Democratic Party at 18 in 1990. He pursued his studies at the University of Botswana, earning an LLB in 1997. His professional journey included roles such as serving as a Lawyer at the Attorney General's Chambers (State Counsel) from 1996 to 1998 and at Moupo Motswagole and Dingake Attorneys from 1999 to 2000. Additionally, he held the position of managing director at a security company from 2004 to 2014.

== Political career ==
Butale began his political career after being elected as a Member of Parliament for the Tati West constituency in the 2014 elections. In addition, he served as a Member of the Pan African Parliament from 2014 to 2016 and concurrently held the position of chairman for the Parliamentary Committee on Justice, Defence & Security. During this period, he was also a Member of the Public Accounts Committee and the Intelligence and State Security Services Committee of the Parliament of Botswana. From 2016 to 2019, Butale assumed the role of Assistant Minister for Investment, Trade & Industry.

In 2014, Butale was elected as MP for the Tati West parliamentary seat. He quickly rose through the ranks, challenging then-Vice President of Botswana, Mokgweetsi Masisi for the BDP chairmanship in 2015. He served as an assistant minister in various ministries, but his political ambitions were often met with resistance. Following his suspension and loss in the 2018 BDP primaries, Butale co-founded the Botswana Patriotic Front (BPF), a splinter party of the Botswana Democratic Party, with former President Ian Khama as its patron in 2019. The BPF went on to win three seats, all in the Serowe area, marking the first time they were won by an opposition party in history. However, he lost his Tati West seat to his successful primary challenger, Simon Moabi of the BDP.

After a long legal battle for his position as party president, Butale was ultimately ousted from the BPF and went on to form the Christian democratic Botswana Republican Party in November 2023.

== Political positions ==
As a pastor, Butale is known for his Christian faith and social conservatism. He is a staunch opponent of the legalization of abortion, condemns homosexuality and led a crusade against LGBTQ individuals and sex workers.

== Controversies ==
In 2017, Butale became the target of a complex political plot involving a fabricated P130,000 bribery case. The scheme involved using a lookalike to receive the bribe money from a hotel representative while being filmed by operatives believed to be affiliated with the Directorate on Intelligence and Security Services (DISS). The motive behind the plot was allegedly to damage Butale's reputation and hinder his campaign for the Deputy Secretary General position within the BDP. However, the Directorate on Corruption and Economic Crime (DCEC) intervened and thwarted the plot. Despite pressure to make an immediate arrest, DCEC officers, saw through the inconsistencies in the evidence and suspected foul play, forcing the plotters to abandon their plan.

Butale, who had been convinced that the Directorate of Intelligence and Security was trailing him since before the 2019 elections, encountered the Botswana Unified Revenue Service later that year. Upon returning from South Africa at the Ramotswa border post, he and his wife faced interrogation by customs officials, who alleged that they were carrying 'undisclosed and undeclared' amounts of money in their car.

Customs seized the vehicle, and despite a search the following day, no evidence was found. Butale, unfazed by the events, informed the media that he had been shadowed to Sandton, South Africa. When questioned about the money in his possession, he initially stated that his wife had around R20,000, which he acknowledged was not declared. However, after the final car search, Butale revealed that BURS had recovered R41,800, contradicting the R20,000 mentioned the previous day. At that time, Butale asserted that the Botswana government had humiliated him by exposing his undergarments in public.

In 2021, Butale faced allegations of sexual assault. The alleged sexual assault was not immediately reported to the police. The victim, a 24-year-old university student, cited fear of being disbelieved without evidence. After the assault, she confided in a friend who mentioned the difficulty of reporting without evidence. Later, a BPF member discouraged her from speaking out, and the trauma led her to take time off. She eventually approached BPF's National Executive Committee, seeking an apology from Butale rather than legal action. The university student ultimately decided not to press charges. Butale argues that the allegations were part of a calculated effort by his adversaries, attempting to create a damaging narrative that ultimately failed to materialize. He suspected political motives, previously implicating ex-President and BPF patron Ian Khama.
