= David Magang =

Motswana politician (born 1938)

David N. Magang

Personal details
- Born: c. 1938 (age 87–88) Botswana
- Education: University of London
- Profession: lawyer, businessman and politician.

David N. Magang (born 1938) is a Botswana lawyer, businessman and politician. Trained at the University of London, he was the first Botswana native to open a private law practice in the nation. A member of the ruling Botswana Democratic Party Magang was Member of Parliament for Kweneng East/Lentsweletau Constituency from 1979 to 2002.

Magang was also Governor of the African Development Bank from 1989 to 1992. After leaving government Magang became a successful property developer, creating the upper class Gaborone suburb of Phakalane. He wrote a successful and controversial 2008 autobiography The Magic of Perseverance.

In 2012, American journalist, Peter Musurlian of Globalist Films, completed an Emmy-winning documentary on Botswana, which he shot in December 2002. David Magang was instrumental in many of the shoots in Botswana and he was featured throughout the film, which aired in Burbank, California and is available on YouTube.

== Rankings ==
He held a number of high-ranking ministry portfolios under presidents Quett Masire and Festus Mogae, including Minister of Mineral Resources and Water Affairs (1994–97) and Minister of Works, Transport & Communications (1992–94, 1998–2001).

== Education ==
Trained at the University of London.

== Family life ==
David Magang married his wife, Dorcas in 20 December 1969 and together have three children, two sons and one daughter.The First born being Lesang, then Thola and lastly Bonang.

== Achievements ==
After leaving government Magang became a successful property developer, creating the upper class Gaborone suburb of Phakalane. He wrote a successful and controversial 2008 autobiography The Magic of Perseverance.
