= Setlhabelo Modukanele =

Motswana politician

Setlhabelo Naser Modukanele

Deputy Minister of Local Government and Rural Development of Botswana
- Incumbent
- Assumed office 13 February 2022
- President: Mokgweetsi Masisi

Personal details
- Born: Botswana
- Party: Botswana Democratic Party

Setlhabelo Naser Modukanele is a Motswana politician and educator. He is the current Deputy Minister of Local Government and Rural Development in Botswana, having been appointed to the position in 2019 by the current president of Botswana, Mokgweetsi Masisi. His term began on 13 February 2022.

Awards and achievements
Preceded by	Deputy Minister of Local Government and Rural Development of Botswana	Succeeded by
