= Kabo Morwaeng =

Motswana politician

Kabo Neale Schele Morwaeng
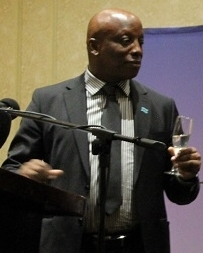

Minister for State President of Botswana
- In office 13 February 2022 – 1 November 2024
- President: Mokgweetsi Masisi

Personal details
- Born: Botswana
- Party: Botswana Democratic Party

Kabo Neale Schele Morwaeng is a Motswana politician and educator. He is former Minister for State President in Botswana, having been appointed to the position in 2019 by the current president of Botswana, Mokgweetsi Masisi. His term began on 13 February 2022, and ended on 1 November 2024.

Awards and achievements
Preceded by	Minister for State President of Botswana	Succeeded by
