= Ethnic groups in Botswana =

The people of the country called Botswana are all referred to as Batswana(pl)/ Motswana(s) in reference to the country name or the land they all hail from, that is regardless of ethnicity, language, skin colour or heritage.

The population of Botswana can be best divided into a number of ethnicities with the ethnic Tswana being the largest followed by other ethnicities who speak Setswana as a secondary language. The ethnic Tswana populace are concentrated mostly in the southern, South-eastern as well as Central parts of the country and are split up among eight tribes: Bangwato, Bakwena, Bangwaketse, Bakgatla, Barolong, Batlokwa, Balete and Batawana.

The following ethnicity would be the ethnic Kalanga people populations who are found in the central, northern and north-eastern parts of the country. The Kalanga ethnicity is shared by a number of tribes namely: Lilima / Bawumbe, Talaote tribe, Nambya people & Banoka. These various groups of people all speak different dialects of the Kalanga language.

The third ethnicity is the San(Khoi-San) people consisting of numerous sub-groups. The people are most dominantly found in the formerly Kgalagadi District as well as Ghanzi districts. Other populations can be found in other parts of the country although they normally speak the languages of their closest neighbour tribes. The story of the Basarwa is a sad one as they are a people who have for long been nomadic as well as hunters and gatherers and it is for this reason a lot of them have not been able to hang onto their culture and normally end up being assimilated into the Bantu people they normally settle next to. Over the years their populations have seen a great decline in all the areas and countries they are found in and they continue to dwindle. It is for this reason the governments of the countries are trying to conserve what is left of their cultures & traditions.

Other tribes would be the Batswapong and Babirwa people who despite sharing linguistic similarities are different and unique in their cultures as well as having different histories. The two are found in the Central Districts of Botswana alongside Bangwato and Bakalanga people.

Botswana as a country also has the native Bakgalagadi population who are also found in the Kgalagadi & Ghanzi districts. Bakgalagadi are made up of a number of tribes like Bashaga, Barolong, Bangologa, Babolaangwe, etc and they speak the Shekgalahari language which is believed to have been formed through the interactions of the Early ethnic Tswana groups with different San(Basarwa) tribes.

The country does also have the Herero people people (incl. Ovambanderu), the Basubiya, Mbukushu as well as Bayei and all of them being situated in the North Western parts of the country alongside the ethnic Batawana and Bananzwa people.

Botswana also has small non-black populations across the country. The most noticeable of these people include those of British ancestry, Afrikaans-speaking people, and Asian populations. Most of the people from these groups are highly urbanised and therefore typically live in cities, towns or urban villages.

The country's demographics are Tswana 79%, Kalanga 11%, Basarwa 3% and other 7% (including Kgalagadi, Indians and White people).

== People of Botswana ==
All citizens of Botswana-regardless of colour, ancestry or tribal affiliation are known as Batswana (plural) or Motswana (singular). In the lingua franca of Tswana, tribal groups are usually denoted with the prefix 'ba', which means 'the people of...'.Therefore, the Herero are known as Baherero, and the Kgalagadi as Bakgalagadi, and so on. Botswana's eight major tribes are represented in the House of Chiefs, an advisory legislative body.

=== Tswana people ===
The Tswana are the largest ethnic group in Botswana.

=== Bakalanga ===
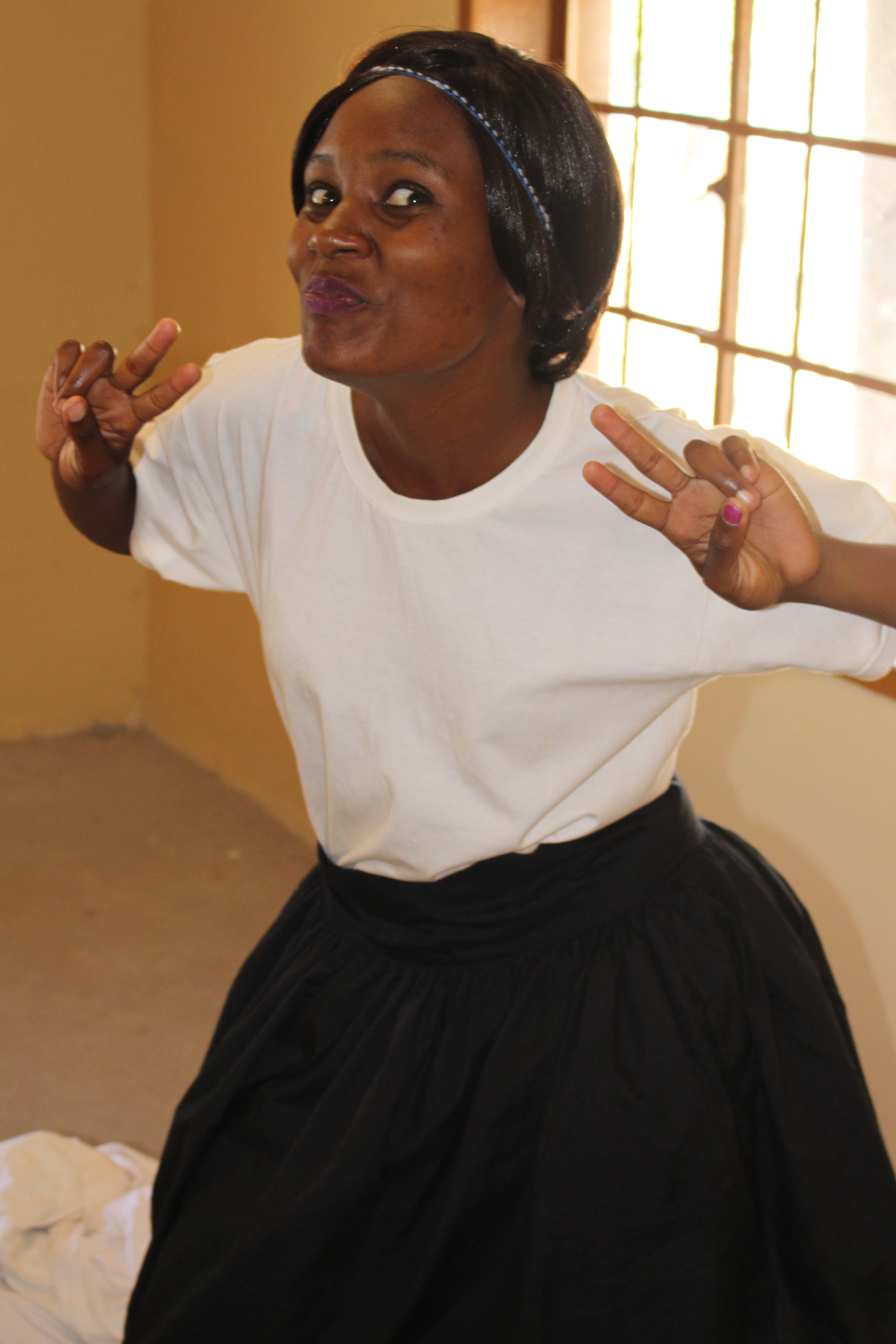
Kalanga woman

The second largest ethnic group are the Bakalanga, who mainly live in northeastern, north central as well as central parts of Botswana and Western Zimbabwe and speak Kalanga. In Botswana they are based mainly, although not exclusively, around Francistown. Modern Bakalanga are descended from the Kingdom of Butua.

=== Herero ===
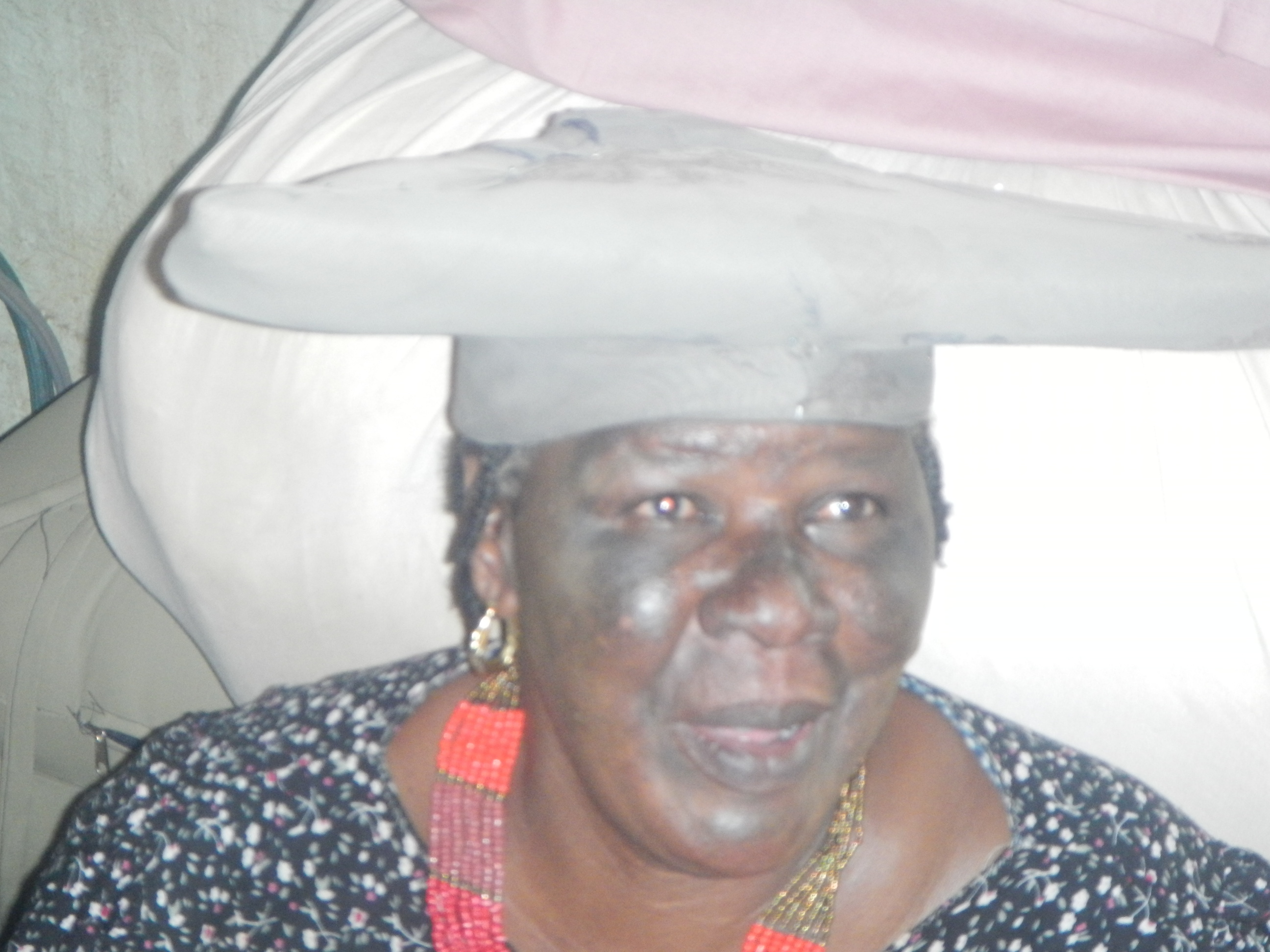
Herero woman in Otjinene village.

The Herero probably originated from the eastern or central Africa and migrated across the Kavango River into northeastern Namibia in the early 16th century. In 1884 the Germans took possession of German south west Africa (Namibia) and systematically appropriated Herero grazing lands. The ensuing conflict between the Germans and the Herero was to last for years, only ending in a calculated act of genocide which saw the remaining of the tribe flee across the border into Botswana. The refugees settled among the Batawana and were initially subjugated, but eventually regained their herds and independence. These days the Herero are among the wealthiest herders in Botswana.

=== Basubiya ===
The Basubiya, Wayeyi and Mbukushu are all riverine peoples scattered around the Chobe and Linyanti rivers and across the Okavango pan-handle. Their histories and migrations are a text book example of the ebb and flow of power and influence. For a long time, the Basubiya were the dominant force, pushing the Wayeyi from the Chobe river and into the Okavango after a little spat over a lion skin, so tradition says. The Basubiya were agriculturists and as such proved easy prey for the growing Lozi Empire (from modern Zambia), which in turned collapsed in 1865. They still live in the Chobe district.

=== Wayeyi (Bayei) ===
Originally from the same areas in Namibia and Angola as the Mbukushu, the Wyeyi moved south from the Chobe river into the Okavango Delta in the mid-18 century to avoid the growing conflict with the Basubiya.

== See also ==
- Languages of Botswana
- List of African ethnic groups
