= 1969 Botswana general election =

- 18 October 1969

31 of the 35 seats in the National Assembly 16 seats needed for a majority
- Registered: 140,428
- Turnout: 54.73% (of registered voters) (▼19.81pp); 37.46% (of eligible population) (▼32.00pp) (Note: National Study On Voter Apathy in Botswana (PDF). University of Botswana. IEC Botswana. 2022. p. 17.)
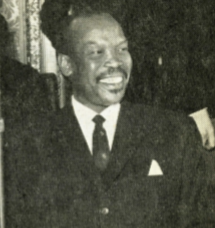

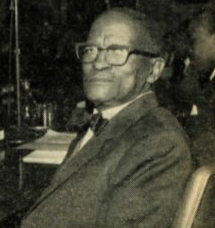

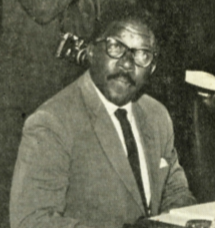

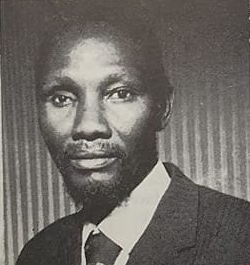
	Majority party	Minority party
Leader	Seretse Khama	Bathoen Gaseitsiwe
Party	BDP	BNF
Leader's seat	Serowe North	Kanye South
Last election	80.38%, 28 seats	–
Seats won	24	3
Seat change	▼4	New
Popular vote	52,518	10,410
Percentage	68.33%	13.54%
Swing	▼12.05pp	New
	Third party	Fourth party
Leader	Philip Matante	Motsamai Mpho
Party	BPP	BIP
Leader's seat	Francistown/Tati East	Okavango
Last election	14.18%, 3 seats	4.61%, 0 seats
Seats won	3	1
Seat change	Steady	▲1
Popular vote	9,964	4,601
Percentage	12.14%	5.99%
Swing	▼2.04pp	▲1.38pp
- Results by constituency
President before election
Seretse Khama
BDP
Elected President
Seretse Khama
BDP

General elections were held in Botswana on 18 October 1969, the first since independence in September 1966. The result was a second successive landslide victory for the Botswana Democratic Party (BDP), which won 24 of the 31 elected seats, including three in which its candidates ran unopposed.

== Campaign ==
A total of 77 candidates contested the elections. The BDP put up a full slate of 31 candidates, whilst the Botswana National Front fielded 21, the Botswana People's Party had 15, the Botswana Independence Party had nine, and there was also a single independent candidate.

The Botswana National Front was founded following the 1965 elections, and was headed by Kenneth Koma. However, Koma was overshadowed by Bathoen II, the paramount chief of the Bangwaketse. Bathoen abdicated his throne to become BNF president, after also resigning from the Ntlo ya Dikgosi, which he regarded as powerless. He was the first traditional leader to run in a national election.

== Results ==
Party	Votes	%	Seats	+/–
Botswana Democratic Party	52,518	68.33	24	–4
Botswana National Front	10,410	13.54	3	New
Botswana People's Party	9,329	12.14	3	0
Botswana Independence Party	4,601	5.99	1	+1
Indirectly-elected members			4	0
Total	76,858	100.00	35	0
Registered voters/turnout	140,428	–		
Source: Nohlen et al.
