= Archibald Mogwe =

Motswana politician (1921–2021)

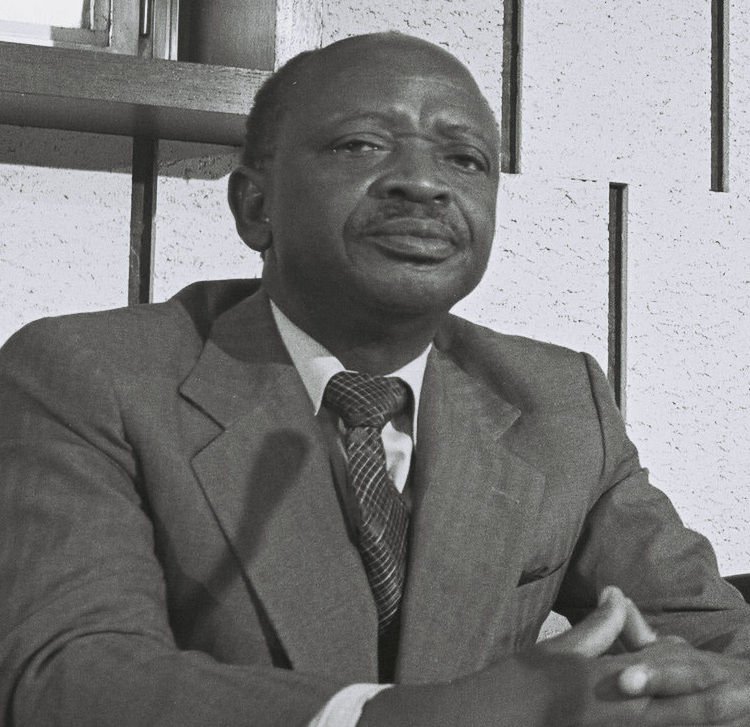

Minister of Foreign Affairs
- In office 1974 – 14 September 1984

Minister of Mineral Resources and Water Affairs
- In office 1985–1994

Personal details
- Born: 29 August 1921 Macheng o-o-Moswaana, Kanye, Bechuanaland Protectorate
- Died: 25 February 2021 (aged 99)
- Party: Botswana Democratic Party
- Spouse: (1) Lena Mosele Senakhomo. (2) Serara Khupe
- Children: 3
- Parent(s): Moruti Morutwana Mogwe, Mare Mogwe

Archibald Mooketsa Mogwe (29 August 1921 – 25 February 2021) was a politician and diplomat in Botswana. A member of parliament from Kanye, Mogwe served as the Foreign Minister from 1974 to 1984, and as the Minister of Mineral Resources and Water Affairs from 1985 to 1994, before serving as Ambassador to the United States. He was appointed to the latter post on 13 November 1995 and presented his credentials on 6 February 1996. Mogwe also played an important role as a facilitator in the Inter-Congolese Dialogue. Early on, he made his mark as the first Permanent Secretary to the Office of President Sir Seretse Khama.

With his first wife Lena Mosele Senakhomo (d. 1992) he had three children, daughter, Maleta Luna-Rosa Mogwe (b. 1954)(whom was married to the son of Rev. Albert Alfred Frank Lock, the second [and longest serving] Speaker of the National Assembly in Botswana and a missionary for the LMS); son, Hugh Lehlohonolo Moabi Mogwe (b. 1956 d. 2012); and daughter Alice Mogwe (b. 1961). From 1997 until her death in 2020, Mogwe was married to Botswana’s first female professor, Serara Selelo-Mogwe. Mogwe has six granddaughters, one grandson and two great-grandchildren.

He was known for his quick wit. Once, attending a SADCC conference in Lusaka, he was approached by Zambia's Finance Minister, who attempted a put down with "ah, my friend Mr Mogwe, the Minister for Water Affairs in Botswana. What are you doing here as a minister without portfolio; everyone knows Botswana has a no water resources." Archie, in rapid riposte, and after a second of contemplative thought, responded with "Much the same as you, my dear friend, the Minister of Finance for Zambia."

He died on February 25, 2021, at the age of 99.

== Honours ==
- Awarded the Order of the British Empire (OBE) on the eve of Botswana's independence in 1966
