= Botswana Republican Party =

Political party in Botswana

- President: Biggie Butale
- Founded: 14 November 2023; 2 years ago
- Split from: Botswana Patriotic Front
- Ideology: Christian democracy Social conservatism
- Political position: Centre-right to right-wing
- National Assembly: 0 / 57

The Botswana Republican Party (BRP) is a Christian-democratic political party in Botswana led by former Tati West MP, Biggie Butale. It was founded in 2023 as a result of a split from the Botswana Patriotic Front (BPF) following a prolonged leadership battle between Butale and the BPF. This battle ultimately led to Butale's expulsion from the BPF and the foundation of the BRP. The Africa Report described the party as having "Christian conservative leanings as Butale, a pastor, opposes homosexuality and the legalisation of abortion". They participated in the 2024 Botswana general election, which was their first.

== Electoral history ==
=== National Assembly ===
Election	Party leader	Votes	%	Seats	+/–	Position	Result
2024	Biggie Butale	3,212	0.38%	0 / 61	New	▲5th	Extra-parliamentary
