= Gaositwe Chiepe =

Botswanan politician and diplomat (1922–2025)

Gaositwe Chiepe MBE
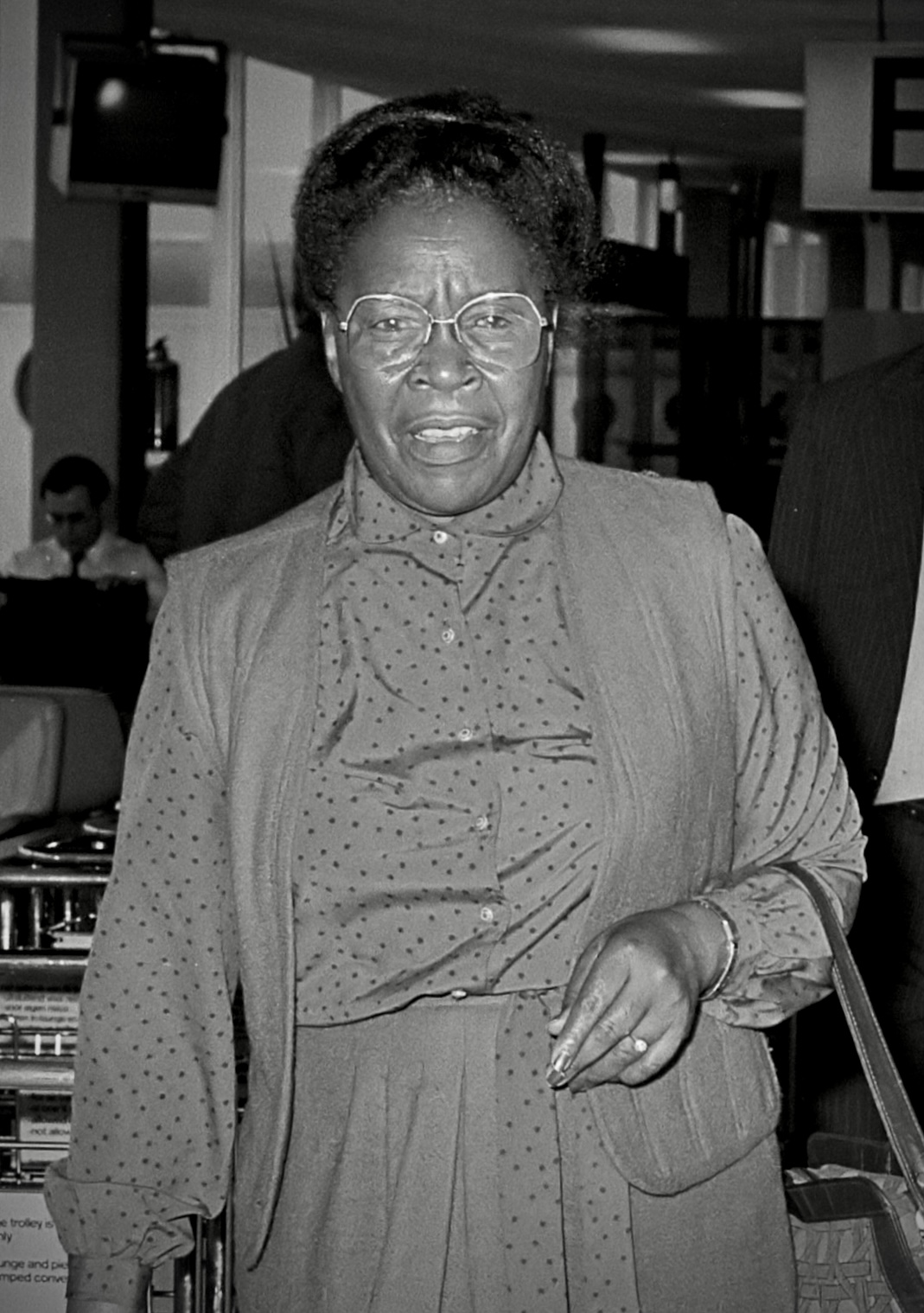
- Gaositwe Chiepe in 1985

Minister of Trade and Industry
- In office 1977 – 14 September 1984

Foreign Minister
- In office 14 September 1984 – 25 October 1994

Minister of Education
- In office 25 October 1994 – 20 October 1999

Personal details
- Born: 20 October 1922 Bechuanaland
- Died: 26 January 2025 (aged 102) Botswana
- Party: Botswana Democratic Party
- Education: Tiger Kloof Educational Institute, South Africa, Fort Hare University

Gaositwe Keagakwa Tibe Chiepe (20 October 1922 – 26 January 2025) was a Motswana politician and diplomat with the Botswana Democratic Party. She was her country's high commissioner to the United Kingdom and Nigeria and ambassador to West Germany, France, Denmark, Norway, Sweden, and the European Economic Community. She was Botswana's Minister for Trade and Industry in 1977, and in 1984, she became the Foreign Minister. She served as the Minister for Education from 1994 to 1999.

== Early life ==
Chiepe was born in what was the Bechuanaland Protectorate (now Botswana) on 20 October 1922, to Moruti Tibe Chiepe and S. T. Chiepe (née Sebina). Her father died in her youth and her extended family wanted her to leave school and get married, Her mother insisted that she stay on at school to continue her education. Chiepe later attributed her successful career to her mother's insistence that she be educated.

== Education ==
Chiepe attended primary school in Serowe and eventually went to Tiger Kloof Educational Institute, South Africa, for secondary education, having received a scholarship as the best student in the country.

She attended Fort Hare University, also in South Africa, where she received a Bachelor of Science degree as well as a postgraduate diploma in education.

In 1958, she graduated from the University of Bristol in the United Kingdom with a master's degree. Her doctoral thesis was entitled "An Investigation of the Problems of Popular Education in the Bechuanaland Protectorate in Light of a Comparative Study of Similar Problems in the Early Stages of English Education and in the Development of Education in Yugoslavia and Uganda.

She was awarded an honorary degree from Depaul University, United States. Chiepe began her career in the Bechuanaland Protectorate Government in the Department of Education and was one of the first two Africans appointed to an administrative position (Education Officer) in the colonial government. Chiepe was the first woman education officer in Botswana.

== Political career ==
Chiepe was the first female cabinet member in Botswana (1974) having become a Specially-Elected Member of Parliament. She was popularly elected to parliament from the Serowe South constituency in the Central District of Botswana in a by-election in 1977.

She was appointed to the post of high commissioner to the United Kingdom and Nigeria and ambassador to West Germany, France, Denmark, Norway, Sweden, and the European Economic Community from 1970 to 1974. During her time as High Commissioner in the United Kingdom, she chaired the fifth Caroline Haslett Memorial Lecture at the Royal Society of Arts. Run by the Women's Engineering Society, Letitia Obeng, then Director of Freshwater Research Institute of Aquatic Biology in Ghana spoke on 'Nation Building & the African Woman'.

From 1974 to 1977, Chiepe was the Minister of Trade and Industry. From 1977 to 1984, she was the Minister of Mines & Natural Resources. In 1982 Chiepe served as Honorary President of the Kalahari Conservation Society (KCS).

In 1984, Chiepe became the Foreign Minister (Minister of External Affairs), in which position she remained until 1994.

From 1994 to 1999, she was the Minister of Education. Chiepe retired from government life in 1999 after nearly 30 years of high-level positions.

In 2013, she was the headline speaker at Botswana's International Day of Older Persons held in the Mokolodi Nature Reserve, saying "We want to be 'the aged in counsel and the young in action ... Let us, as the elderly not be relegated to being dinosaurs but utilize our knowledge and hard earned wisdom to not only increase our relevance and longevity in society, but also increase the contact between generations, bridging the gap between young and old."

== Later life and death ==
In October 2022, Chiepe turned 100. In response, the Cabinet of Botswana convened a meeting to honour Chiepe for her lifetime of service to the country.

Chiepe died in her residence on 26 January 2025, at the age of 102.

== Recognition ==
Chiepe was awarded both the Presidential Order of Merit and the Presidential Order of Meritorious Service (Botswana), and appointed a Commander of the Royal Order of the Polar Star by the King of Sweden. In the 1960 Birthday Honours, she was appointed a Member of the Order of the British Empire (MBE).

She received honorary doctorates from University of Bristol in Britain, De Paul University in the United States and Fort Hare in South Africa. In 2009 she was awarded an honorary Doctorate of Laws by the University of Botswana for her outstanding work in the development of the country.

== Publications ==
- Thesis (Ph.D.) University of Bristol, 1957. An Investigation of the Problems of Popular Education in the Bechuanaland Protectorate: In the Light of a Comparative Study of Similar Problems in the Early Stages of English Education and in the Development of Education in Yugoslavia and Uganda.
- Chiepe, G. K. T. (1973). "Development in Botswana". African Affairs. 72. 319–322. doi:10.1093/oxfordjournals.afraf.a096390.
- Rensburg, Patrick & Chiepe, G. (April 1996). "The Botswana Brigades, 1965–1995". Education with Production 11(2): 81–90.

== See also ==
- List of the first women holders of political offices in Africa

== Sources ==
- Biography on Book Rags

Political offices
Preceded by Archibald Mogwe	Foreign Minister of Botswana; 1985–1994	Succeeded by Mompati Merafhe
