= 1965 Bechuanaland general election =

- 1 March 1965

31 of the 35 seats in the National Assembly 16 seats needed for a majority
- Registered: 188,950
- Turnout: 74.55% (of registered voters); 69.46% (of eligible population) (Note: National Study On Voter Apathy in Botswana (PDF). University of Botswana. IEC Botswana. 2022. p. 17.)
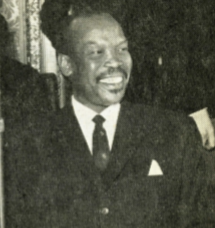

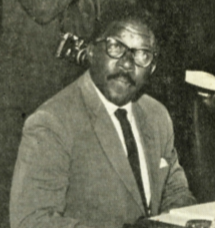
	Majority party	Minority party
Leader	Seretse Khama	Philip Matante
Party	BDP	BPP
Leader's seat	Serowe North	Francistown/Tati East
Seats won	28	3
Popular vote	113,167	19,964
Percentage	80.38%	14.18%
- Results by constituency
Elected Prime Minister
Seretse Khama
BDP

General elections were held in the Bechuanaland Protectorate on 1 March 1965, marking the country's first election under universal suffrage. The result was a landslide victory for the Bechuanaland Democratic Party (BDP), with Seretse Khama becoming Prime Minister. Following the elections, the country became independent as Botswana on 30 September 1966, at which point Khama became President. The BDP went on to win the next twelve elections, maintaining its grip on power until its defeat in the 2024 general election 59 years later.

== Campaign ==
The elections were contested by three main parties; the Bechuanaland Democratic Party led by Khama, the Bechuanaland People's Party (BPP) led by Philip Matante and the Bechuanaland Independence Party led by Motsamai Mpho. There was also a single independent candidate, G.E.N. Mannathoko, who ran in Tati West. In the Lobatsi and Barolong constituency, there were two candidates from the Bechuanaland People's Party, one of whom represented the Motsete branch.

Despite general acceptance that the BDP was likely to win easily, there was widespread interest in the elections. The BDP was seen as a moderate party with responsible leaders and realistic policies; in contrast the leaders of the other parties were perceived as quarrelsome and overly ethnocentric. Three BDP candidates were elected unopposed in Ghanzi, Kgalagadi and Kweneng West.

== Results ==
Party	Votes	%	Seats
Bechuanaland Democratic Party	113,167	80.38	28
Bechuanaland People's Party	19,964	14.18	3
Bechuanaland Independence Party	6,491	4.61	0
Bechuanaland People's Party (Motsete Branch)	377	0.27	0
Independents	789	0.56	0
Indirectly-elected members			4
Total	140,788	100.00	35
Registered voters/turnout	188,950	–	
Source: Nohlen et al.
