= Philip Matante =

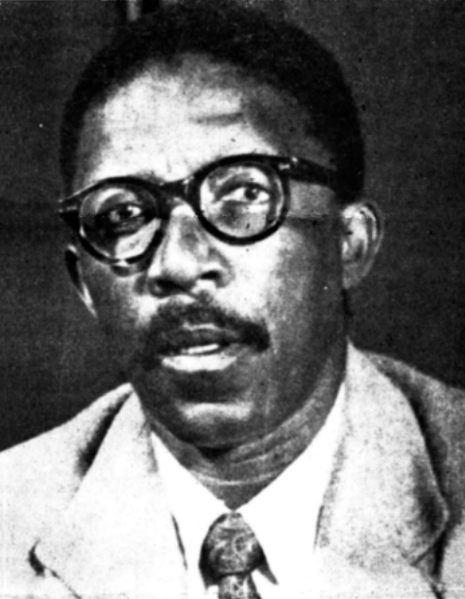
- Born: Philip Parcel Goanwe Matante; 25 December 1912; Serowe, Botswana
- Died: 25 October 1979 (aged 66); Francistown, Botswana
- Known for: Founder of Botswana People's Party

Philip Parcel Goanwe Matante (25 December 1912 – 25 October 1979) was a Motswana nationalist and founder of the Botswana People's Party. He was the opposition leader in the National Assembly of Botswana from its establishment in 1965 until his death in 1979.

== Biography ==
Philip Parcel Goanwe Matante was born in 1921. He said that his father was Goanwe Matante of Serowe. He served with the African Auxiliary Pioneer Corps in World War II, in which he was one of the few people in the British army outside of nobility to hold the rank of sergeant. Matante moved to Francistown in 1957, where he was a store manager and a minister. He co-founded the Tatitown Cultural Organisation in 1959.

Along with K. T. Motsete and Motsamai Mpho, Matante co-founded the Bechuanaland People's Party, later the Botswana People's Party (BPP). With the party, he railed against the British protectorate over the region, describing it as racist and attributing the people's problems to its structure. Matante pointed to the arrests of political opposition as evidence that Botswana had become a police state, even when the opposition threatened to engage in political violence. He also argued that the United Kingdom was unable to protect Botswana from foreign threats. For these reasons, by 1962 he was demanding independence no later than the beginning of 1963. When this did not occur, he concluded that "the Protectorate will not be able to attain independence by any save revolutionary means", and he allegedly built a small guerrilla force to carry this out.

While Matante was initially the party's vice president, he gained stronger influence over the BPP. A feud began between Matante and Mpho in 1962. Matante was affiliated with the Pan Africanist Congress, and he was suspicious of the African National Congress of which Mpho was a member. Mpho was likewise suspicious of Matante after he was found to be embezzling from incoming foreign aid. Mpho was driven out of the party. Motsete then left soon afterward, leaving Matante as the BPP's sole leader in 1964.

When Botswana was granted self-governance, Matante was elected to the National Assembly to represent the Francistown/Tati East constituency. As one of three members of his party in the Assembly during the 1st Parliament of Botswana, he became the opposition leader. Once elected to parliament, Matante and the BPP reversed their position on full independence, arguing that the process should take place gradually so as not to cause civil unrest. Matante was the first member of parliament to propose a national military. He held his position in parliament until the 1979 general election, when he lost his seat to BDP. He died five days after the election.

== Legacy ==
Matante is associated with his use of West African imagery, such as robes from the region and the symbol of a Ghanaian black star. Phillip Gaonwe Matante International Airport was named in Philip Matante's honor. The late Botswana People’s Party (BPP) founder, Mr Philip Matante has been bestowed the Naledi ya Botswana award by the President Dr Mokgweetsi Masisi at the Botswana Honours Awards ceremony.
