= Motsamai Mpho =

Motswana activist and politician (1921–2012)

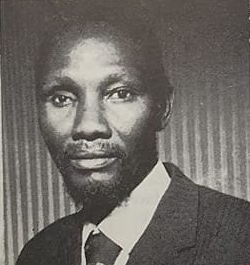
- Born: 3 February 1921; Botswana
- Died: 28 November 2012 (aged 91)
- Political party: Botswana Independence Party
- Spouse: Onalepelo Hannah Macheng

Motsamai Keyecwe Mpho (February 3, 1921 – November 28, 2012) was a Motswana activist and politician. He founded Botswana's first political party in 1960, the Botswana People's Party, then known as the Bechualand People's Party, alongside Klaas Motshidisi, Kgalemang Motsete, and Philip Matante. However, due to conflict within the party, Mpho left and founded the Botswana Independence Party in 1964. He also served as a member of the National Assembly. Some historians believe that Mpho was the first to introduce the term 'Botswana' into formal political vocabulary, replacing the colonialist name of Bechuanaland.

He married his wife, Onalepelo Hannah Macheng, on 7 July 1960, whilst incarcerated in Pretoria Prison for treason in South Africa.

Mpho was among the first to sing the Botswana national anthem after returning to Botswana following a Pan-African conference in Ghana in 1972.

Mpho died at Princes Marina Hospital in Botswana on November 28, 2012.

== Awards ==
- Presidential Award for Meritorious Service (Government of Botswana)
- Order of the Companions of O. R. Tambo (Government of South Africa, 26 April 2005)
