= 1979 Botswana general election =

- 20 October 1979

32 of the 36 seats in the National Assembly 17 seats needed for a majority
- Registered: 243,483
- Turnout: 55.24% (of registered voters) (▲24.02pp); 46.37% (of eligible population) (▲20.16pp) (Note: National Study On Voter Apathy in Botswana (PDF). University of Botswana. IEC Botswana. 2022. p. 17.)
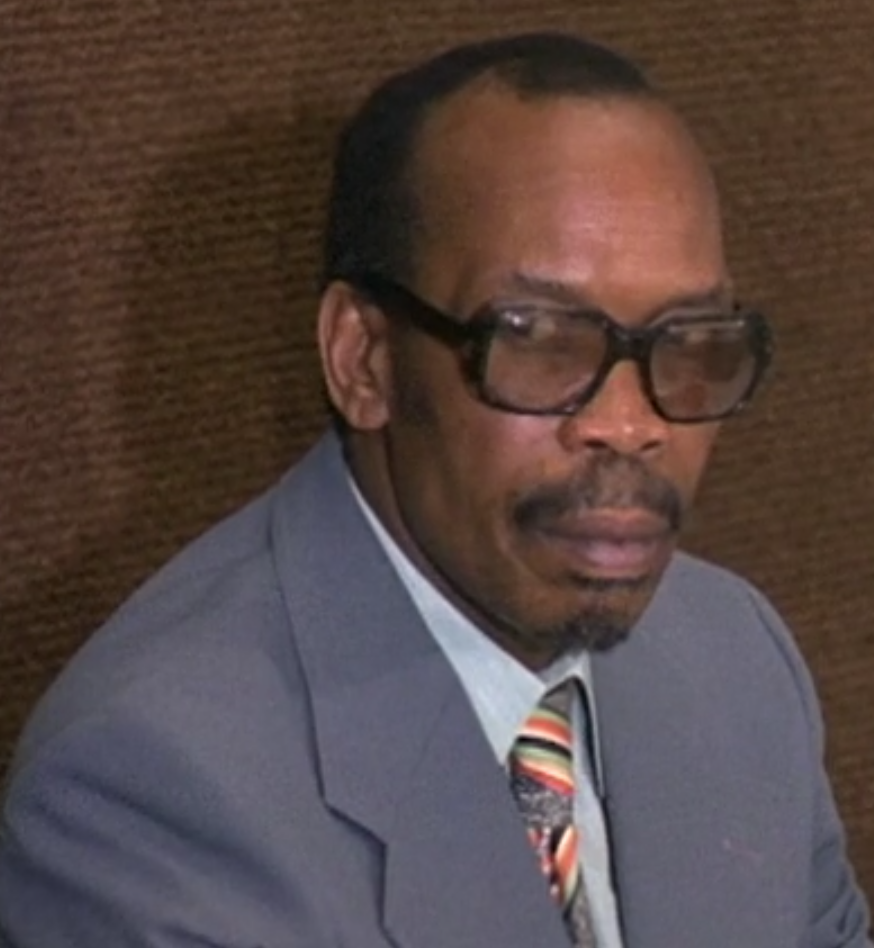

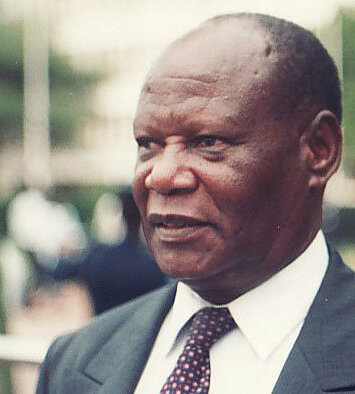

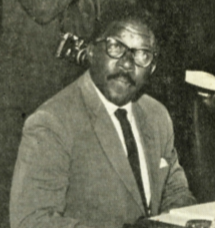
	Majority party	Minority party	Third party
Leader	Seretse Khama	Kenneth Koma	Philip Matante
Party	BDP	BNF	BPP
Leader's seat	None (Note: Incumbent presidents are ineligible to contest National Assembly seats; instead, they serve as ex-officio members of Parliament.)	Gaborone (defeated)	Francistown (defeated)
Last election	76.62%, 27 seats	11.49%, 2 seats	6.56%, 2 seats
Seats won	29	2	1
Seat change	▲2	Steady	▼1
Popular vote	101,098	17,480	9,983
Percentage	75.17%	13.00%	7.42%
Swing	▼1.45pp	▲1.51pp	▲0.86pp
- Results by constituency
President before election
Seretse Khama
BDP
Elected President
Seretse Khama
BDP

General elections were held in Botswana on 20 October 1979. The result was a fourth successive landslide victory for the Botswana Democratic Party (BDP), which won 29 of the 32 elected seats, including two in which its candidates ran unopposed.

As of the 2019 general elections, this is the last election where the BDP received more than 70% of the popular vote.

== Campaign ==
A total of 69 candidates contested the election. The BDP was the only party to run a full slate of 32 candidates, with the Botswana National Front putting forward 16 candidates, the Botswana People's Party 14 and the Botswana Independence Party five. There were also two independents. The BDP campaigned on opposition to apartheid in South Africa and a call for economic sanctions against Zimbabwe-Rhodesia.

Prior to the elections, the voter roll was completely revamped, accompanied by a vigorous radio and press campaign by the government to encourage registration. Although the number of registered voters increased by only 6,635 compared to the 1974 elections, this was deemed to be due to the 1974 voter roll having numerous duplications.

== Results ==
Party	Votes	%	Seats	+/–
Botswana Democratic Party	101,098	75.17	29	+2
Botswana National Front	17,480	13.00	2	0
Botswana People's Party	9,983	7.42	1	–1
Botswana Independence Party	5,657	4.21	0	–1
Independents	278	0.21	0	0
Indirectly-elected members			4	–
Total	134,496	100.00	36	0
Registered voters/turnout	230,231	–		
Source: EISA, Nohlen et al.
