= 1974 Botswana general election =

- 26 October 1974

32 of the 36 seats in the National Assembly 17 seats needed for a majority
- Registered: 205,050
- Turnout: 31.22% (of registered voters) (▼23.51pp); 26.21% (of eligible population) (▼11.25pp) (Note: National Study On Voter Apathy in Botswana (PDF). University of Botswana. IEC Botswana. 2022. p. 17.)
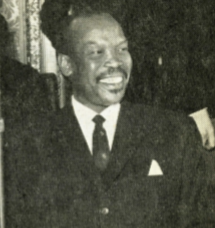

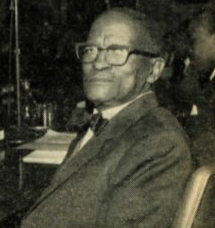

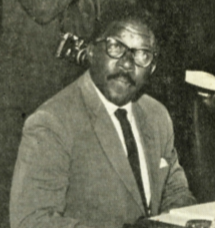

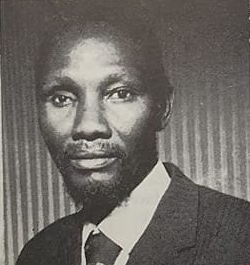
	Majority party	Minority party
Leader	Seretse Khama	Bathoen Gaseitsiwe
Party	BDP	BNF
Leader's seat	None (Note: Incumbent presidents are ineligible to contest National Assembly seats; instead, they serve as ex-officio members of Parliament.)	Kanye South
Last election	68.33%, 24 seats	13.54%, 3 seats
Seats won	27	2
Seat change	▲3	▼1
Popular vote	49,047	7,358
Percentage	76.62%	11.49%
Swing	▲8.29pp	▼2.05pp
	Third party	Fourth party
Leader	Philip Matante	Motsamai Mpho
Party	BPP	BIP
Leader's seat	Francistown	Okavango
Last election	12.14%, 3 seats	5.99%, 1 seats
Seats won	2	1
Seat change	▼1	Steady
Popular vote	4,199	3,086
Percentage	6.56%	4.82%
Swing	▼5.58pp	▼1.17pp
- Results by constituency
President before election
Seretse Khama
BDP
Elected President
Seretse Khama
BDP

General elections were held in Botswana on 26 October 1974. With 205,050 registered voters, turnout was just 31.22%. The result was a third successive landslide victory for the Botswana Democratic Party (BDP), which won 27 of the 32 elected seats, including four in which its candidates ran unopposed. Local elections were held on the same day, with a turnout of just 30.3%, and saw the BDP strengthen its position.

== Campaign ==
A total of 63 candidates contested the elections. The BDP ran a full slate of 32 candidates, the Botswana National Front fielded 14 candidates, the Botswana People's Party had eight, the Botswana Independence Party had six, and there were three independents.

== Results ==
Party	Votes	%	Seats	+/–
Botswana Democratic Party	49,047	76.62	27	+3
Botswana National Front	7,358	11.49	2	–1
Botswana People's Party	4,199	6.56	2	–1
Botswana Independence Party	3,086	4.82	1	0
Independents	321	0.50	0	New
Indirectly-elected members			4	0
Total	64,011	100.00	36	+1
Registered voters/turnout	205,050	–		
Source: EISA, Nohlen et al.
