= Botswana Independence Party =

Political party located in Botswana

The Botswana Independence Party (BIP) was a political party in Botswana that existed from 1962 to 1994.

The BIP was founded in 1962 by former members of the Botswana People's Party (BPP) and was led by Motsamai Mpho.

During its existence, the BIP played the role of a minor opposition party. The party participated in five national elections (1969, 1974, 1979, 1984, and 1989), but managed to gain representation in the National Assembly only twice (1969 and 1974), both times winning only one seat.

In 1994, the BIP merged with the Botswana Freedom Party (BFP) to form the Independence Freedom Party (IFP) under the leadership of Motsamai Mpho. The IFP won only 3% of the vote and no seats in elections held on 15 October 1994. Soon after, the IFP ceased to exist.

The party advocated for pan-africanism, social democracy, centrism and later for liberalism and neoliberalism.

== Electoral results ==
Year	Leader	Votes	%	Seats	Seat change	Rank	Status
1965	Motsamai Mpho	6,491	4.61%	0 / 35	0	▲3rd	Extra-parliamentary
1969	Motsamai Mpho	4,601	6.01%	1 / 35	▲1	▼4th	Opposition
1974	Motsamai Mpho	3,086	4.82%	1 / 36	0	4th	Opposition
1979	Motsamai Mpho	5,657	4.21%	0 / 36	▼1	4th	Extra-parliamentary
1984	Motsamai Mpho	7,288	3.20%	0 / 38	0	4th	Extra-parliamentary
1989	Motsamai Mpho	6,209	2.48%	0 / 38	0	4th	Extra-parliamentary
