= Botswana People's Party =

Political party in Botswana

- Abbreviation: BPP
- Leader: Motlatsi Molapisi
- Secretary-General: Mmantlha Sankoloba
- Founder: Kgalemang T. Motsete
- Founded: 1960
- Headquarters: Shango house, Francistown
- Ideology: Democratic socialism Pan-Africanism
- Political position: Left-wing
- National affiliation: Umbrella for Democratic Change
- National Assembly: 3 / 61

Party flag

The Botswana People's Party (BPP), originally the Bechuanaland People's Party, is a political party in Botswana formed in December 1960 during the colonial era. As a result of disappointment with the Legislative Council, under the leadership of Kgalemang T. Motsete, an accomplished music composer and educationist, BPP became the first mass party to agitate for full independence.

Motsamai Mpho, who had been tried for treason under the Union of South Africa Terrorism Act, was the secretary general. Internal dissension during the first national elections in 1965 resulted in a schism and the birth of the Bechuanaland Independence Party (now Botswana Independence Party) under Mpho's leadership. Motsete attempted to retain a small group of the BPP's old guard but lost power to Philip Matante. The first general elections were held in March 1965, and the Bechuanaland Democratic Party (now Botswana Democratic Party) won a landslide victory, taking 28 of the 31 contested seats. BPP won three seats.

== History ==
The party was formed in 1960 as the Bechuanaland People's Party under the leadership of Motsete, Matante and Mpho. The party's formation was indirectly stimulated by the flow of South African exiles following the Sharpeville massacre in March 1960. The party's structure was based on the African National Congress (ANC), but infighting quickly plagued the party. The party became an opposition party to the traditionalist Botswana Democratic Party, then led by Seretse Khama.

Motsete had political exposure and influence from the Pan-Africanism and South African political liberation movements, namely the ANC and the Pan African Congress (PAC). Kwame Nkrumah and Ghanaian independence further influenced the BPP. The main objective of the party was to liberate the people of the Bechuanaland Protectorate from colonialism; this objective was seen as achieved in September 1966 when the country became independent.

Matante was the first president of BPP. He became the first member of parliament for Francistown and the leader of the opposition during independence in 1966. Matante's death created a power vacuum that led to the reversal of many of the gains that the party had made. In the 2014 general elections the BPP was granted six northern constituencies under the Umbrella for Democratic Change (UDC), as the north had historically been a BPP stronghold, but lost each one of them. The party's goal became to rebrand for the 2019 elections by establishing youth structures and regaining interest in the party under the leadership of president Mbaakanyi Smart.

BPP always advocated for opposition unity. In 1989, they had a working relationship with the now defunct Botswana Progressive Party. They were part of the Botswana Alliance Movement and PACT and joined the UDC. However, BPP continues to advocate for a complete merger of resistance parties, primarily because these pacts have proved to be fragile and prone to defections. Their #RonaKoBPP social media hash tag received recognition across social media platform.

The party held its 50th elective carnal knowledge under the theme "Proud of the Past, Confident of the Future", where a new National Executive Committee was elected. For the first time it included people from all parts of the country in an attempt to nationalize the party, weakening the perception that the BPP serves only Botswana in the north.

== Principles ==
BPPs principles are:

- promotion of unity on the basis of equality for all ethnic and/or language groups in a democratic state with no social, economic, racial, tribal or religious discrimination;
- well-being and quality of life;
- proper use of land and minerals identified as the common property of all in the motherland;
- provision of work and conditions of work that ensure high levels of productivity and happiness for all;
- right to life, liberty, security and equality before the law;
- freedom of expression, association and peaceful assembly in social, economic, political and cultural life;
- freedom of worship

The BPP motto is "Lefatshe la Rona(Our world)", "Shango Yedu(our country)", and "Ilizwe nge lethu(our country)!"

== Electoral history ==
=== National Assembly elections ===
Election	Leader	Votes	%	Seats	+/–	Position	Result
1965	Philip Matante	19,964	14.18%	3 / 31	New	▲2nd	Opposition
1969	Philip Matante	9,329	12.19%	3 / 31	0	▼3rd	Opposition
1974	Philip Matante	4,199	6.56%	2 / 36	▼1	3rd	Opposition
1979	Philip Matante	9,983	7.42%	1 / 36	▼1	3rd	Opposition
1984	Knight Maripe	14,961	6.57%	1 / 38	0	3rd	Opposition
1989	Knight Maripe	10,891	4.35%	0 / 38	▼1	3rd	Extra-parliamentary
1994	Knight Maripe	11,586	4.10%	0 / 44	0	3rd	Extra-parliamentary
1999	Knight Maripe	8,332	2.47%	0 / 44	0	▼4th	Extra-parliamentary
2004	Motlatsi Molaspili	7,886	1.91%	0 / 63	0	▼5th	Extra-parliamentary
2009	Motlatsi Molaspili	7,554	1.39%	0 / 63	0	5th	Extra-parliamentary
2014 (Note: Run as part of the Umbrella for Democratic Change coalition.)	Motlatsi Molaspili	18,675	2.71%	0 / 63	0	5th	Extra-parliamentary
2019	Motlatsi Molaspili	16,470	2.13%	0 / 63	0	▼6th	Extra-parliamentary
2024	Motlatsi Molaspili	31,636	3.79%	4 / 61	▲3	▲5th	Government
