= Seretse Khama =

First President of Botswana (1921–1980)

His Excellency Sir Seretse Khama GCB KBE
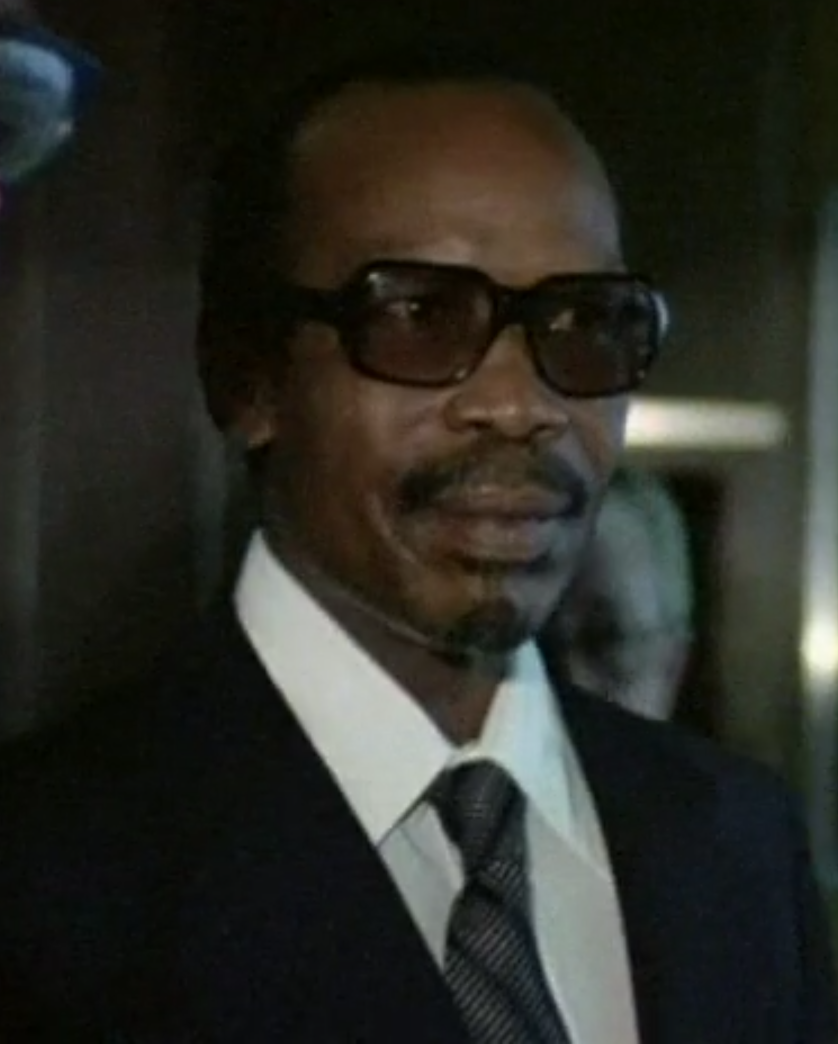
- Khama in 1977

1st President of Botswana
- In office 30 September 1966 – 13 July 1980
- Vice President: Quett Masire
- Preceded by: Himself as Prime Minister
- Succeeded by: Quett Masire

Prime Minister of Bechuanaland
- In office 3 March 1965 – 30 September 1966
- Monarch: Elizabeth II
- Preceded by: Position established
- Succeeded by: Himself as President

Personal details
- Born: Seretse Goitsebeng Maphiri Khama; 1 July 1921 Serowe, Bechuanaland Protectorate
- Died: 13 July 1980 (aged 59) Gaborone, Botswana
- Resting place: Royal Cemetery, Serowe, Botswana
- Party: Botswana Democratic Party
- Spouse: Ruth Williams (m. 1948)
- Children: Jacqueline Khama; Ian Khama; Tshekedi Khama II; Anthony Khama
- Education: University of Fort Hare; Balliol College, Oxford
- Profession: Barrister

Sir Seretse Goitsebeng Maphiri Khama, GCB, KBE (1 July 1921 – 13 July 1980) was a Motswana politician who served as the first President of Botswana, a post he held from 1966 to his death in 1980.

Born into an influential royal family of what was then the British protectorate of Bechuanaland, he was educated abroad in the neighbouring country of South Africa and then in the United Kingdom. While in Britain, he married an Englishwoman named Ruth Williams, a decision opposed by the white-minority government of South Africa and which led to a controversy resulting in the British government making him stay in England in exile so as to not sour U.K.–South African relations.

After the end of his exile, Khama led his country's independence movement and the transition from British rule into an independent nation. He founded the Botswana Democratic Party in 1962 and became Prime Minister in 1965. In 1966, Botswana gained independence and Khama was elected as its first president. During his presidency, the country underwent rapid economic and social progress. Khama served as President until his death in 1980, and was succeeded in office by Quett Masire. His son, Ian Khama, served as Botswana's fourth president from 2008 to 2018.

== Childhood and education ==
Seretse Khama was born in 1921 in Serowe, in what was then the Bechuanaland Protectorate. He was the son of Queen Tebogo and Sekgoma Khama II, the paramount chief of the Bamangwato clan of the Tswana, and the grandson of Khama III, their king. The name Seretse means "the clay that binds". He was named this to celebrate the recent reconciliation of his father and grandfather; this reconciliation assured Seretse's own ascension to the throne with his aged father's death in 1925. At the age of 4, Seretse became kgosi (king), with his uncle Tshekedi Khama as his regent and guardian.

After being educated at the Tiger Kloof Educational Institute in South Africa, Khama attended Fort Hare University College there, graduating with a general B.A. in 1944. He travelled to the United Kingdom and studied at Balliol College, Oxford from 1944 to 1946. Due to a lack of proficiency in Latin, he left Oxford and was admitted to the Inner Temple in London in 1946, where he continued his legal studies to become a barrister.

== Marriage and exile ==
In June 1947, Khama met Ruth Williams, an English clerk at Lloyd's of London. After a year of courtship, they married in September 1948. The interracial marriage sparked a furore, alarming both the Union of South Africa, which had established legal apartheid (racial segregation), and the tribal elders of the Bamangwato, who were angered he had not chosen one of their women.

On being informed of the marriage, Khama's uncle Tshekedi Khama demanded his return to Bechuanaland and the annulment of the marriage. Khama did return to Serowe. After a series of kgotlas (public meetings), he was reaffirmed by the elders in his role as the kgosi in 1949. Ruth Williams Khama, travelling with her new husband, proved similarly popular. Admitting defeat, Tshekedi Khama left the Bamangwato reserve for voluntary exile in the Bakwena reserve while Khama returned to London to complete his studies.

=== Impact on UK–South African relations ===
However, the international ramifications of his marriage were not so easily resolved. Having banned interracial marriage in 1949 under the apartheid system, South Africa's government opposed having an interracial couple ruling just across their northern border. The couple was banned from entering South Africa, including Mafeking, which then operated as the administrative capital of Bechuanaland. Since Bechuanaland was then a British protectorate (not a colony), the South African government immediately tried to exert pressure on the UK to have Khama removed from his chieftainship.

The Attlee ministry, Britain's Labour-led government, then heavily in debt from World War II, could not afford to lose cheap South African gold and uranium supplies. They also feared that South Africa might take more direct action against Bechuanaland, either economic sanctions or a military incursion. London based Black civil rights leader Billy Strachan, who served as the Joint Secretary of the Seretse Khama Fighting Committee, wrote a letter defending Khama which was then published in the Manchester Guardian. On 8 March 1950 the Labour Secretary for Commonwealth Relations, Patrick Gordon-Walker, announced in the House of Commons that Khama would not be able to revisit the Bechuanaland Protectorate for at least 5 years, even though his wife was pregnant and in Bechuanaland. Three weeks later, on 28 March, Fenner Brockway, a British Labour MP, forced a debate in the House of Commons on the decision to banish Seretse Khama from his homeland, while withholding recognition of him as the Chief of the Bamangwato people, because he had married Ruth Williams.

The British government conducted a judicial enquiry into Khama's fitness for the chieftainship. The investigation did not disapprove of interracial marriage as such and reported that he was eminently fit to rule the Bamangwato, "but for his unfortunate marriage", which prevented good relations with neighbouring apartheid regimes. The government ordered that the report be suppressed (it would remain so for thirty years) and exiled Khama and his wife from Bechuanaland in 1951.

== Return to politics ==
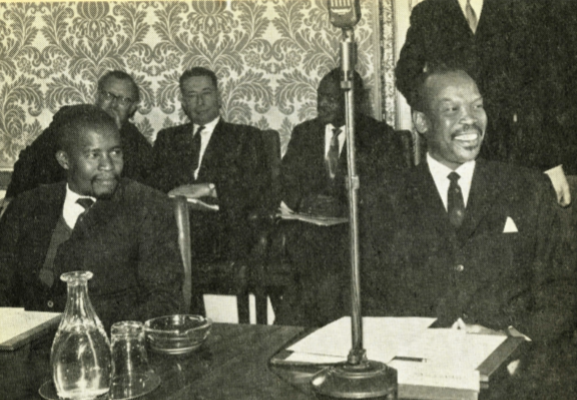
Khama (seated, front right) with his future vice president and successor Quett Masire during Botswana's independence talks in 1965

The British government's decision concerning Khama immediately proved controversial, both in Britain and Bechuanaland. Several British newspapers made calls for the resignation of Lord Salisbury, the minister responsible for the decision. A deputation of six Bamangwato travelled to London to see the exiled Khama and Lord Salisbury, in an echo of the 1895 deputation of three Batswana kgosis to Queen Victoria, but met with no success. However, when ordered by the British High Commission to find a suitable candidate to replace Khama, the Bamangwato rebuffed the order.

In 1956, both Khama and his wife were allowed to return to Bechuanaland as private citizens, after he had renounced the tribal throne. Khama began an unsuccessful stint as a cattle rancher. He became involved in local politics, being elected to the tribal council in 1957 as its secretary. In the 1961 Birthday Honours, he was recognised for his services as tribal secretary by his appointment as an Officer of the Order of the British Empire (OBE).

In 1961, Khama returned to politics by founding the Bechuanaland Democratic Party. His exile gave him an increased credibility with an independence-minded electorate, and the BDP swept aside its Socialist and Pan-Africanist rivals to dominate the 1965 elections. As Prime Minister of Bechuanaland, Khama continued to push for Botswana's independence while based in the newly established capital of Gaborone. A 1965 constitution delineated a new Botswana government, and on 30 September 1966, Botswana gained its independence. As prescribed by the new constitution, Khama became its first President. Ten days prior to this, Elizabeth II had promoted Khama within the Order of the British Empire, appointing him a Knight Commander (KBE).

== Presidency ==
At the time of its independence in 1966, Botswana was the world's third-poorest country, poorer than most other African countries. Its infrastructure was minimal, with only 12 kilometres (7.5 miles) of paved roads; and few of its people had formal education, with only 22 university graduates and 100 secondary school graduates.

Khama set out on a vigorous economic programme intended to transform the nation into an export-based economy, built around beef, copper and diamonds. The 1967 discovery of Orapa's diamond deposits aided this programme.

Khama instituted strong measures against corruption. His administration adopted free-market-friendly policies to foster economic development. Khama promised low and stable taxes to mining companies, liberalized trade, and increased personal freedoms. He maintained low marginal income tax rates to deter tax evasion and corruption. He upheld liberal democracy and non-racism in the midst of a region embroiled in civil war, racial enmity and corruption.

The small public service was transformed into an efficient and relatively corruption-free bureaucracy with workers hired based on merit. Calls to immediately "indigenize" the bureaucracy were resisted, and the government retained foreign expatriates working in the bureaucracy until suitably qualified locals could be found to replace them. Khama and his people also drew on international advisers and consultants. Mining companies were encouraged to search the country for more resources, leading to the discovery of additional copper, nickel, and coal deposits.

Between 1960 and 1980 Botswana had the fastest-growing economy in the world. This growth was primarily driven by mining, and the government acted to gain a greater percentage of its revenue. The customs union between Botswana and South Africa was renegotiated in 1969, with the government of Botswana securing for itself a greater share of the mining revenue. In 1975, after it had become clear how productive these mines were, the government again renegotiated the diamond mining agreement to guarantee itself 50% of the revenues. By the mid-1970s, Botswana had a budget surplus.

The government used these revenues to heavily invest in the expansion of infrastructure, health care, and the education system, resulting in further economic development. In particular, the government invested in other sources of economic growth. The cattle industry was heavily subsidised, with the government nationalising the country's lone slaughterhouse and building two more, heavily subsidising veterinary services, vaccines, and cattle fence construction. It set up the Botswana Meat Commission as the sole seller of beef in the country, setting prices and selling beef to regional and international markets. With Khama's direct intervention, it negotiated a lucrative trade deal with the European Economic Community, gaining prices far above world levels. Khama also spearheaded a national fundraising campaign to build Botswana's first institute of higher education, which resulted in the establishment of the University of Botswana in 1982, after Khama's death.

The Botswana Development Corporation was established in 1970 to attract foreign investment in crop agriculture, tourism, and the secondary sector. In 1976, the Botswana pula was introduced, replacing the South African rand as the national currency.

Due to Khama's dedication to development, very little was spent on defence, and a small military police force was initially formed in place of an army. However, following repeated incursions by South African and Rhodesian forces, the Botswana Defence Force was formed in 1977 as a small professional military. On the foreign policy front, Khama was careful politically and did not allow militant groups to operate from within Botswana. According to Richard Dale,

The Khama government had authority to do so by virtue of the 1963 Prevention of Violence Abroad act, and a week after independence, Sir Seretse Khama announced before the National Assembly his government's policy to insure that Botswana would not become a base of operations for attacking any neighbour.

Shortly before his death, Khama played major roles in negotiating the end of the Rhodesian civil war and the resulting creation and independence of Zimbabwe, and the creation of the Southern African Development Co-ordination Conference.

Khama was reelected three times by virtue of the BDP easily winning the 1969, 1974 and 1979 elections. In Botswana, candidates for the National Assembly declare whom they endorse for president when they lodge their nomination papers, and the presidential candidate with a majority of endorsements is automatically elected. He governed with very large majorities for his entire tenure, never facing more than seven opposition MPs.

== Death ==
For a number of years leading up to his death, Khama's health deteriorated. He suffered from heart and kidney ailments. In 1960 he had been diagnosed with diabetes. In 1976, he underwent a heart operation in Johannesburg to install a pacemaker. From then on, he frequently flew to London for medical treatment. In June 1980, while receiving treatment in London, Khama was diagnosed with terminal pancreatic cancer. He returned home after it was determined that no cure was possible.

Khama died in his sleep on 13 July 1980 in the presence of his wife in Botswana. Following his death, Khama was succeeded by Vice President Quett Masire. Forty thousand people paid their respects to Khama as his body lay in state in Gaborone. He was buried in the Royal Cemetery on a hill in Serowe, Central District.

== Legacy ==
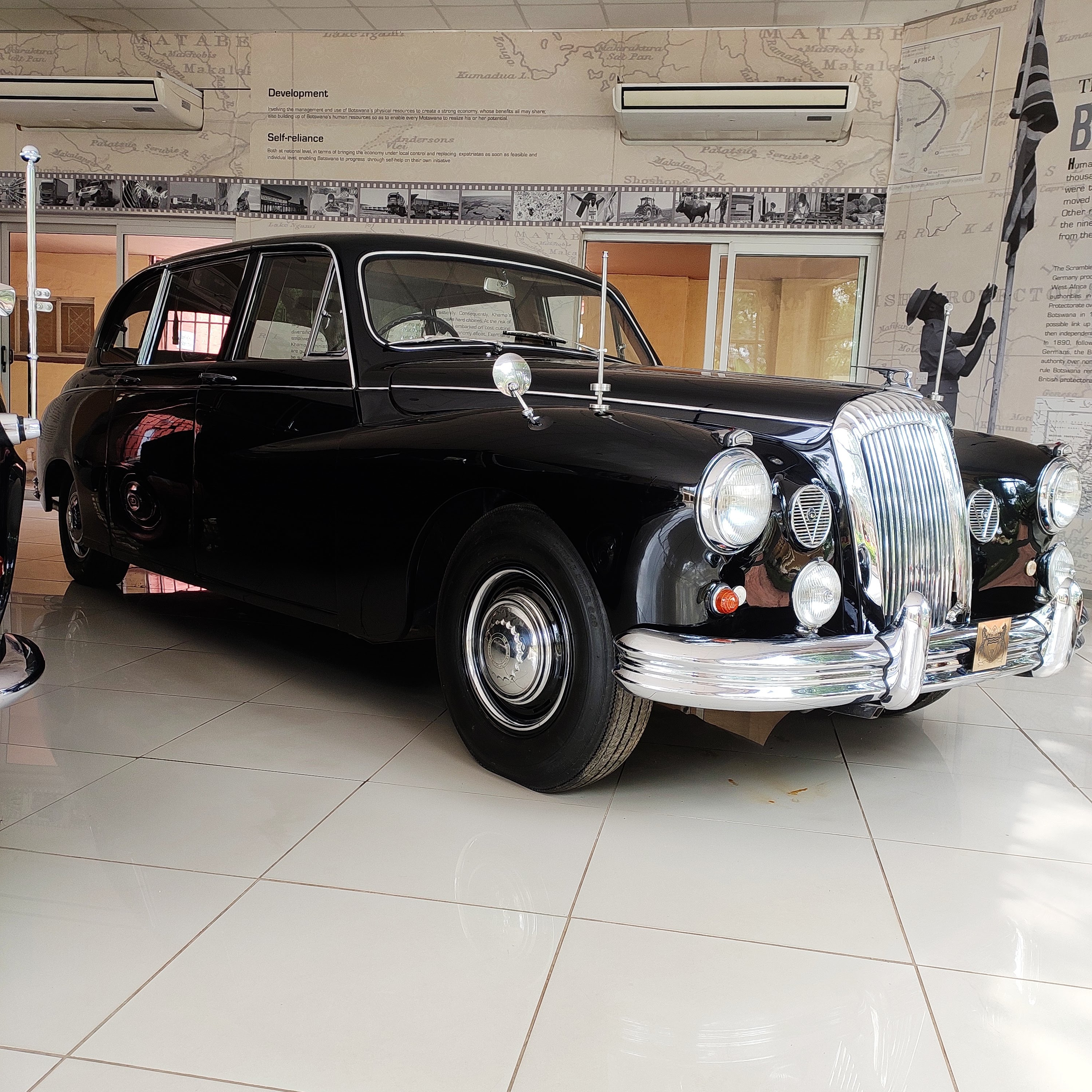
The first Daimler limousine used by President Seretse Khama

Sir Seretse Khama International Airport near Gaborone, Botswana

Twenty-eight years after Khama's death, his son Ian succeeded Festus Mogae as the fourth president of Botswana; in the 2009 general election he won a landslide victory. That year, his younger son, Tshekedi Khama II, was elected as a parliamentarian from Serowe North West. Ian Khama left office in 2018. Since 2024, Duma Boko (born on 31 December 1969) has been the president of Botswana.

Sir Seretse Khama International Airport, Botswana's main airport, was named after Khama and opened in 1984.

The 2016 film A United Kingdom, directed by Amma Asante and written by Guy Hibbert, told the story of the controversies that surrounded Khama's marriage. It starred David Oyelowo as Khama and Rosamund Pike as Ruth Williams. Furthermore, it has also been suggested that Sir Seretse's relationship with Lady Khama influenced the writers of the Oscar-winning film Guess Who's Coming to Dinner, which starred Spencer Tracy, Katharine Hepburn and Sidney Poitier.

Khama is frequently referenced in The No. 1 Ladies' Detective Agency books by Alexander McCall Smith. Mma Ramotswe, the series' protagonist, greatly admires him, compares him with Nelson Mandela and very much regrets the fact of his not being so well known internationally.

== Works cited ==
- Akyeampong, Emmanuel Kwaku; Gates, Henry Louis, eds. (2012). Dictionary of African Biography. Vol. 3. New York: Oxford University Press USA. ISBN 978-0-19-538207-5.

Political offices
Preceded by New office	Prime Minister of Botswana; 1965–1966	Succeeded by Himself as President
Preceded by Himself as Prime Minister	President of Botswana; 1966–1980	Succeeded by Quett Masire
