= Bobirwa (Botswana constituency) =

Parliamentary constituency in Botswana, 1965 onwards

- Single-member constituency for the National Assembly
- District: Central District
- Population: 47,103
- Major settlements: Bobonong
- Area: 8,593 km^{2}

Current constituency
- Created: 1965
- Party: BCP
- MP: Taolo Lucas
- Margin of victory: 2,343 (12.2 pp)

Bobirwa is a constituency in Botswana represented in the National Assembly of Botswana by Taolo Lucas, a Botswana Congress Party (BCP) MP since 2019.

== Constituency profile ==
The seat was a stronghold for the Botswana Democratic Party (BDP), consistently supporting it with large majorities from its establishment in 1965 until the 2019 general election where perennial candidate Taolo Lucas flipped it to the opposition column, ending the BDP's 54-year grip on the constituency. The constituency was subject to modest boundary changes and was renamed to Bobonong in the run-up to the 2014 general election. This win aligned with the broader success the Umbrella for Democratic Change (UDC) achieved in the northern part of Botswana during the 2019 election. Posterior to the exit of the BCP from the UDC, Taolo Lucas held the seat with a twelve-point margin of victory, his best performance yet.

The predominantly rural constituency encompasses the following localities:

1. Bobonong
2. Gobojango
3. Mabolwe
4. Semolale
5. Moletemane
6. Tsetsebjwe
7. Mathathane
8. Molalatau
9. Lentswelemoriti
10. Motlhabaneng
11. Lepokole

== Members of Parliament ==
Key: BDP UDC BCP

Election	Winner
1965 election	Archelaus Tsoebebe
1969 election	Abel Sikunyane
1974 election	Abel Sikunyane
1979 election	Walter Mosweu
1984 election	Walter Mosweu
1989 election	James Maruatona
1994 election	James Maruatona
1999 election	James Maruatona
2004 election	Shaw Kgathi
2009 election	Shaw Kgathi
2014 election	Shaw Kgathi
2019 election	Taolo Lucas
2024 election	Taolo Lucas

== Election results ==
=== 2024 election ===
General election 2024: Bobirwa
Party	Candidate	Votes	%	±%
BCP	Taolo Lucas	10,074	52.57	+3.11
BDP	Francisco Kgoboko	7,731	40.34	−4.41
UDC	Tshepang Makwati	703	3.67	N/A
BPF	Boitshepelo Jakoba	656	3.42	N/A
Margin of victory		2,343	12.23	+7.52
Total valid votes		19,164	99.28	−0.12
Rejected ballots		139	0.72	+0.12
Turnout		19,303	82.91	−1.61
Registered electors		23,282		
BCP hold		Swing	+3.76	

=== 2019 election ===
General election 2019: Bobonong
Party	Candidate	Votes	%	±%
UDC	Taolo Lucas	8,956	49.46	−0.68
BDP	Francisco Kgoboko	8,103	44.75	−5.11
Independent	Jan Moshokwa	762	4.21	N/A
BMD	Ofentse Dukes	287	1.58	N/A
Margin of victory		853	4.71	N/A
Total valid votes		18,108	99.40	+0.41
Rejected ballots		109	0.60	−0.41
Turnout		18,217	84.52	+0.56
Registered electors		21,554		
UDC gain from BDP		Swing	+2.22	

=== 2014 election ===
General election 2014: Bobonong
Party	Candidate	Votes	%	±%
BDP	Shaw Kgathi	7,350	49.86	−3.97
BCP	Taolo Lucas	7,230	49.04	+2.87
UDC	Kgaugelo Machete	162	1.10	N/A
Margin of victory		120	0.82	−6.84
Total valid votes		14,742	98.99	+1.06
Rejected ballots		151	1.01	−1.06
Turnout		14,893	83.96	+7.27
Registered electors		17,738		
BDP hold		Swing	−3.42	

=== 2009 election ===
General election 2009: Bobirwa
Party	Candidate	Votes	%	±%
BDP	Shaw Kgathi	5,899	53.83	+0.70
BCP	Taolo Lucas	5,059	46.17	−0.70
Margin of victory		840	7.66	+1.40
Total valid votes		10,958	97.93	+0.81
Rejected ballots		232	2.07	−0.81
Turnout		11,190	76.69	−0.05
Registered electors		14,592		
BDP hold		Swing	+0.70	

=== 2004 election ===
General election 2004: Bobirwa
Party	Candidate	Votes	%	±%
BDP	Shaw Kgathi	4,258	53.13	−26.67
BCP	Taolo Lucas	3,756	46.87	+26.67
Margin of victory		502	6.26	−53.34
Total valid votes		8,014	97.12	+3.15
Rejected ballots		238	2.88	−3.15
Turnout		8,252	76.74	−4.88
Registered electors		10,753		
BDP hold		Swing	−26.67	

=== 1999 election ===
General election 1999: Bobirwa
Party	Candidate	Votes	%	±%
BDP	James Maruatona	4,913	79.80	−2.37
BCP	Taolo Lucas	1,244	20.20	N/A
Margin of victory		3,669	59.60	−4.74
Total valid votes		6,157	93.97	N/A
Rejected ballots		395	6.03	N/A
Turnout		6,552	75.52	+5.01
Registered electors		9,035		
BDP hold		Swing	−2.37	

=== 1994 election ===
General election 1994: Bobirwa
Party	Candidate	Votes	%	±%
BDP	James Maruatona	4,714	82.17	−5.11
BNF	L.S. Letubo	1,023	17.83	+5.11
Margin of victory		3,691	64.34	−10.22
Turnout		5,737	70.51	+3.03
Registered electors		8,137		
BDP hold		Swing	−5.11	

=== 1989 election ===
General election 1989: Bobirwa
Party	Candidate	Votes	%	±%
BDP	James Maruatona	4,853	87.28	−5.72
BNF	Balebeng Marumo	707	12.72	+5.72
Margin of victory		4,146	74.56	−11.44
Turnout		5,560	67.48	−6.96
Registered electors		8,240		
BDP hold		Swing	−5.72	

=== 1984 election ===
General election 1984: Bobirwa
Party	Candidate	Votes	%	±%
BDP	Walter Mosweu	5,542	93.00	−3.98
BNF	Nicolas Selelo	417	7.00	N/A
Margin of victory		5,125	86.00	−7.96
Turnout		5,959	74.44	+19.54
Registered electors		8,005		
BDP hold		Swing	−3.98	

=== 1979 election ===
General election 1979: Bobirwa
Party	Candidate	Votes	%
BDP	Walter Mosweu	4,269	96.98
BPP	G.F. Manowe	133	3.02
Margin of victory		4,136	93.96
Turnout		4,402	54.90
Registered electors		8,018	
BDP hold			

=== 1974 election ===
General election 1974: Bobirwa
Party	Candidate	Votes	%	±%
BDP	Abel Sikunyane	Walkover	N/A	N/A
BDP hold				

=== 1969 election ===
General election 1969: Bobirwa
Party	Candidate	Votes	%	±%
BDP	Abel Sikunyane	3,243	95.52	−2.60
BNF	M.E. Malema	152	4.48	N/A
Margin of victory		3,091	91.04	−5.95
Turnout		3,395	60.22	N/A
Registered electors		5,637		
BDP hold		Swing	−2.60	

=== 1965 election ===
General election 1965: Bobirwa
Party	Candidate	Votes	%
BDP	Archelaus Tsoebebe	5,382	98.12
BPP	J. Sechele	62	1.13
BIP	B. Nwako	41	0.75
Margin of victory		5,320	96.99
Turnout		5,485	N/A
Registered electors		N/A	
BDP win (new seat)			
