= Thune Dam =

- Location within Botswana
- Country: Botswana
- Location: Central District
- Coordinates: 22.18071°S 28.70232°E
- Opening date: 2013

Dam and spillways
- Height: 33.6 metres (110 ft)
- Length: 1.7 kilometres (1.1 mi)

Reservoir
- Total capacity: 90,000,000 cubic metres (3.2×10^{9} cu ft)

The Thune Dam is a dam on the Thune River in Botswana that was under construction in 2012 and opened in 2013. It has a planned capacity of 90,000,000 cubic metres (3.2×10^{9} cu ft).

== Description ==
The dam is located on the Thune river upstream from its confluence with the Motloutse. The dam is situated in relatively flat country, and will have an average depth of about 15 metres (49 ft). Given the hot, dry climate, evaporation loss is a serious concern. Various ways to reduce such loss have been considered but rejected. The dam will be an earthfill clay-core structure. It will be 33.6 metres (110 ft) high, with a 1.7 kilometres (1.1 mi) long wall and a 90,000,000 cubic metres (3.2×10^{9} cu ft) capacity.

== Purpose ==
The dam will supply drinking water to several villages in the Bobirwa area, and irrigation water to an agricultural project near Mathathane. Once complete, water will be delivered to the villages of Bobonong, Motlhabaneng, Mathathane, Tsetsebjwe, Mabolwe, Semolale, Gobojango, Lepokole and Molalatau.

== Construction ==
A stakeholders workshop was held in September 2009 at Molalatau Secondary School Hall, where the Minister provided information and answered questions. He warned that, although the dam would bring large benefits, there would also be problems during the construction process such as an influx of illegal immigrants, crime and sexual problems such as HIV/AIDS and teen pregnancies.

The dam site was handed over to the contractor, Zhon Gan Engineering and Construction, on 30 April 2010. The project was due to be completed in April 2013. The water treatment plant and pipelines could be delayed until 2014 due to funding problems. In July 2010 it was reported that work on the dam site had halted since an incident in which a worker was killed a month earlier. Bush clearing had started in the site so surveying could be undertaken, but the project was behind schedule. A ground-breaking ceremony was held in September 2010, attended by Ponatshego Kedikilwe, Minister of Minerals, Energy and Water Resources.

As of March 2011, Thune Dam was just 38% complete. Delays had been caused by floods, and there were problems with construction of accommodations and with licenses.
