= Mabolwe =

Village in Botswana

Coordinates: 21°49′23″S 28°50′17″E

Location of Mabolwe

Mabolwe is a village in the Central District of Botswana that is located in the eastern tip of the country's border with Zimbabwe. As of 2019, the village has a single primary school, and 30 out of the 3,000 residents are employed. More current data is available from Statistics Botswana.

== Mabolwe border post ==
In 2008, the government of Botswana approved a border post in Mabolwe Mmamabaka, which links both Botswana and Zimbabwe. The border post was opened in 2016.

== History ==
The primary inhabitants of Mabolwe are the Bobirwa people who were nomadic before permanently settling in their present settlements. Bobirwa is the area that lies between the Shashe River and a north–south line approximately 28 0 15 ' E. The area encompasses the villages of Bobonong, Gobojango, Mabolwe, Lentswe-Ie-Moriti, Mathathane, Molaladau, Mothabaneng, and Tsetsebjwe.

The Bobirwa people originated in Nareng, which lies in the south of Bolobedi in Letswalo country around Phalaborwa. The Bobirwa peoples' presence in Nareng dates back to between 1510 and 1599. Bobirwa moved from Nareng under their chief, Tshukudu, to the Bloubergstrand area in former Transvaal. It was while they were at Blaauwberg that they began to split up around the 1820s. The group which left Bloubergstrand headed for Zimbabwe under Dauyatswala and his brother Makhure. This group was not welcomed in Mambo's country.

The two brothers decided to leave to seek refuge somewhere else. At the last moment, Makhure refused to go with Dauyatswala. Dauyatswala together with his followers, moved back to Transvaal. Makhure was given a piece of land in Zimbabwe to live with his followers. They lived for a while before they were attacked by the Ndebele of Mzilikazi, running away from Shaka's rule in 1837. They fled to present-day Botswana led by Sekoba, one of Makhure's sons. Sekoba was accompanied by his brothers Makala, Mbalane, and Bolamba, who, in most traditions, are mentioned alongside Sekoba as the group leader. Among the group were also Sekoba's uncles, Serumola, Legong, Mphago, and Maunatlala. It is not clear from the sources whether these men were real brothers or half brothers of Makhure. This group broke up with Sekoba and his followers settling at Lephokwe, while Bolamba's group settled in the Tuli Block.

That is where Bobirwa began spreading over the area today called Bobirwa, including the Tuli Block. The Bobirwa did not live under the authority of Sekoba for long. They broke from Sekoba and lived in isolated settlements. Only those loyal to Sekoba remained with him. Sekoba's group went to settle at Majweng Hills. Bolamba and his followers settled at Zembefonyi near the present-day Lentswe-le-Moriti. Maunatlala settled his people in Lepoko1e Hills in the northern part of Bobonong. Serumola moved his people and settled at Lephale Hills in the Tuli Block, and Makala settled East of Mapungubwe. The people of Kgwatalala and Mbalane settled on the hill called Lekhubu-la-Mbalane in the present-day Semolale. In their settlements, Bobirwa were attacked by the Ndebele forces. In the 1860s, Khama sent his newly formed age regiment of Mafolosa and Matshosa to Bobirwa. These age-regiments were to group Bobirwa in one place. Because of the attacks and resentment of Khama's rule, Bobirwa migrated to the Transvaal and joined the other Bobirwa people there. They stayed in Transvaal until 1894, when the Boers attacked them, after which the Bobirwa returned to their settlements in Botswana. Sekoba's group, led by his son Madikwe, settled at Majweng Hills in the present-day northeastern Bobonong.

In the 1890s, Malema became the leader of the people of Bolamba who settled in the Tuli Block in Zembefonyi; next to it was Mmadema at Pitseng near Ghadi Pan, and within the same region Serumola and his followers settled at Lephale Hill. Today, they are still ruled by Serumola's grandson, Richard Serumola. Before occupying Mathathane, these people were among the Malema people forced to leave the Tuli Block by Khama III in 1920. In 1906, Khama III sent his son-in-law Modisaotsile Mokomane as a chief representative to gather the Bobirwa people and place them in one village. Modisaotsile established the present Bobonong in 1909 and was joined by other groups loyal to Khama III.

In 1919, Khama sent Modisaotsile to remove Malema's people from the Tuli Block to make way for the British South Africa Company's white settlers. Khama ceded the area of Tuli Block in 1895 to the British government, who had passed it to the BSA Company. Malema refused to leave the place, reasoning that he had already plowed, and Modisaotsile responded with force. His regiments burnt the fields of Malema's people. At some point, Malema was summoned to Serowe in chains, and Bobirwa cattle were also confiscated. Malema was sentenced to death and everyone was ordered to kill him with a spear if he was spotted.

Malema filed a case in a court of law demanding his ancestral land back and claiming $40,000 in damages. He was represented by a Mafikeng-based lawyer named Glucksman, whom Malema promised 1,000 heads of cattle as payment if he won. Khama III died before the issue was settled, but his son Sekgoma II was installed as a kgosi, who admitted that his father acted harshly. In the end, British interests managed to dismiss the case. In protest, Malema fled with his people to Transvaal before returning to settle at Molaladau in 1944.

== Culture ==
Mabolwe people, like other Bobirwa, speak Sebirwa, a language from the Bantu family with around 10,000 speakers in Botswana and South Africa.
