= Three Dikgosi Monument =

Monument in Gaborone, Botswana

- The monument as seen in 2019
- Interactive map of Three Dikgosi Monument
- Coordinates: 24°38′42″S 25°54′26″E
- Builder: Mansudae Overseas Projects
- Type: Statue
- Material: Bronze
- Height: Each statue is 5.4 m (18 ft), the entire monument is 7 m (23 ft)
- Opening date: 29 September 2005
- Inauguration date: 29 September 2005
- Dedicated to: Khama III, Sebele I, and Bathoen I

The Three Dikgosi Monument is a bronze sculpture located in the Central Business District of Gaborone, Botswana's capital city. The 7-metre (23 ft) tall monument features 5.4-metre (18 ft) tall statues of Khama III, Sebele I, and Bathoen I—three dikgosi (tribal chiefs) recognised as foundational figures in the nation's history. In 1895, the three travelled to Great Britain accompanied by Christian missionaries and convinced the British government to not merge the Bechuanaland Protectorate and Cecil Rhodes's British South Africa Company following threats to merge the two entities. Permission was granted, giving Botswana British protection until its independence in 1966.

The three were eventually declared "Founders of the Nation" by the government-owned Kutlwano Magazine at the time of Botswana's independence. In 1990, the House of Chiefs proposed that the three dikgosi be commemorated through a public monument. The North Korean company Mansudae Overseas Projects was commissioned to complete the project, which resulted in controversy among local sculptors. It was inaugurated on 29 September 2005 by former President Festus Mogae.

The monument features a coat of arms in front of the three statues. Six plinths at the feet of the statues provide information about Botswana's independence and struggles from the Mfecane period to Botswana's independence. The monument has been criticised for retaining Tswana dominance and for not including Sechele I, a crucial figure in the Batswana victory of the Battle of Dimawe.

== Background ==
Botswana is a landlocked country in southern Africa, bordered by South Africa to the south and south-east, Namibia to the west and north, and Zimbabwe to the north-east. The region's dominant ethnic group, the Tswana people, organised themselves into a type of tribal government called a morafe (plural merafe), each led by a chief called a kgosi (plural dikgosi).

Fearing increased German influence in the region, the UK established the Bechuanaland Protectorate in 1885. For several Tswana dikgosi, British protection was preferable to the prospect of incorporation into neighbouring territories controlled by settler colonialism from Germany or the British South Africa Company. They also wished to avoid falling under the control of South Africa or the mining magnate Cecil Rhodes, though the protectorate still found itself dependent on South Africa economically.

In the years after the protectorate's creation, the UK entered talks with Rhodes to absorb it into the British South Africa Company. During the 1890s, the British government considered transferring control of the Bechuanaland Protectorate to the British South Africa Company, which threatened to place Tswana polities under the authority of Rhodes's company. In response, three influential dikgosi, Khama III of the Ngwato tribe, Sebele I of the Kwena tribe, and Bathoen I of the Ngwaketse tribe made a diplomatic trip to the UK in 1895, accompanied by Christian missionaries Edwin Lloyd and Reverends William Charles Willoughby, and convinced the government not to complete the deal. Their mission became an important episode in the history of the territory that later became Botswana and contributed to their subsequent commemoration as important figures in the country's national history. Following the failed Jameson Raid in December 1895, which was organised by Rhodes's associates against the South African Republic, British negotiations concerning the transfer of the protectorate were postponed indefinitely.

== History and planning ==
The three dikgosi were dubbed "Founders of the Nation" by the government-owned Kutlwano Magazine at the time of Botswana's independence in 1966. Over the following decades, they were adopted as "icons of unitary nationalism advocating renewed independence". In 1990, the House of Chiefs proposed that the three dikgosi be commemorated in a public monument. Funds were allocated for a statue in the 1997–98 budget and an advisory committee was appointed to determine the statue's location, but construction was delayed due to objections regarding the location of the monument by planning officials.

A site in the capital city Gaborone's Main Mall was nominated by the advisory committee in 2001, but eventually rejected in favour of a site in the new Central Business District, north-west of the Main Mall, where it was eventually built. Further funds were allotted in 2003 and a request for tender was published, with four proposals received. An unsuccessful proposal put forward by local sculptor Masilonyana Radinoga showed "the three kings gesticulating and consulting among themselves".

In an attempt to secure more allies after the Korean War, North Korea was in support of most African nationalist movements post-Second World War. The first President of Botswana, Sir Seretse Khama, accompanied by Festus Mogae, visited Pyongyang in 1976. The bid of the North Korean Mansudae Overseas Projects, an international subdivision of a Pyongyang art institute, was accepted for the construction of the monument. The group was given a contract of P7 million (US$1.5 million), which eventually became P10 million (US$2 million), for the sculpture. The final project cost roughly P10.5 million (US$2.1 million). Local sculptors expressed their disappointment about the project being given to Mansudae, especially since many of them were willing to do more for less money. The monument was inaugurated on 29 September 2005 by Festus Mogae, former President of Botswana. The day the monument was opened, 800 visitors came.

In 2015, parts of the statues began showing unusual peeling and degradation, possibly due to the use of substandard materials. To avoid ongoing state maintenance costs, in 2022 the government launched a public–private partnership initiative to hand the site's future maintenance over to the private sector. Under this proposal, private developers are expected to finance, build, and maintain an exhibition gallery, a restaurant, an interpretation centre, and other services on the remaining 50 per cent of the vacant land.

== Description and appearance ==
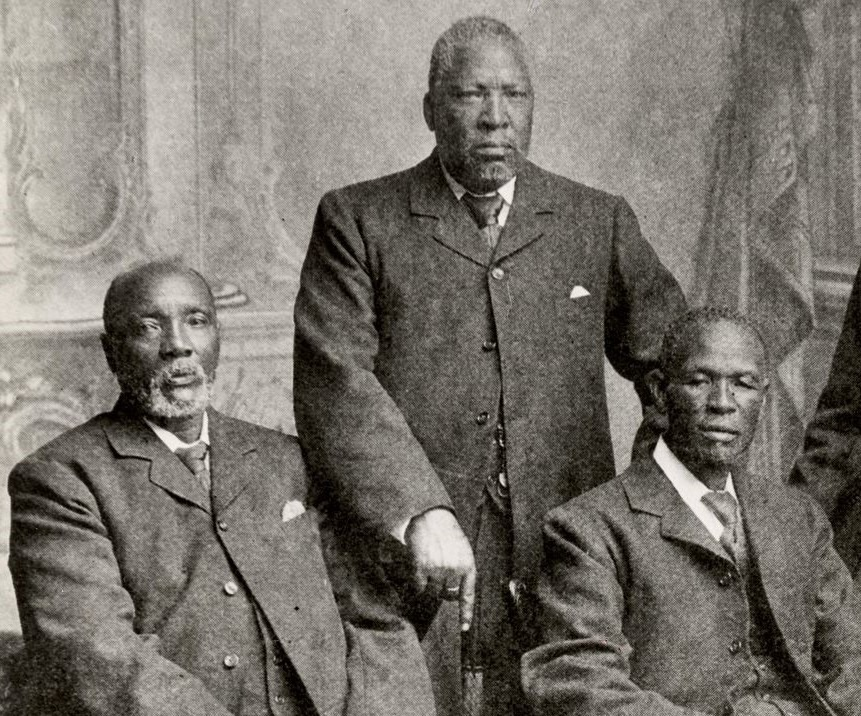
From left to right: Sebele I, Bathoen I and Khama III; the three dikgosi featured on the monument.

The monument features 5.4-metre (18 ft) tall bronze statues of three dikgosi: Khama III, Sebele I, and Bathoen I. The entire monument is 7 metres (23 ft) high. Botswana's coat of arms, a symbol which belongs exclusively to matters of great importance for the country such as the national currency, is displayed in front of the three statues.

Six inscribed plinths are located by the feet of the statues, each of which describes a different period in the history of Botswana from the early 19th century up until its independence. The plinths describe a history starting in the Mfecane period, with Batswana kingdoms expanding from an influx of refugees from wars in southern Africa. The subsequent plinths go on to describe a period from the 1830s to 1880s in which the dikgosi resisted invasion from the Ndebele and Boer people, the dikgosi's request to Queen Victoria for protection of the Bechuanaland Protectorate from the British South Africa Company in 1895, the period of extreme poverty suffered by the Protectorate in the first three decades of the 20th century, Botswana's fighting alongside the Allied Powers in the Second World War, and Botswana's independence from Britain, declared in 1966.

The six plinths read:

- Botshabelo: (Note: Setswana for 'refuge') (1820s–1830s) Batswana kingdoms expanded out of Difaqane wars by attracting refugees.
- Bogaka: (Note: Setswana for 'heroism') (1830s–1880s) Dikgosi bravely resisted the Ndebele and Boers [sic] invaders.
- Tshireletso: (Note: Setswana for 'protection') (1880s–1890s) From the beginning Batswana had Different [sic] ideas about the Protectorate.
- Boitshoko: (Note: Setswana for 'endurance') (1900s–1930s) Bechuanaland was poor, times were tough, but communities built schools and dams.
- Maikarabelo: (Note: Setswana for 'global responsibility') (1930s–1940s) Batswana fought alongside allied forces for freedom and against racism.
- Boipuso: (Note: Setswana for 'independence') (1950s–1960s) Political independence from Britain was achieved in 1966. The process of nation building commenced.

== Political significance and criticisms ==
Despite the monument's existence, Phillip Segadika from the Botswana National Museum states that there is no specific independence monument. Some minority ethnic groups in Botswana saw the monument and its construction as a proclamation of Tswana dominance. Batsani Ndaba, a Kalanga person and chair of the Society for Promotion of Ikalanga Language, stated that the journey of the three dikgosi was only of significance to their own tribes and there was "nothing for minorities to celebrate about the three chiefs going to England". Heritage researcher Keletso Setlhabi argues that the memorial reinforces hegemonic masculinity and traditional Tswana patriarchy by visually equating nation-building and state power exclusively with male leadership.

Mmegi writer Thalefang Charles labelled the monument as "disappointing and shameful" in 2020 since it does not feature Sechele I, a kgosi who led the Batswana to victory during the Battle of Dimawe. He also noted how the British government weaponised the request to defend their annexation in 1885, quoting historians Jeff Ramsay and Barry Morton: “The idea that Britain established the Bechuanaland Protectorate in 1885 at the request of the Tswana chiefs for ‘protection’ originated from British government officials as a cover story for their annexation”.

== See also ==
- History of Gaborone
- Botswana art

== Bibliography ==
- Bogaka [Heroism]. Three Dikgosi Monument. Gaborone, Botswana: Mansudae Overseas Projects. 2005. "Bogaka Heroism (1830's-1880's) Dikgosi bravely resisted the Ndebele and Boers invaders."
- Boipuso [Independence]. Three Dikgosi Monument. Gaborone, Botswana: Mansudae Overseas Projects. 2005. "Boipuso Independence (1950's-1960's) Political independence from Britain was achieved in 1966. The process of nation building commenced."
- Boitshoko [Endurance]. Three Dikgosi Monument. Gaborone, Botswana: Mansudae Overseas Projects. 2005. "Boitshoko Endurance (1900's-1930's) Bechuanaland was poor, times were tough, but communities built schools and dams."
- Botshabelo [Refuge]. Three Dikgosi Monument. Gaborone, Botswana: Mansudae Overseas Projects. 2005. "Botshabelo Refuge (1820's-1830's) Batswana kingdoms expanded out of Difaqane wars by attracting refugees."
- Breuker, Remco; van Gardingen, Imke (2018). "North Korean Forced Labour on a Global Scale". People for Profit. Contributors: Blinka, Jan. Blom, Britt. Boonen, Marte. Boonstra, Klara. Brandse, Rosa. van den Herik, Larissa. van der Hoog, Tycho. Meurs, Marieke. Ryngaert, Cedric. Stewart, Shannon. van der Veere, Anoma. Leiden, Netherlands. ISBN 978-90-826167-1-2. OCLC 1051240896.
- Charles, Thalefang (8 October 2021). "#BOT55 in search of the Independence Monument". Mmegi. Archived from the original on 27 October 2021.
- Charles, Thalefang (25 September 2020). "Three Dikgosi Monument is a Historical Disgrace". Mmegi. Archived from the original on 7 December 2025.
- Charles, Thalefang (6 March 2015). "Three Dikgosi Monument shows true "fake" colours". Mmegi. Archived from the original on 6 October 2022.
- Denbow, James R.; Thebe, Phenyo C. (2006). Culture and Customs of Botswana. Greenwood Press. ISBN 978-0-313-33178-7. OCLC 230730729.
- Gaotlhobogwe, Monkagedi (3 October 2005). "Botswana: 'Dikgosi' Monument Becomes Instant Attraction". Mmegi. Archived from the original on 3 July 2024 – via allAfrica.
- Gulbrandsen, Ørnulf (March 2012). "Chapter 1: The Development of Tswana Merafe and the Arrival of Christianity and Colonialism". The State and the Social: State Formation in Botswana and Its Pre-Colonial and Colonial Genealogies. New York City: Berghahn Books. p. 29. ISBN 9780857452979. LCCN 2011037469 – via Google Books.
- Hillbom, Ellen; Bolt, Jutta (2018). Botswana – A Modern Economic History. Palgrave Macmillan. doi:10.1007/978-3-319-73144-5. ISBN 978-3-319-73144-5. OCLC 1028747438.
- Hjort, Jonas (2009). "Pre-Colonial Culture, Post-Colonial Economic Success? The Tswana and the African Economic Miracle". The Economic History Review. 63 (3): 688–709. doi:10.1111/j.1468-0289.2009.00495.x. OCLC 9989218562. PMID 20617585.
- Koma, Baboucarr; Ntumwa, Caroline; Abdullahi, Mohammed; Makwebo, Patricia; Mariga, Erick; Kahubire, Edith; Nhavoto, Salmina Marta Merique; Naipanoi, Lydiah; Labintan, Adeniyi Constant; Coulibaly, Abdoulaye; Mokadem, Leila; Mbekeani, Kennedy K.; Gebre-Selassie, Kalayu (2022). Project: Public Private Partnership Capacity Strengthening Project (PPP-CSP) (PDF) (Report). African Development Bank. Archived (PDF) from the original on 29 August 2023.
- Leith, James Clark (2005). Why Botswana Prospered. McGill–Queen's University Press. ISBN 978-0-7735-2821-5. OCLC 191934628.
- Letsididi, Bashi (30 March 2014). "North Korea built Three Dikgosi Monument". The Sunday Standard. Archived from the original on 4 August 2026.
- Maikarabelo [Global responsibility]. Three Dikgosi Monument. Gaborone, Botswana: Mansudae Overseas Projects. 2005. "Maikarabelo Global responsibility (1930's-1940's) Batswana fought alongside allied forces for freedom and against racism."
- McCullough, Branden C. (2023). "Jameson Raid". EBSCO Information Services. Archived from the original on 28 August 2026.
- Parsons, Neil (3 February 1998). King Khama, Emperor Joe, and the Great White Queen: Victorian Britain through African Eyes. University of Chicago Press. ISBN 978-0-226-64744-9.
- Parsons, Neil (2006). "Unravelling History and Cultural Heritage in Botswana". Journal of Southern African Studies. 32 (4): 679. doi:10.1080/03057070600995350. ISSN 0305-7070. OCLC 9971130786.
- "Population census atlas 2011: Botswana" (PDF). Statistics Botswana. 2015. Archived from the original on 28 August 2026.
- Rotberg, Robert Irwin (2023). "Botswana: Africa's Democratic Exception". Overcoming the Oppressors: White and Black in Southern Africa. Oxford University Press. pp. 192–231. ISBN 9780197674239. OCLC 1348102603.
- Segwai, Keto (28 July 2006). "Botswana: Three Dikgosi in Waiting". Mmegi. Archived from the original on 3 July 2018 – via allAfrica.
- Seretse, Gasebalwe (17 October 2008). "Monuments worth visiting". Mmegi. Archived from the original on 20 November 2011.
- Setlhabi, Keletso G. (2018). "Taller than the rest: The Three Dikgosi Monument, masculinity reloaded". In Grahn, Wera; Wilson, Ross J. (eds.). Gender and Heritage Performance, Place and Politics (1st ed.). Routledge. pp. 113–125. ISBN 9781138208148. OCLC 957386970.
- Thebe, Phenyo Churchill; Manatsha, Boga Thura (26 July 2023). "Archaeology in Botswana's history". History Compass. 21 (10). Wiley-Blackwell. doi:10.1111/hic3.12785. eISSN 1478-0542. ISSN 1478-0542.
- Tshireletso [Protection]. Three Dikgosi Monument. Gaborone, Botswana: Mansudae Overseas Projects. 2005. "Tshireletso Protection (1880's-1890's) From the beginning Batswana had Different ideas about the Protectorate."
- van der Hoog, Tycho (2025). Comrades Beyond the Cold War: North Korea and the Liberation of Southern Africa. London, United Kingdom: Hurst Publishers. ISBN 9781805264545. OCLC 1498543281.
