= Macheng (kgosi) =

Ngwato chief (c. 1830–c. 1873)

Kgosi of the Bamangwato
- Reign: 1857–1858; 1866–1872
- Predecessor: Sekgoma I
- Successor: Sekgoma I; Khama III
- Born: c. 1830
- Died: c. 1873
- Father: Sedimo
- Mother: Bobjwale

Macheng (c. 1830 – c. 1873) was the chief, or kgosi, of the Ngwato tribe from 1857 to 1858 and from 1866 to 1872. He succeeded his half-brother Sekgoma I as the rightful heir, but Sekgoma reclaimed power twice in Macheng's life.

== Early life ==
Macheng was born c. 1830 to Sedimo, the regent of the Ngwato tribe, and Bobjwale, the widow of Ngwato kgosi Kgari. He was recognised as issue of Kgari, and was considered Kgari's heir to be kgosi. Macheng was the half-brother of Kgari's children with Bobjwale: Khama II and Mokgokong.

Macheng was taken by Northern Ndebele people as a child, and he grew up in Matabeleland. Kgari's other son, Sekgoma, was made kgosi in his place.

Macheng married a woman named Kwenayagae.

== Kgosi of the Ngwato ==
Macheng returned to the Ngwato in 1857 and he replaced Sekgoma as kgosi. Sekgoma went to the Kwena tribe, allegedly fearing that Macheng would have him killed, and convinced the Kwena kgosi Sechele I to raise an army for him. Macheng ruled with heavy authority as they did in Matabeleland, making him unpopular with elites in the Ngwato tribe. Sekgoma returned with Bakwena soldiers in 1858 and seized power back from Macheng. Macheng went to Lerala where he was given shelter by the Tswapong people, a tributary of the Ngwato. Sekgoma led an expedition to Lerala in response, effectively ending Tswapong control over the area.

Macheng became kgosi again in 1866 after usurping the position from Sekgoma. His reign ended in 1872 when he was overthrown by the son of Sekgoma, Khama III, who then abdicated in favour of his father. The coup was supported by the London Missionary Society.

== Death and legacy ==
Macheng died c. 1873. Khama III overthrew his father Sekgoma I in 1875. Macheng's wife Kwenayage later married kgosi Sechele I of the Kwena tribe.
