= Semane Setlhoko Khama =

- Mohumagadi (queen or queen mother) of the BaNgwato of the Bechuanaland Protectorate
- Semane in 1933
- Born: Semane daughter of Setlhoko; 1881; Tswapong Hills, Botswana
- Died: 1937 (aged 55–56)
- Spouse: Khama III
- Issue: Bonyerile; Tshekedi Khama
- Occupation: Educator, modern medicine advocate

Semane Setlhoko Khama (1881–1937) was a mohumagadi (queen mother) of the BaNgwato Kingdom in the Bechuanaland Protectorate. Educated in a missionary school, she became a teacher and upon her marriage to Khama III continued to press for education for the BaNgwato. A proponent of modern medicine, she was influential in bringing modern midwifery to the area. As a devout Christian, she encouraged women's involvement in the church and the Woman's Christian Temperance Union.

== Early life ==
Semane daughter of Setlhoko was born in 1881 in the area where the Tswapong Hills meets the Limpopo River valley. She was a descendant of the Ba-Birwa and the Ba-Seleka peoples, who had traditionally been vassals of the BaNgwato. She attended missionary school, studying under Alice Young of the London Missionary Society. The school was established in Phalatswe in 1894 and was the first formal education offered to the BaNgwato. Students studied arithmetic, domestic sciences, drawing, geography, music, reading, sewing and writing. When Young left in 1898, she was followed by Ella Sharp, who ran both the regular school and a normal school. From the age of 16, Semane assisted Young in the instruction of music and needlework, and by the time she completed her teacher training she was able to teach all the courses offered at the school.

== Later life ==
Though a commoner, and not approved of by many BaNgwato because of her status, Semane was selected by Bessie Ratshosa to marry her father Khama III. Ratshosa picked Semane because of her commitment to Christianity and teaching, believing that she would be a modern role model for BaNgwato women. Khama had previously been married three times, divorcing one wife and being widowed twice. In 1900, Semane became his fourth wife and the couple would have five children, though only two–a daughter, Bonyerile, and a son, Tshekedi–survived childhood.

Semane continued to instruct students at the school run by Sharp at Serowe and at the school at the Kgotla, the traditional tribal meeting place. One of her students, Seretse Khama, was later to become the first President of Botswana. She was one of the first educated women to press for educational development among the BaNgwato and "made a significant contribution" to Botswana's education system. As an advocate of modern medicine, she was also involved in spreading midwifery practices among the BaNgwato.

Semane and Khama III, as Christians, promoted their faith to the BaNgwato and attempted to outlaw consumption of liquor. As a senior deaconess in the church, she pressed for women to join the church, teaching them to become instructors for other women and girls. Her husband died in 1923 and was succeeded by his son, Sekgoma II, a child of his first marriage to Mma-Besi. Though she remained in the royal household, her position was less prominent. When Sekgoma took ill, she became his nurse, though that created further conflict, as his sisters favored treatment by Tswana healers, rather than European physicians. When he died in 1925, Semane was accused of causing his death through poisoning and witchcraft and narrowly escaped being lynched.

Against her wishes, Semane's son, Tshekedi, was unable to finish his schooling, as he was called home by the village elders to become regent for Sekgoma's son, Seretse. She had hoped he would be able to finish his education before becoming regent. Under his regency, she gained popularity and became a significant factor for pushing the levels of women's education and their political activism. In 1930, she formed a branch of the Woman's Christian Temperance Union known as the Women's Regiment of Beer and encouraged her son in his efforts to ban alcohol. She also supported his marriage in 1936 to Bagakgametse, who would be accused the following year of poisoning and witchcraft related to Semane's death. An autopsy confirmed there was no evidence of poisoning.

== Legacy ==
The roots of political involvement by women's church groups and "still fractious politics of temperance in Botswana" can still be traced to Semane and her influence. She is remembered as a pioneer in the educational development of Botswana.
