= Thune =

Thune may refer to:

- Thune (company), a Norwegian manufacturing company
- Thune (surname), a Norwegian name (includes a list of people with the name)
- Thune (station), light rail station on the Oslo Tramway
- Thune (Lippe), a river of North Rhine-Westphalia, Germany
- Thune (Braunschweig), a quarter in the borough of Wenden-Thune-Harxbüttel in Braunschweig, Germany
- Thune (Motloutse), a river in Botswana, a tributary of the Motloutse
- Thune Dam, a dam in Botswana
