= Sekgoma I =

Ngwato chief (c. 1815–1883)

Kgosi of the Bamangwato
- Reign: 1834–1857; 1858–1866; 1873–1875
- Predecessor: Khama II
- Successor: Macheng; Khama III
- Born: c. 1815
- Died: 1883
- Issue: 16, including Khama III and Kgamane
- Father: Kgari
- Mother: Dibeelane

Sekgoma I (c. 1815–1883) was the kgosi, or chief, of the Ngwato tribe for three periods between c. 1834 and 1875. First taking power after the death of his half-brother Khama II, Sekgoma stepped down in 1857 upon the return of the heir, Macheng. Sekgoma fled to the Kwena tribe where kgosi Sechele I armed him with soldiers, allowing him to retake power in 1858. He came into conflict with his sons Khama III and Kgamane in the 1860s when they chose Christianity over traditional religion, and he was overthrown by Macheng in 1866. Khama III restored Sekgoma to power in 1873 but then overthrew him in 1875.

== Early life ==
Sekgoma was born c. 1815 to Kgari, the kgosi of the Kwena tribe, and Dibeelane. He was the half-brother of Khama II and Mokokong by his father. Dibeelane was a junior wife of Kgari, meaning that Sekgoma was not Kgari's heir and that he was only to inherit the chiefdom because the true heir, Macheng, was missing in Matabeleland.

== Kgosi of the Ngwato tribe ==
Sekgoma succeeded his half-brother Khama II as kgosi of the Kwena tribe upon Khama's death c. 1834, and he abdicated to Macheng upon the latter's return in 1857. Sekgoma went to the Kwena tribe, allegedly fearing that Macheng would have him killed, and convinced the Kwena kgosi Sechele I to raise an army for him. Sekgoma returned with Bakwena soldiers in 1858 and seized power back from Macheng. Macheng's firm rule, reminiscent of the Northern Ndebele people in Matabeleland, had made him unpopular with the elites in the Ngwato tribe and brought calls for Sekgoma's return.

Sekgoma negotiated the creation of a missionary station with the Hermannsburg Mission, led by Heinrich C. Schulenburg. He did this in 1859 after Sechele negotiated a similar arrangement for the Kwena tribe to appease Afrikaners and prevent them from raiding. Sekgoma led an expedition against the Tswapong people in Lerala, a tributary of the Ngwato, in the 1860s after they gave shelter to Macheng. This effectively ended Tswapong control over the area.

Sekgoma enlisted several men to travel to the Kwena tribe in 1862 where they were to put a curse on the tribe's cornfields, but they were caught. The Kwena kgosi Sechele responded in late 1864 when he launched an unsuccessful attack against the Ngwato tribe. Sekgoma adhered to traditional religious practices, but his sons Khama III and Kgamane were Christians and refused to participate in the traditional bogwera rite of passage. Sekgoma sent men to put a curse on Khama upon his refusal in 1865, but Khama did not believe in the magic they claimed to have in traditional religion. The conflict escalated to the point of civil war in 1866, but Sekgoma was removed from power by Macheng the same year. In 1873, Sekgoma was returned to power by his son Khama, who had led a coup against Macheng in 1872. Sekgoma was overthrown by Khama in 1875.

== Death and legacy ==
Sekgoma died in 1883 in Serowe. Sekgoma married eleven women, and he had sixteen children over the course of his life: Khama III, Kgamanae, Seretse, Kebailele, Mphoeng, Mokutshwane, Ikitseng, Seeletso, Moloi, Nkate, Rraditladi, Ramorotong, Seropola, Badirwang, and Baudube.
