= Gobojango =

Coordinates: 21°50′S 28°44′E

Gobojango, locally known as Gobas (/ɡʊbʌs/), is a village in the Central District, Botswana; more specifically in the Bobirwa Sub-District.

== Location ==
It is near Semolale and Mabolwe Village. Semolale is 12 km and Mabolwe is 16 km east of the village. The Metsimaswaane River is west of the old village. Gobojango is kilometres from the historic place Gobadwe Hill, the ostensible origin for all Babirwa. Babirwa were under the rule of Bakalanga Chief, Mambo at the Gobadwe Hill and he left them to establish his kingdom in Alesupi in modern-day Zimbabwe. The Mokgethi family has ruled the village since their arrival from Zimbabwe. The Mokgethi family descends from Mare who was the son of Nkgwana.

== Mokgethi family ==
Nkgwana and Mokgadi were sisters. One brother failed to marry and therefore died without a son, thus leaving no heir. The family decided that the eldest daughter, Nkgwana should marry a close relative to allow them to keep their chieftaincy. Instead, she had a son with a man who was not related to her by blood. The son was referred to as Mare, meaning not the real blood chief. During those days they were living in modern-day Zimbabwe, on the other side of the Shashe River. Mokgadi married there, but divorced her husband and crossed the Shashe river to present-day Botswana. Mokgadi's sons became chiefs on this side of the Shashe River. Mare begot Mokgethi who became the paramount chief.

== History ==
One day Mokgethi committed an offence in Zimbabwe, and instead of waiting for trial he escaped into Botswana. By that time Khama had already gathered Babirwa together. He arrived in Gobojango and found his cousin Phole already a chief. Phole was told to give his seat to Mokgethi because he is the eldest. Phole therefore moved to Tsetsebjwe and established the Tsetsebjwe village. [the reason Phole was told to step down for Mokgethi was that her mother, Mokgadi was married but divorced and Mokgadi went and lived in her father's house with her children called "maphole" as they were not real sons of the palace but rather the nephews to the chief. On the other hand, Nkgwana who is Mokgethi's mother was chosen to bear chiefs].

With all these conflicts about Bobirwa chieftaincy, Mokgethi was treated as not worthy because he was born out of a mix of royal blood and the man from elsewhere that Nkgwana chose to make children with. He was also not from the male lineage but female lineage which is often the weaker lineage in Babirwa custom.

== Education ==
Gobojango has one primary school called Kobojango Primary School, and a junior secondary school called Gobojango Junior Secondary School (Gobojango CJSS). Gobojango CJSS accommodates students from the three villages: Mabolwe, Semolale and Gobojango. Naming the school produced a dispute over its name. Inhabitants of Semolale and Mabolwe wanted it to be named after the first two letters of their village names; i.e. MASEGO CJSS.

== Location ==
The village is located 36 km from Bobonong, the capital of the Bobirwa Sub District. Qualifying students are enrolled in Matshekge Hill Senior Secondary School in Bobonong (commonly referred to as Ma-Hill Senior) for a 2-year period (form 4 and form 5).

== Culture ==
The people of Gobojango are mainly farmers. However, in recent years farming has been limited by severe droughts, inconsistent rainfall and foot and mouth disease. The 2012 drought left many inhabitants with no cattle. Even escalating numbers of border crossing crime left the villagers with no cattle.
