= Molalatau =

Molaladau
- Village
- Location within Botswana
- Coordinates: 22.07369°S 28.59825°E
- Country: Botswana
- District: Central District
- Sub-District: Bobirwa

Molalatau is a village in Central District of Botswana. It is located in the eastern tip of Botswana, within 100 km distance from the borders with Zimbabwe and South Africa. The population was 3,107 in 2011 census. There are no major economic activities in the village since the people are subsistence farmers.

Molalatau translates to mean "Lion's Den" in Setswana and is located about 20 km from Bobonong village which is home to the sub-district administration centre. The residents of Molalatau are Babirwa and they speak a parlance called sebirwa - they formerly originate from the far eastern tip of the country in the area around the confluence of Limpopo-Motloutse rivers. They were forcefully removed from this area by the colonial administration, acting under pressure from a powerful businessman in the name of Cecil John Rhodes, whose company - British South Africa Company (BSC), was allocated the land stretching almost the length of Limpopo river within Botswana by Khama III. The land given to BSC included an area formerly a homestead to the Babirwa people, which was rezoned into commercial farms that were sold to white settlers.

This clan of Babirwa people was led to the area now called Molalatau by chief Malema after he had a bitter disagreement with Khama III, who enjoyed complete support of the colonial administration.
