= Tshekedi Khama =

Regent King (Kgosi) of Bechuanaland, Ruler of the Bangwato people of central Botswana

- King (Kgosi) of Bechuanaland, Ruler of the Bangwato people of central Botswana; Paramount of the bamaNgwato
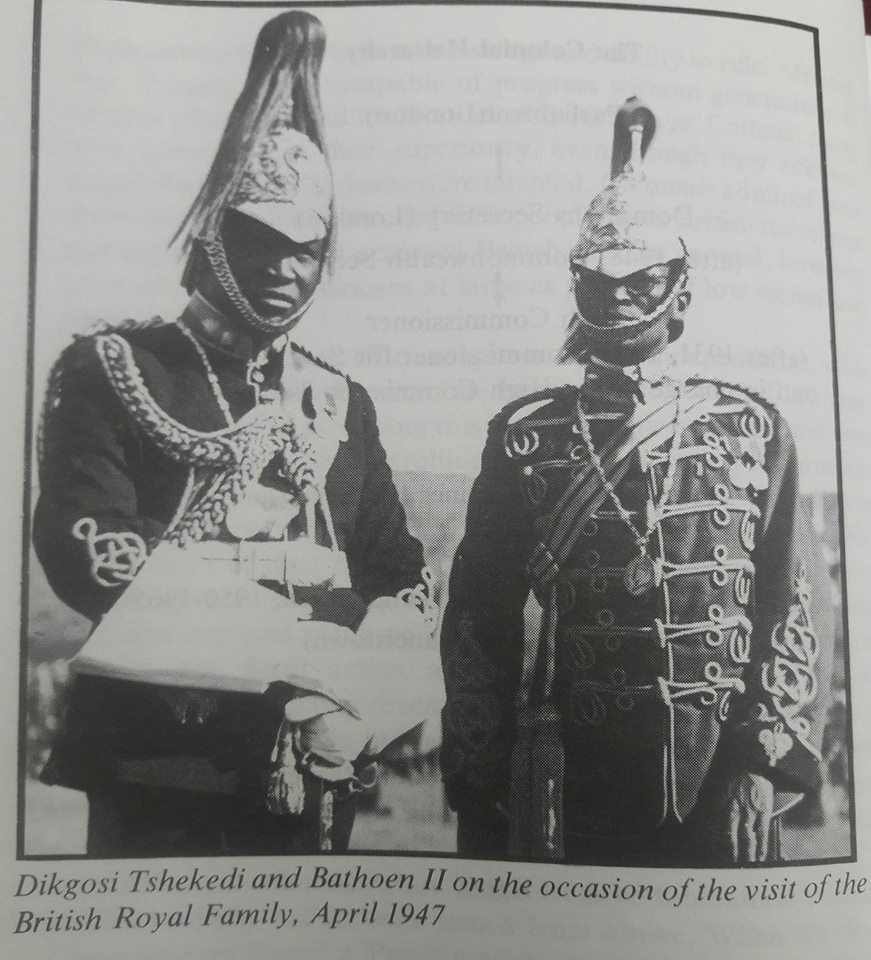
- Dikgosi Tshekedi and Bathoen II on the occasion of the visit of the British royal Family in April 1947
- Predecessor: Sekgoma II
- Born: 17 September 1905; Bechuanaland
- Died: 10 June 1959 (aged 53); London
- Father: Khama III
- Mother: Semane Setlhoko Khama

Tshekedi Khama (17 September 1905 – 10 June 1959) was the regent-king of the Bamangwato tribe in 1926 after the death of Sekgoma II.

== Background ==
Tshekedi Khama was born in Serowe, the son of Khama III, known as Khama the Great, by his fourth wife Semane Setlhoko. He was educated in Serowe, then at Lovedale, a Church of Scotland school in Cape Province. In 1923 he enrolled in the South African Native College in Fort Hare.

Khama III named his son Tshekedi as heir to the throne, passing over another son, Sekgoma II, with whom he had quarreled. Khama set aside the decision in 1916 when he reconciled with Sekgoma. On the death of Khama III in 1923 Sekgoma II succeeded as king, but his reign was ended by his early death in 1925. Sekgoma's heir, Seretse Khama, was still a minor, and Tshekedi was named regent for the duration of Seretse's minority. A regency council was named to assist during Tshekedi's absence at the Native College.

== Regency ==
Tshekedi was installed regent on 9 January 1926, and promptly dissolved the regency council. In order to consolidate his position, he banished the influential Ratshosa family and destroyed their property. The Ratshosa sued Tshekedi, who ultimately prevailed in the Judicial Committee of the Privy Council. The incident prompted Sir Charles Rey, the British Resident Commissioner, to try to curb the chief's powers, as a result of which the two men frequently clashed. In 1933, Tshekedi had Phineas McIntosh, a white man, flogged in public. Rey used the opportunity to suspend Tshekedi as regent, and had Royal Marines sent from Cape Town. An inquiry led by Admiral Edward Evans, the acting high commissioner, led to Tshekedi being deposed from his office, but he was quickly reinstated.

As regent, Tshekedi opposed both the diminution of chiefly authority and attempts by South Africa to annex the protectorate. During World War II he strongly supported the British and encouraged enlistment in the British forces.

After the Second World War, he lobbied internationally against Jan Smuts' proposals for South Africa to annex South-West Africa. His efforts helped garner support internationally against annexation and contributed to Smut's motion to do so not receiving UN approval, despite British efforts to silence him. Mark Mazower notes this as being both the first time in modern history that one 'African political leader lobbied internationally on behalf of another dependency' and that he was perhaps the only African figure to defeat Smuts.

=== Opposition to Seretse's marriage ===
In 1948 Seretse Khama, who was then studying in England, informed Tshekedi that he intended to marry Ruth Williams, an English woman. Tshekedi opposed the marriage, as did the South African and Rhodesian governments. Initially, Tshekedi managed to maintain his support, but at a kgotla on 20 June 1949 Seretse managed to secure the support of most of his people, some of whom suspected that Tshekedi opposed Seretse in order to secure the kingship for himself. After Seretse was acclaimed paramount chief, Tshekedi and some of his followers went into temporary exile in Rametsana, in the Kweneng district of Botswana. In 1950 both Seretse and Tshekedi were exiled by the British, although Tshekedi was allowed to return in 1952 as a private citizen.

== Post-regency ==
Tshekedi was appointed a member of the 'African Authority' by the British government in 1953, along with his relative Rasebolai Kgamane. In 1956, he reconciled with Seretse, and went to London to secure the latter's return. After the return of Seretse, the three men formed a triumvirate at the centre of the protectorate's political life. Tshekedi pushed for the consolidation of local democracy and constitutional change, which eventually led to the protectorate's independence as Botswana.

Shortly after the conclusion of an important minerals agreement, initiated by Tshekedi, with the Rhodesian Selection Trust in 1959, Tshekedi's health deteriorated, and he was rushed to London for medical treatment. He died at The London Clinic of kidney failure on 10 June 1959, and his body was returned for burial in front of a large crowd at the family's burial ground on 17 June.

== Family ==
Tshekedi married Bagakgametse Moloi in 1936, but the marriage was quickly dissolved. He married secondly Ella Moshoela in 1938; they had five children.

Chief Khama's daughter, Princess Semane, married the king of the Royal Bafokeng Nation in South Africa. Among the descendants of this union is the current king of the Bafokeng, Leruo Molotlegi.

== In popular culture ==
Chief Khama was portrayed by the South African actor Vusi Kunene in the Hollywood film A United Kingdom.

== Bibliography ==
- Benson, Mary (1960). Tshekedi Khama. Faber and Faber.
