= Archelaus Tsoebebe =

Motswana politician

- Archelaus Tsoebebe

Minister of Labour and Social Services
- In office 1965–1969

Member of the National Assembly from Bobirwa
- In office 1965–1969

Personal details
- Born: 29 January 1904 Matatiele District, Cape Colony
- Died: 1986 (aged 81–82) Mahalapye, Botswana

Archelaus Moleleki Tsoebebe (29 January 1904 – 1986) was a Motswana politician of Sotho descent. He was a co-founder of the Botswana Democratic Party, which he represented in the National Assembly of Botswana from 1965 to 1969. He served in the Cabinet of Botswana as the Minister of Labour and Social Services.

== Biography ==
Archelaus Moleleki Tsoebebe was born to a Sotho family on 29 January 1904 at the Mafube Mission in the Matatiele District of the Cape Colony. He graduated from school in 1920 and trained as a teacher at the Mvenyane Institution from 1922 to 1924 and at Lovedale from 1925 to 1926. He then taught at Lovedale from 1927 to 1928 before attending Fort Hare from 1929 to 1931. He then moved to the Bechuanaland Protectorate, where he worked as a principal from 1932 to 1938. He founded the African Teachers' Association in 1937, and he founded the Bechuanaland Civil Servants' Association after joining the civil service in 1949.

Tsoebebe was a prominent political figure of the Bechuanaland Protectorate while it was under British control. In 1959, he offered his support to the protectorate's first major political party, the Bechuanaland Protectorate Federal Party. He was elected to the Bamangwato Tribal Council in 1960. On 19 April 1961, Tsoebebe was one of the men elected to represent the northern region of the protectorate, serving for three years.

Tsoebebe joined the Bechuanaland People's Party in 1961, but he was disappointed by its lack of support for the protectorate's tribal population. He joined Seretse Khama and Quett Masire in drafting a constitution for the Botswana Democratic Party (then known as the Bechuanaland National Democratic Party). The party was formed in January 1962, and Tsoebebe was chosen as its vice president. When Botswana became an independent nation in 1965, Tsoebebe was elected to the 1st Parliament of Botswana, representing Bobirwa constituency. He was also appointed to the Cabinet of Botswana as the Minister of Labour and Social Services. He was awarded the Presidential Order of Honour in 1968, and his term ended in 1969. Tsoebebe had little political involvement thereafter, and he died in Mahalapye in 1986.
