= Shaw Kgathi =

Botswana politician

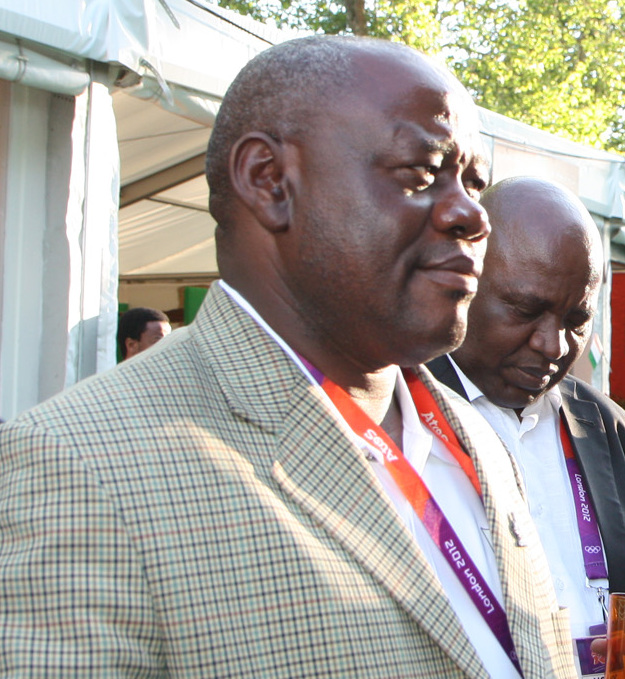
- Kgathi in 2012

Minister of Defence, Justice and Security
- In office 31 October 2014 – 2019
- President: Ian Khama
- Preceded by: Dikgakgamatso Seretse

Member of Parliament for Bobirwa
- In office 2004–2019
- Succeeded by: Taolo Lucas

Personal details
- Born: 18 October 1961 (age 64) Bobonong, Bechuanaland
- Party: BDP

Shaw Kgathi is a Motswana politician from Botswana.

In 2009, he was elected as the Minister of Youth, Sport, and Culture.

He was a member of the Parliament of Botswana and represented Bobirwa from 2009–2019.

Kgathi had previously held sports positions, including sports master at junior and senior schools and was also a Director in the Department of Sports and Recreation and Supreme Council for Sports.
