= Eloyi Christian Church =

- Classification: Apostolic
- Moderator: Archbishop Sekai Jakoba (April 2022 to date)
- Headquarters: Tsetsebjwe
- Founder: Archbishop Jakoba Keiphile(1955 to August 2021)
- Origin: 1955; Tsetsebjwe, Botswana
- Other name: Eloyi

The Eloyi Christian Church was founded by Archbishop Jakoba Keiphile -a-Seduma in 1955 in the small village of Tsetsebjwe, to the southeast of Selebi Phikwe in Botswana. The Church has since spread across Botswana and into neighboring countries like South Africa and Zimbabwe. It has attracted much attention for its dramatic scenes and exorcisms of demons.

The church began to expand in 2005 after Jakoba grew old and handed over responsibility to his children. As of 2005 the church was based in the north part of Botswana. In early 2005 church members hunted and dismembered a snake that they said was terrorizing a Tlokweng family. During the 2005-2007 period the church gained a large amount of media coverage due to the dramatic exorcisms of demons practiced during its services. The church revives traditional Tswana practices in an Old Testament and new form.

By the end of 2022 the church had around 150,000 members in branches throughout Botswana, Zimbabwe and in South Africa. It has more than 170 branches currently.

The church has its origins in the American revivalist movement of the late nineteenth century. The church baptises its members with full immersion in Jordan. (Note: Every river is Jordan during baptism.)

The church is the subject of the 56-minute documentary film Encountering Eloyi (2008) directed by Richard Werbner. The film tells of a childless couple who have tried both traditional medicine and Western hospitals without success. The woman turns to the church to be healed of her barrenness.

In August 2021 the Church founder archbishop, Jakoba Keiphile -a-Seduma, died at the age of 93. His son Bishop Sekai Jakoba was then chosen as an archbishop to lead the church in April 2022 at the age of 60.
