= Richard Werbner =

American anthropologist (born 1937)

Richard P. Werbner
- Born: August 11, 1937 (age 88); Boston, Massachusetts, U.S.
- Occupation: Anthropologist
- Known for: Tears of the Dead: The Social Biography of an African Family

Richard P. Werbner (born August 11, 1937) is an American anthropologist who specializes in the Zimbabwe and Botswana region, including ritual, personal and historical narrative, politics, law, regional analysis. He has taught at the University of Manchester since 1961.

== Biography ==
Professor Richard Werbner was born in Boston, Massachusetts, on 11 August 1937. He studied at Brandeis University, conducting fieldwork among the Winnebago of Nebraska in 1958 and graduating with a BA in 1959. He obtained a Fulbright Scholarship in 1959, through which he was able to go to the United Kingdom to study at Manchester University. He began field studies in southern Africa in 1960 among the Kalanga people, first in Zimbabwe and later in Botswana, and then among the Tswapong people in Botswana. In 1961 he was appointed a research assistant at Manchester University. In 1968 he obtained a PhD from Manchester University.

He married and is the father of two children. His wife Pnina Werbner, also a professor of anthropology, was the niece of Max Gluckman, a South African anthropologist who did important work in Barotseland and was a leading figure at the Manchester school. After Gluckman died in 1975, Werbner assumed the role of continuing his legacy at the Manchester school.

He has taught as a visitor at the Catholic University of Leuven, the Hebrew University of Jerusalem, the University of California, Berkeley, the Smithsonian Institution, Washington, D.C., the University of Bergen, the University of California, San Diego, Macquarie University, Sydney, the Australian National University, Canberra, the University of Hradec Králové, Czech Republic and the University of Botswana, Gaborone. As of 2012 Werbner was Professor Emeritus in African Anthropology, Honorary Research Professor in Visual Anthropology, and Director of the International Centre for Contemporary Cultural Research at Manchester University.

== Reception ==
Werbner won the Amaury Talbot Prize of the Royal Anthropological Institute for his 1991 book Tears of the Dead: The Social Biography of an African Family.

Mieka Ritsema, writing of Werbner's Reasonable Radicals and Citizenship in Botswana: The Public Anthropology of Kalanga Elites in the African Studies Review, described it as "a fascinating account of the state-making practices of elites, and especially minority elites, in Botswana... Werbner composes a powerful narrative, rich in documentation and insight developed from more than forty years of commitment to Botswana." Ritsema called the book a "seminal work of engaged retrospection."

== Bibliography ==
- Werbner, Richard P. (1977). Regional cults. Academic Press. ISBN 978-0-12-744950-0.
- Werbner, Richard P. (1982). Land reform in the making: tradition, public policy and ideology in Botswana. R. Collings. ISBN 978-0-86036-186-2.
- Werbner, Richard P. (1989). Ritual Passage, Sacred Journey: The Process and Organization of Religious Movement. Manchester University Press ND. ISBN 978-0-7190-1929-6.
- Werbner, Richard P. (1991). Tears of the Dead: The Social Biography of an African Family. Edinburgh University Press. ISBN 978-0-7486-0304-6.
- Werbner, Richard P., ed. (2002). Postcolonial Subjectivities in Africa. Zed Books. ISBN 978-1-85649-955-2.
- Werbner, Richard P., ed. (1998). Memory and the postcolony: African anthropology and the critique of power. Zed Books. ISBN 978-1-85649-591-2.
- Werbner, Richard P. (2004). Reasonable Radicals and Citizenship in Botswana: The Public Anthropology of Kalanga Elites. Indiana University Press. ISBN 978-0-253-34402-1.

== Films ==
Werbner directed a series of documentary films under the overall title The Well Being Quest in Botswana, which were published by the University of Manchester.

- 2004 Seance Reflections with Richard Werbner (45 minute documentary)
- 2006 Shade Seekers and the Mixer (60-minute documentary)
- 2008 Encountering Eloyi (56-minute documentary)
- 2009 Holy Hustlers (53-minute documentary)

Seance Reflections documents a childless couple who try to recover their well-being by consulting a charismatic diviner and healer in the village of Moremi. Later they review and discuss the film of their seances. In Shade Seekers and the Mixer, the elders of a village, including a controversial healer, view and discuss an earlier film of the healer's séances with a former patient who is now Werber's research assistant. Encountering Eloyi continues the story of the childless couple, who have now tried both traditional medicine and Western hospitals without success. The woman turns to the Eloyi Christian Church to be healed of her barrenness. Holy Hustlers document a split within the Eloyi Christian Church between the village-based archbishop and his son, the city based bishop, and shows the tension between holiness and hustling.
