= Mma-Besi =

- mohumagadi (queen or queen mother) of the BaNgwato of the Bechuanaland Protectorate,
- Born: Mma-Besi c. 1846

Mma-Besi or Mabisa (1846 – 1889) was a mohumagadi (queen or queen mother) of the BaNgwato of the Bechuanaland Protectorate, now Botswana, and the first wife of king Khama III. She was also known as Elisabeta Gobitsamang Khama.

== Personal life ==
She was baptized as Elisabeta in 1862, taking the name in honour of Elizabeth Moffat, daughter of Robert Moffat. She was married that same year in what was the first Christian marriage held in Shoshong. Her first child, a daughter, was called Besi, and so she became Mma-Besi due to the tradition of taking the name "mother of" one's firstborn. Her one son who lived, Sekgoma, became king when Khama III died in 1923, but passed away in November 1925. She herself died at the age of 44, probably of malaria due to Khama III moving the capital to the Tswapong Hills.
