= Moremi, Botswana =

Moremi
- Village
- Location within Botswana
- Coordinates: 22.572002°S 27.447719°E
- Country: Botswana
- District: Central District
- Time zone: UTC+2 (Central Africa Time)
  - Summer (DST): UTC+2 (not observed)

Moremi is a village in the Central District of Botswana, about 40 kilometres (25 mi) east of Palapye. The village lies in a bend of the Lotsane River, a seasonal tributary of the Limpopo River. It lies just north of the dramatic Tswapong Hills.

The Moremi-Mannonye Community Trust charges an entrance fee to the Moremi Gorge heritage site, an area where perennial streams have cut deep gorges into the hills, with waterfalls cascading into deep pools surrounded by lush vegetation. The gorges are home to many birds that feeds on the fish and small crabs in the pools, and are breeding grounds for the endangered Cape vulture. Leopard, hyena and kudu live in the hills, and the cliffs above the gorge harbour baboons, rock rabbits and dassies. The Botswana Tourism Organization is building a bridge for motor vehicles across the Lotsane River, and is building tourist accommodations and nature trails in the Moremi - Mannonye Conservation Area. Traditionally the gorge is believed to have magical powers, and ancestral spirits are thought to live in the hills.

The 2004 documentary film Seance Reflections, directed by Richard Werbner, documents a childless couple who try to recover their well-being by consulting a charismatic diviner and healer in the village of Moremi.

== Gallery ==
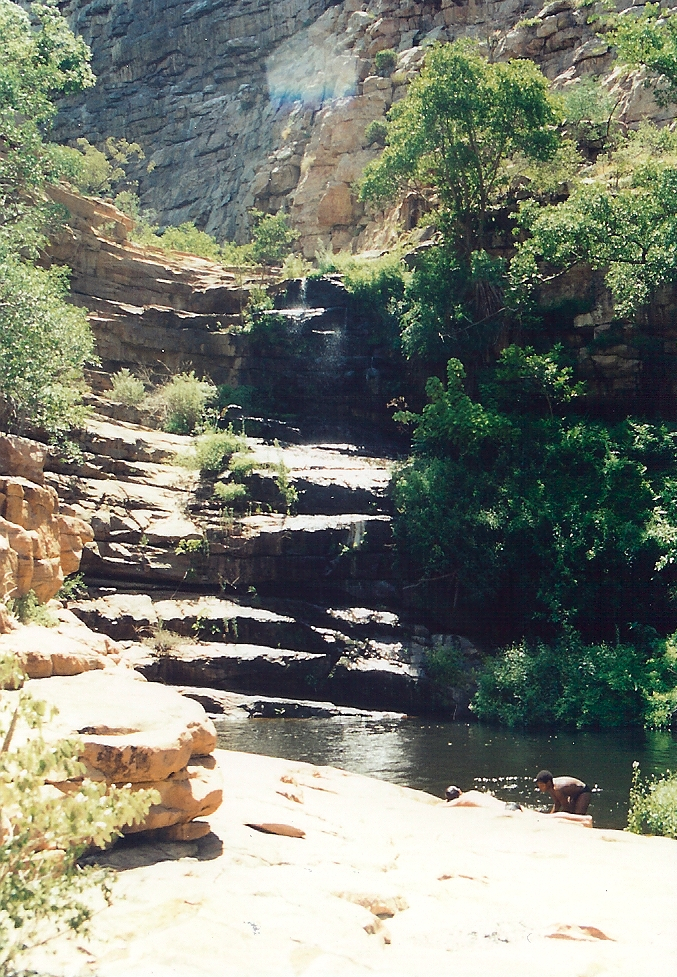
Boys playing in a stream in Moremi Gorge

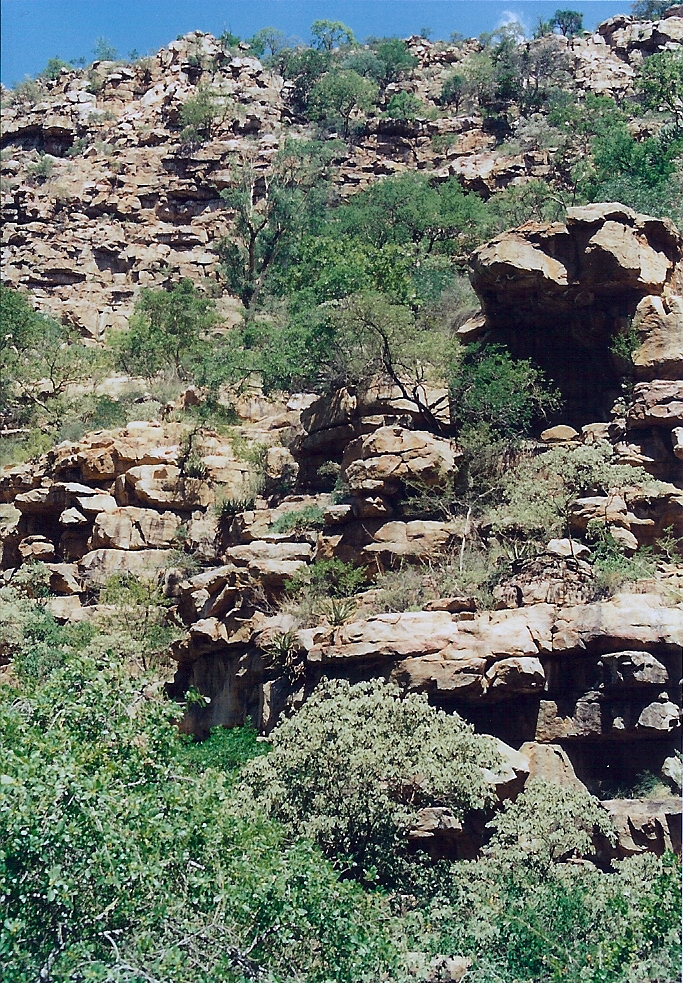
The hills provide one of Botswana's two breeding sites for the endangered Cape vulture
