= Leruo Molotlegi =

King of the Royal Bafokeng Nation since 2000

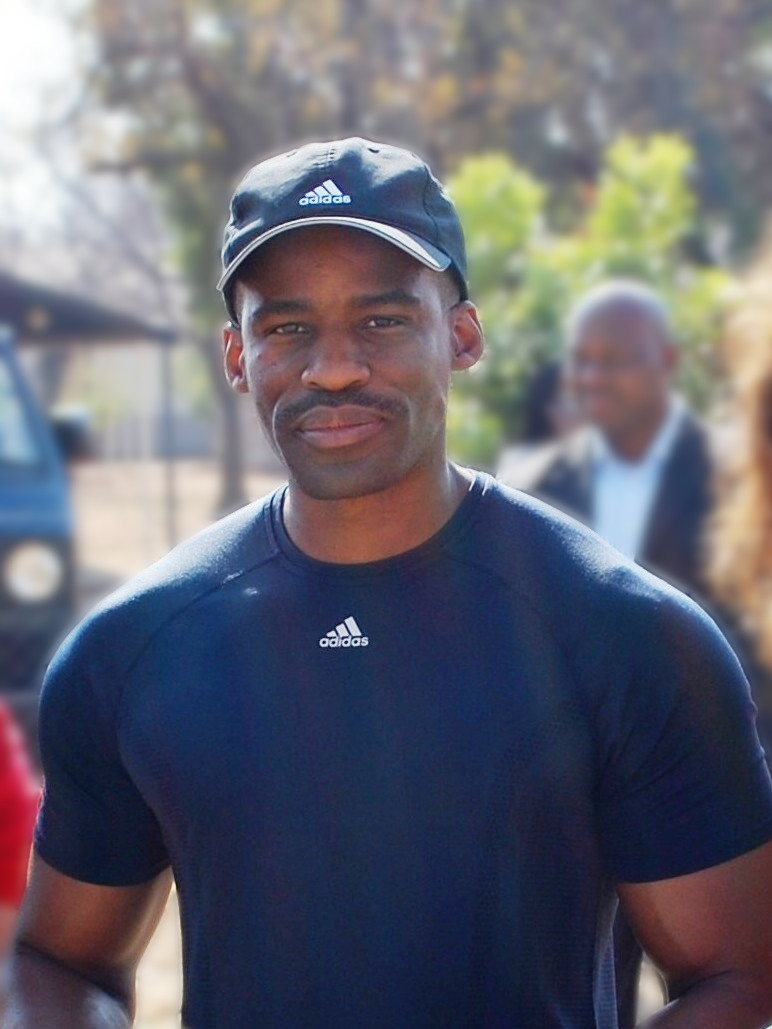
- Molotlegi in 2010

King of the Royal Bafokeng Nation
- Reign: 2000 - present
- Predecessor: Kgosi Mollwane Molotlegi
- Born: Leruo Tshekedi Molotlegi; 1968 (age 57–58); South Africa
- House: Molotlegi

Leruo Tshekedi Molotlegi (born 1968) is the 36th kgosi, or king, of the Royal Bafokeng Nation. The Bafokeng nation is located in North West Province of the Republic of South Africa.

== Biography ==
Molotlegi has served as Kgosi since 2000, when he succeeded his brother, Mollwane Lebone II Molotlegi. Molotlegi's official enthronement was not held until 16 August 2003. 3,000 Bafokeng people attended the coronation, which was held at the Royal Bafokeng Stadium in Phokeng, South Africa. Molotlegi is the son of Kgosi Lebone Edward Molotlegi and Queen Semane Molotlegi, Queen Mother of the Bafokeng.

He had five siblings: three brothers and two sisters. Two older brothers are deceased. In addition to being the head of the House of Molotlegi, he is also a matrilineal descendant of the Khama dynasty of Botswana. His grandfather, Chief Tshekedi Khama, was regent of the Bamangwato tribe during the reign of Sir Seretse Khama, his nephew.

He is a former member of the board of Impala Platinum Holdings (Implats), and now sits in the newly established Royal Bafokeng Holdings (RBH) as a non-Executive Director. RBH is a wholly owned Bafokeng company. The Kgosi is also the president of the Mineral Rights Association of Indigenous People of South Africa and was one of the principal negotiators in the new mining legislation, which seeks to encourage significant black participation. He is an alumnus of Hilton College in KwaZulu-Natal, South Africa. He holds a university degree in Architecture and Urban Planning from Natal University. He is a keen sportsman and was awarded a Victor Ludorum Gold Medallion at Hilton. He was appointed Chancellor of the North-West University, North West (South African province) from 2009-2019. He is a fixed wing and rotorcraft pilot and has been appointed as an Honorary Colonel in the South African Air Force.

In 2011, he was an invited guest to the wedding of Albert II, Prince of Monaco, to Zimbabwean swimmer, Charlene Wittstock.
