= Tobane =

- Village
- Location within Botswana
- Coordinates: 21.90701°S 28.04185°E
- Country: Botswana
- District: Central District
- Sub-District: Bobirwa

Tobane is a small village in the eastern part of Botswana about 20 km from the copper/nickel mining town of Selebi-Phikwe. The village has access to the town through a tarred road. The Motloutse River passes the village on the northeastern side. The village has a lot of facilities such as clean water from the Shashe dam, electricity, mobile phone connection through Orange, Bemobile and Mascom wireless. It also has landline service through Botswana Telecommunications Cooperation. There is a clinic, a primary school (Tobane primary school), and a junior school (Motlhasedi I community junior secondary school) in the area. The population of the village is roughly 1925. The regent chief is Nametshego Nengu.
