= Motlhabaneng =

- Village
- Location within Botswana
- Coordinates: 22.177967°S 28.872217°E
- Country: Botswana
- District: Central District
- Time zone: UTC+2 (Central Africa Time)
  - Summer (DST): UTC+2 (not observed)

Motlhabaneng is a village in Botswana on the north bank of the Motloutse River near the borders with South Africa and Zimbabwe. It is on the south-western boundary of the Northern Tuli Game Reserve.

The village is in the Bobirwa region. When the Thune Dam is completed, it will bring water to the village. The village, along with the nearby villages of Lentswe le Moriti and Mathathane and the tour operator Tuli Wilderness Trails, helps operate Molema Bush Camp in the Northern Tuli Game Reserve. There are rock paintings on the outskirts of the village that depict humans, animals, hunting scenes and legendary creatures. These were almost certainly made by the San people, the original inhabitants of the area.
