= Pnina Werbner =

British social anthropologist (1944–2023)

Pnina Werbner (née Gluckman/Gillon; 3 December 1944 – 17 January 2023) was a British social anthropologist. Her work focused on Sufi mysticism, diasporas, Muslim women and public sector unions in Botswana. She wrote extensively about the Arab Spring. Werbner was married to anthropologist Richard Werbner, and was the niece of Max Gluckman.

Werbner completed a PhD in social anthropology at the University of Manchester in 1976. She joined the University of Keele as a senior lecturer in 1997, and was promoted to a full professorship in 2001. After retiring, she maintained honorary status as professor emerita, while continuing to research and publish until her death in 2023.

On cultural hybridity, Werbner argued, with particular reference to the Satanic Verses affair and other global cultural conflicts, for the need to recognise the key distinction first coined by Bakhtin between intentional and organic hybridity, in order to understand the Muslim diasporic offence while avoiding futile debates about cultural reification. In relation to the 'failure' of multiculturalism debate, she advocated analysing multiculturalism from below, and not merely as a top-down policy.

From 2000, Werbner studied the women's movement and the Manual Workers Union in Botswana. Her ethnography, which won an Honorable Mention in 2015 in the Elliot P. Skinner Award from the Association of Africanist Anthropology, analysed the legal mobilisation and struggle for dignity and a living wage of manual public sector workers, both men and women, and traced the evolution of a rooted, working class identity and culture in Botswana, which is both local and cosmopolitan, through cultural performance.

Her work highlighted the vernacular, situated cosmopolitanism of rights activists, trade unionists and feminists in the global south, transnational labour migrants and Sufis. She rejected, however, optimistic views of transnationalism as effacing national boundaries, and argued for the need to recognise the illusion of simultaneity, disguising the ruptures that transnational movement engenders.

She argued that diasporas are internally heterogeneous, imaginatively constructed, transnational moral communities of co-responsibility. She saw the materiality of diaspora as manifested both affectively and aesthetically, with its members willing to mobilize politically and economically across borders in response to the sufferings of fellow diaspora members or crises in the 'home' country.

== Bibliography ==
- African Customary Justice: Living Law, Legal Pluralism, and Public Ethics. Co-authored with Richard Werbner. Routledge, 2022.
- Pilgrims of Love: The Anthropology of a Global Sufi Cult. Indiana University Press, 2003 (Ebook 2017)
- Debating Cultural Hybridity: Multicultural Identities and the Politics of Anti-Racism. Zed Books, 2015
- Political Aesthetics of Global Protest. Co-edited with Martin Webb and Kathryn Spellman-Poots. Edinburgh University Press, 2014
- The Making of an African Working Class: Politics, Law and Cultural Protest in the Manual Workers Union of Botswana. Pluto Press, 2014.
- Anthropology and the New Cosmopolitanism: Rooted, Feminist and Vernacular Perspectives. ASA Monograph No. 45. Bloomsbury, 2008.
- Imagined Diasporas Among Manchester Muslims: The Public Performance of Pakistani Transnational Identity Politics. James Currey, 2002.
- The Migration Process: Capital, Gifts and Offerings among Manchester Pakistanis. 2nd ed. Bloomsbury, 2002.
- Women, Citizenship and Difference. Co-edited with Nira Yuval-Davis. Zed Books, 1999.
- Embodying Charisma: Modernity, Locality and the Performance of Emotion in Sufi Cults. Routledge, 1998.
- Jamal Malik; John Hinnells; Pnina Werbner (2006). "7 - Seekers on the path. Different ways of being a Sufi in Britain". In Malik, Jamal; Hinnells, John (eds.). Sufism in the West (PDF). London; New York: Routledge. doi:10.4324/9780203087206. ISBN 9781134479825. OCLC 1220879424. Archived (PDF) from the original on 20 January 2021.
