= Limpopo-Lipadi Game and Wilderness Reserve =

Game reserve in Botswana

The Limpopo-Lipadi Game and Wilderness Reserve is a large, privately owned game reserve in Botswana which sells shares of that reserve to the public.
