= Kutlwano Magazine =

Botswana magazine

- Publisher: Government of Botswana
- Founded: 1962
- Country: Botswana
- Website: www.kutlwano.gov.bw

Kutlwano Magazine (also known as Kutlwano) is a Botswana magazine founded in 1962 by the Government of Botswana containing market news, government policies, entertainment and feature articles. It is published alongside Daily News Botswana.

== See also ==
- Botswana Television
- Radio Botswana
- Media in Botswana
