= Sefophe =

Coordinates: 22°11′16″S 27°58′14″E

Location of Sefophe

Sefophe is a village in Central District of Botswana. It is located 27 km south-east of the mining town of Selebi-Phikwe, within 100 km distance of borders with Zimbabwe and South Africa. The population was 6,062 in 2011 census.
