= Bobirwa =

Jurisdiction in Botswana

Bobirwa motto: "Bokhujejwa bo ya laghangwa"
- District
- Motto: “Bokhujejwa ba langana”
- Location within Botswana
- Coordinates: 21.97043°S 28.423335°E
- Country: Botswana
- District: Bobirwa District
- Major village: Bobonong

Government
  - kgosi: Joel Masilo

The Bobirwa district is a jurisdiction in Botswana. It is populated by the Babirwa (Ba-Birwa) people who came from Transvaal in present-day South Africa.

== History ==
Before Moshoeshoe and his nation of Lesotho, the Basotho people populated the land. Moshoeshoe is a founder and he establish the Basotho nation, he united refugees from Batswana and nguni speaking people from different clans within present-day Free State and Lesotho, which the British named Lesotho.

Basotho people present in the region before Moshoeshoe were born in Menkhoaneng (c. 1786–11 March 1870) to Mokhachane of the Bamokoteli clan, a sub-clan of Bakwena. Moshoeshoe reunited the remaining smaller and weaker clans of Batswana in the area under his Bakwena clan a breakaway clan from its elder Bakwena tribe of Batswana leadership during Shaka's wars of difaqane, after the rest of the Basotho had left the area.

Moshoeshoe, his Bakwena clan, and the other Basotho clans originated from Batswanaland before settling in Ntswanatsatsi in present-day South Africa. Families dispersed from Ntswanatsatsi, forming clans using totems as symbols (such as the crocodile (Kwena), which Moshoeshoe's ancestors used), and moved in different directions within precolonial South Africa under different leadership.

Napo younger brother to Mochudi (Tswana) left his home to build his own clano in Ntswanatsatsi to the present-day Free State and Lesotho; some moved to present-day Botswana, Zimbabwe, Zambia, and Namibia; while others migrated to present-day Gauteng in South Africa. They became patriarchs of the Bakgatla, which gave rise to Batswana and its various clans with their dialects like Bapedi, Batlokwa, and Babirwa. Some groups intermarried with neighboring tribes like Swatis, Vendas, Tsongas, and Ngunis.

Some Bapedi share the common word "apa" (meaning "talk") with Vendas, particularly the Balovedu, BaGubu, and Babirwa of Bobirwa in southern Botswana near the Zimbabwean border along the Shashe river, with its dialect spoken across the border in Zimbabwe.

After the Batswana dispersal from their cradle, different dialects emerged. The Babirwa people emerged from Nareng in the Letswalo area near Phalaborwa under Tshukudu's leadership between 1510 and 1599. They moved northward, settling in Blauwberg in present-day Limpopo and parts of Botswana and Zimbabwe.

The name "Bobirwa" means "the land of the Ba-Birwa (Babirwa) people". The Babirwa in South Africa live north of the Bochum area, north of Polokwane. There are over 40 Babirwa surnames in South Africa, including Sebone, Malema, Makhura, Maela, Makwati, Makhurane, Maphala, Nare, Tau, Tlou-Serope, Mmamadi, Legong (Lehong), Mangale, Marema, Taueatswala, Molefe, Mogano, Jibula (Tjibula) (Muhanu), Machete, Lehomo, Raphahlelo, Raseokgo (Sebola), Phooko, Ramalepe, Boikanyo, Selema, Morerwa (Murerwa), Makgatho, Maruatona, Monekwe (Monengwe), Madema Morebeng (Phosa) and others.

Many Babirwa migrated to what is now called the Bobirwa District (Republic of Botswana, Government Gazette, December 2022), an administrative region in eastern Botswana within the District (Botswana)District. Bobonong serves as the largest town and district headquarters. The district borders Zimbabwe to the northeast and South Africa to the southeast, with the Limpopo River forming the South African boundary. {Government Gazette; 23rd December 2022 |accessed 2026-11-15}

== Agriculture ==
The Bobirwa District has an average annual rainfall of300 to 400 millimetres (12 to 16 in). Soils are mainly loams to sandy clay loams. Bobirwa is the lowest part of Botswana, varying from 590 to 886 metres (1,936 to 2,907 ft) above sea level. It is intersected by a network of channels that drain into the Limpopo. Villages include Mathathane, Motlhabaneng, Tsetsebjwe, Kobojango, Bobonong, Molaladau, Tobane, Mabolwe, Semolale, Lepokole, Zanzibar, Moletemane, Sefophe and Lentswelemoriti.

Agricultural activities have heavily degraded the district and made it susceptible to drought. Large areas in and around the villages are bare earth caused by clearing grasses to keep snakes and insects away. Overgrazing by sheep, goats, donkeys, and cattle is another cause. A study showed a substantial reduction in natural land cover between 1970 and 2010, combined with a significant increase in population.

In addition to livestock, the district is home to abundant wildlife. In 2000, there was a herd of around 200 elephants.

In 2011, it was reported that the government had approved the establishment of service centers in Tsetsebjwe, Mathathane, and Gobojango, as well as other large infrastructure development projects such as road improvements, bridges, and electrification. This followed rapid economic growth in the previous three years. The local people could now shop and bank in Bobonong, rather than travel to Selebi-Phikwe. The new centers were expected to improve access to services further.

In 2012, there was a sharp increase in stock theft. This may have been caused by drought, which forced livestock to travel long distances to find grazing and water, making them vulnerable to rustlers.

== Ethnography ==
The Babirwa people in Zimbabwe are found in the southwest of Gwanda District, in the villages of Gungwe, Ntalale, Tlhakadiyawa, Kafusi, Mawaza, Mafukung, and surrounding areas. When the Babirwa moved into what is now known as Gwanda, the area was inhabited by Jahunda (Kalanga dialect) speaking people and a group of Ndebele. The Ndebele had moved southward from northern precolonial Matabeleland South Province, which they had invaded under their leader Mzilikazi. Mzilikazi had come from Transvaal, South Africa, via Southern Botswana, fleeing from the Boers after previously escaping from Shaka in Natal. Another group of Babirwa left Bobirwa with other Transvaal migrants and joined their relatives who had left Transvaal for Bokgalaka (what the Sotho then called Zimbabwe).

Not all Basotho in Zimbabwe are Babirwa. The Sotho people found in the Beit Bridge district to Manama and surrounding areas are distinct - they are descendants of North Sotho from the former Northern Transvaal. These people were displaced by the Boers and forced to flee, crossing either the Motloutse River to present-day Botswana or the Odi (Limpopo) River to Bokgalaka. These Basotho traveled in related groups, coming from various areas of Northern Transvaal, from as far as Potgietersrus (now Mokopane). Others came from areas around Polokwane including Moletse, Bochum, Taaibosch, Zebediela, Ga Kibi, Botlokwa, Ga Makgato. Some were from Venda, while others were Tsonga speakers who adopted the Zimbabwean Sotho dialect through association and marriage.

Some descendants returned to South Africa between the 1920s and 1980s, reuniting with their relatives in Northern Transvaal. Today, many Pedi and Venda-speaking people in Limpopo and Venda regions have Zimbabwean roots from this migration. Some Zimbabwean Basotho maintain connections with their ancestral relatives in both South Africa and Botswana. The Sotho spoken in Zimbabwe, similar to that spoken in Musina and surroundings, is a modified form of Kubu and resembles Selobedu. There are subtle differences between Sebirwa, SeGubu, Setlhokwa, Selobedu, and other Northern Sotho dialects that use "apa" (talk) and "boswa" for "pap" (maize porridge staple food). These languages share common Venda elements and surnames like Malema, Mafela, Moedi, Mahomela, and Mokoena.

While surnames traditionally indicate identity, many Basotho lost their original surnames when the Ndebele forced them to adopt totem-based surnames. As a result, some Sotho people now use surnames like Ndlovu, Nyathi, Sibanda, Moyo, Dube, and Mdlongwa instead of their original family names. However, many Northern Sotho patriarchs still maintain their South African surnames such as Maphala, Malema, Sephuma, Mafela, Phalandwa, Molwantwa, Sephodi, Makgalema, Moedi, Sehata, Tjibula, Makushu, Mahumela, Madumetja, Makhura, Makwati, Maimela, Manamela, Pheta, Mokone, Mokwena, and Marishane, even if these names do not appear on official documents.

== Language ==
Sebirwa or Birwa, the language spoken by the Babirwa people, is a dialect of Northern Sotho, along with Bididi, Lobedu, Kgaga, Hananwa, Pedi, Phalaborwa, Pulana, Tshwapong, Kutswe, Phahladira, Pai, Kopa, Kubu, etc. Northern Sotho is one of three Sesotho subgroups of Basotho. The two others are Western Sotho (better known as Setswana, which is largely spoken in Botswana), North West Province, a small number of people in Matebeland Province of Zimbabwe and Southern Sotho (spoken in Lesotho, Free State, and Vaal). The Basotho came from Ntswanatsatsi.
