= Mosu =

- Village
- Location within Botswana
- Coordinates: 21°13′S 26°9′E
- Country: Botswana
- District: Central District
- Elevation: 953 m (3,127 ft)

Population (2011)
  - Total: 1,792
- Time zone: GMT +2

Mosu is a village in Central District of Botswana. The village is located to the south of Sua Pan – the eastern half of Makgadikgadi Pan – and it has a primary school and a junior secondary school namely Mosu Primary School and Makgadikgadi Junior Secondary School respectively. The population was 1,792 in 2011 census. Mosu is also the gateway to Makgadikgadi plains. Village is located on the foot of a hilly landform, exposing the village's terrain to massive soil erosion.

Forest Conservation Botswana, through the village development committee has spearheaded efforts to reduce the soil erosion phenomenon affecting the village.

Mosu village is situated at around 56 km from Letlhakane village at -21.218181°S, 26.019335E° latitude/longitude decimal degrees.
