= Thune (surname) =

Thune is a surname.

It may refer to:

- Andreas Lauritz Thune (1848–1920), Norwegian engineer and businessman
- Gro Hillestad Thune (born 1943), Norwegian jurist and politician for the Labour Party
- Harald Thune (born 1952), Norwegian jurist, civil servant and elected official
- Jens Kristian Thune (1935–2018), Norwegian jurist
- John Thune (born 1961), Republican U.S. senator from the state of South Dakota and Senate Majority Leader
- John Thune (Norwegian politician) (born 1948), Norwegian politician for the Christian Democratic Party
- Nick Thune (born 1979), American actor, writer, guitarist and stand-up comedian
- Nils Thune (1898–1988), Norwegian politician for the Centre Party
- Nils Nilsen Thune (1880–1950), Norwegian jurist and civil servant
- Nils Trondsen Thune (1835–1879), Norwegian politician
- Vegard Thune (born 1951), Norwegian politician for the Conservative Party
- Wolfgang Thüne (born 1949), German gymnast
- Scott Thunes (born 1960), American rock bass guitarist
