= Sekgoma II =

Paramount Chief of the Bamangwato (1869–1925)

- King (Kgosi) of Bechuanaland, Ruler of the Bangwato people of central Botswana, Paramount Chief of the Bamangwato
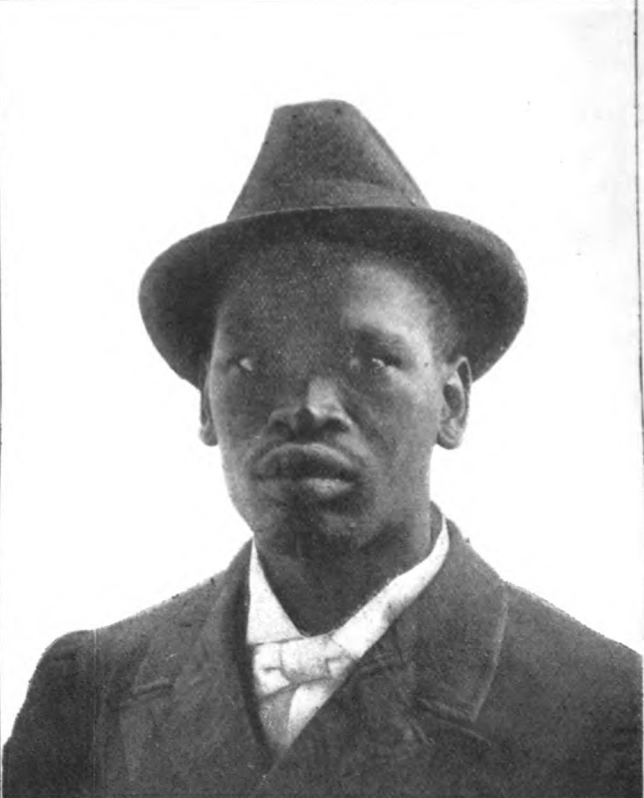
- Reign: 1923–1925
- Predecessor: Khama III
- Successor: Seretse II
- Born: 1869; Bechuanaland
- Died: 17 November 1925 (aged 55–56); Mafikeng
- Spouse: Tebogo Kebailele
- Issue: 3 sons and 1 daughter by 3 wives
Names
- Sekgoma II Khala
- House: Khama
- Father: Khama III (1872, 1875–1923)
- Mother: Elizabeth MmaBessie

Sekgoma (or Sekhome) II (1869 – November 17, 1925) was the king of the Bamangwato people of Bechuanaland in modern-day Botswana.

He was the son of King Khama III by his first wife, Mma-Besi. In 1923, Sekgoma II ascended the throne at the age of 54 upon the death of his father. However, his reign was short and only lasted two years, until his death in November 1925. Sekgoma's son, Seretse II, was too young at the time to ascend the throne, and Tshekedi Khama, Sekgoma's younger brother, acted as regent.
