= Lerala =

Village in Botswana

Coordinates: 22°47′05″S 27°45′40″E

Location of Lerala

Lerala is a village in Central District of Botswana. The village is located at the south-eastern end of the Tswapong Hills, 30 km (19 mi) from the Limpopo River and the border with South Africa and approximately 90 km (56 mi) east of Palapye. The population of Lerala was 6,871 in the 2011 census, which was a 20.5% increase from the 2001 population.
