= Royal Bafokeng Nation =

Tswana tribe of North West Province, South Africa

Bafokeng flag

Location of Bafokeng in North West, South Africa

The Royal Bafokeng is the ethnic homeland of the Bafokeng people, a Setswana-speaking traditional community. The monarchy covers 1,000 square kilometers (390 sq mi) in the North West Province of South Africa. The capital is Phokeng, near Rustenburg. "Bafokeng" is used to refer to both the tribal grouping as well as the land its members inhabit. The kingdom's current ruler is Kgosi (King) Leruo Molotlegi, who has reigned since 2000.

Bafokeng gained greater international attention in 2010, owing to its Royal Bafokeng Stadium, where six of the FIFA 2010 World Cup games were played, and the Bafokeng Sports Campus, which hosted the England football team during the World Cup.

== Background ==
The Bafokeng tribe (Bafokeng meaning 'People of the dew', or 'People of the grass') own a piece of land in South Africa's bushveld on which 150,000 people, not all ethnic Bafokeng, live. Oral tradition suggests that when they settled in the Rustenburg valley, it captured heavy overnight dew, holding the promise that the land would be fertile and hence that the community would prosper. The Bafokeng struggled to buy the land, repelling invaders and imperialists as they did so. It was Robert Moffat in 1829 who first recorded what is now Phokeng when he was on his way to visit Mzilikazi.

About 100–150,000 ethnic Bafokeng live in an area 150 km north-west of Johannesburg, South Africa, with the balance scattered primarily throughout South Africa. The Bafokeng have retained their unique cultural identity and traditional leadership structures and are led by a hereditary kgosi (king), currently Leruo Molotlegi.

== Geography ==
Much of the terrain is rolling grassland. Farming was the primary occupation until the discovery of the Merensky Reef in 1925, which led to mining. The Merensky Reef, a foot-thick layer of platinum-rich rock in the Bushveld Igneous Complex, is part of the richest platinum deposit in the world.

== History ==
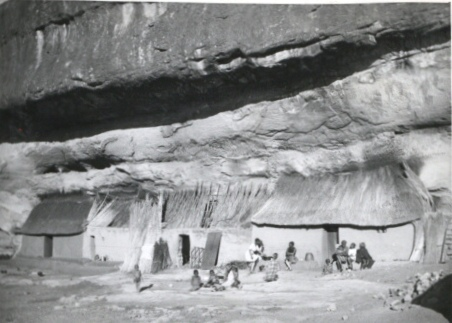
Bafokeng rock-shelter dwellings in Masoeling

The Bafokeng people trace their history back to the year 1140. Kgosi (King) Sekete III, who ruled in the early 1700s, was the first in the line of kings, of which the current Kgosi Leruo Molotlegi is the 15th direct descendant. Sekete III was followed by kings Diale, Ramorwa, Sekete IV, and Thethe. Then came arguably the most influential king in Bafokeng history: Kgosi August Mokgatle, who reigned from 1834 to 1891. Pooling community resources, he started buying back the land the Bafokeng had occupied for centuries from white colonialists. Thirty-three years after Mokgatle's death, a part of the reef containing the world's largest deposit of platinum group metals were discovered under Bafokeng land. Owing to Mokgatle's purchasing of the land, the Bafokeng were able to eventually (post apartheid) claim royalties from platinum mining industry mines within the nation.

Mokgwaro George Molotlegi (1936 to 1997) was the brother of Kgosi Edward Patrick Lebone Molotlegi who ruled the Bafokeng from 1988 to 1994. During his reign, South Africa's ruling National Party had created the Bophuthatswana government as the authority over all Batswana people, including the Bafokeng. Kgosi Lebone's opposition to the move brought him into conflict with the then Bophuthatswana president, Lucas Mangope, who detained the Bafokeng king and harassed him until he was forced to flee to neighbouring Botswana. Mangope then recognized Mokgwaro George Molotlegi as Kgosi of the Bafokeng. This situation prevailed until 1994 when Mangope was forced out of power when Bophuthatswana was reintegrated into South Africa. This enabled Kgosi Lebone to return to Phokeng and to once again lead his people. His return was marked by tumultuous celebrations, but they were short lived as Kgosi Lebone died in November 1995. The would-be Kgosi Mokgwaro George Molotlegi returned to his home in the area and remained there until his death in December 1997.

In 1925, the world's largest deposits of platinum group metals, such as platinum, rhodium and palladium were discovered on Bafokeng lands. Mining companies now pay royalties to the nation in exchange for the right to mine these metals. A court settlement in 1999 with Impala Platinum Mining (Implats), the second-largest platinum company in South Africa, gave the Royal Bafokeng Nation a 22 percent royalty on all platinum taken from their territory and an ownership stake in Implats. The value of the Bafokeng's stake in Impala had tripled to more than $50 million by 2001. The Bafokeng receive annual royalties of approximately $63 million from platinum mining.

== Politics ==
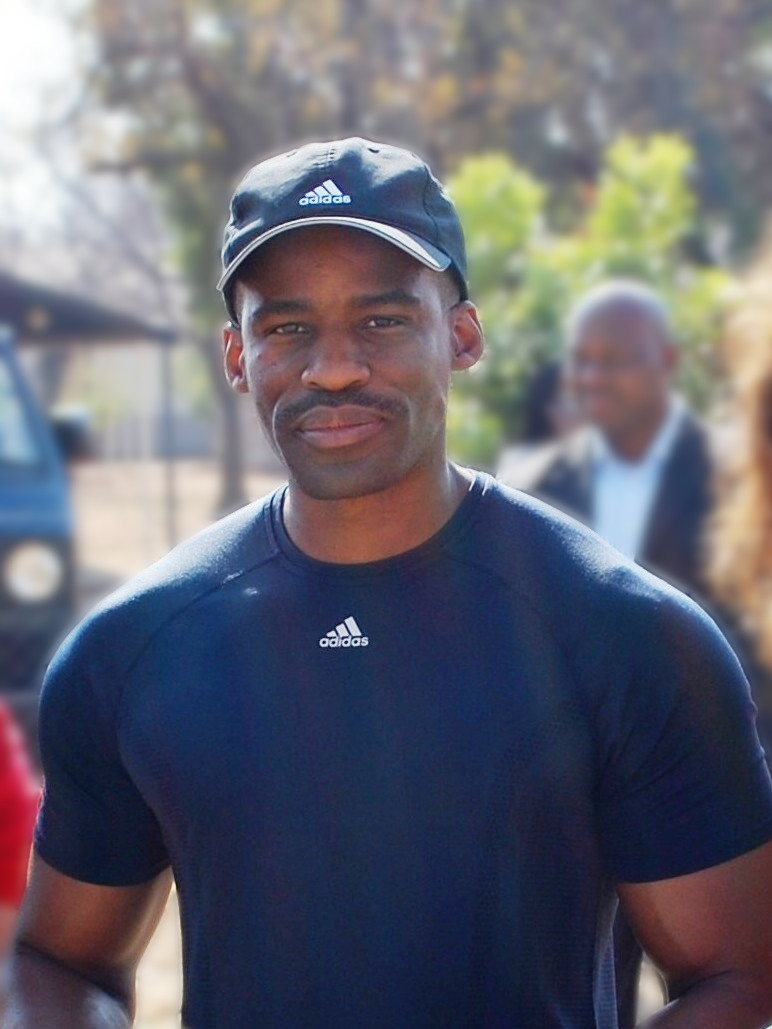
The king of the Bafokeng nation, Kgosi Leruo Tshekedi Molotlegi

Kgosi Leruo Tshekedi Moletlegi, the 36th recorded monarch of the Bafokeng people, was enthroned in August 2003. His predecessor was his elder brother, Lebone II. Kgosi Leruo Molotlegi is the 15th member of the current dynasty.

List of the most recent kings and their periods of reign:

- 1750-1834: Kgosi Tshukudu
- 1834–1891: Kgosi Mokgatle
- 1891–1896: Kgosi Tumagole
- 1897–1938: Kgosi Molotlegi
- 1938–1956: Kgosi Manotshe Molotlegi
- 1956–1995: Kgosi Lebone Edward Molotlegi
- 1995–2000: Kgosi Mollwane Molotlegi
- since 2000: Kgosi Leruo Molotlegi

== Economy ==
The royal house administers over 1,000 square kilometers of land. The nation has established a sovereign wealth fund, Royal Bafokeng Holdings, an investment entity in Johannesburg. The fund is responsible for overseeing the growth and maintenance of the community's income streams. It is considered to be Africa's most progressive community investment model, with total assets under management at approximately $4 billion. The RBN has invested royalties and dividends in a number of projects, and in civic administration and social services. These include:

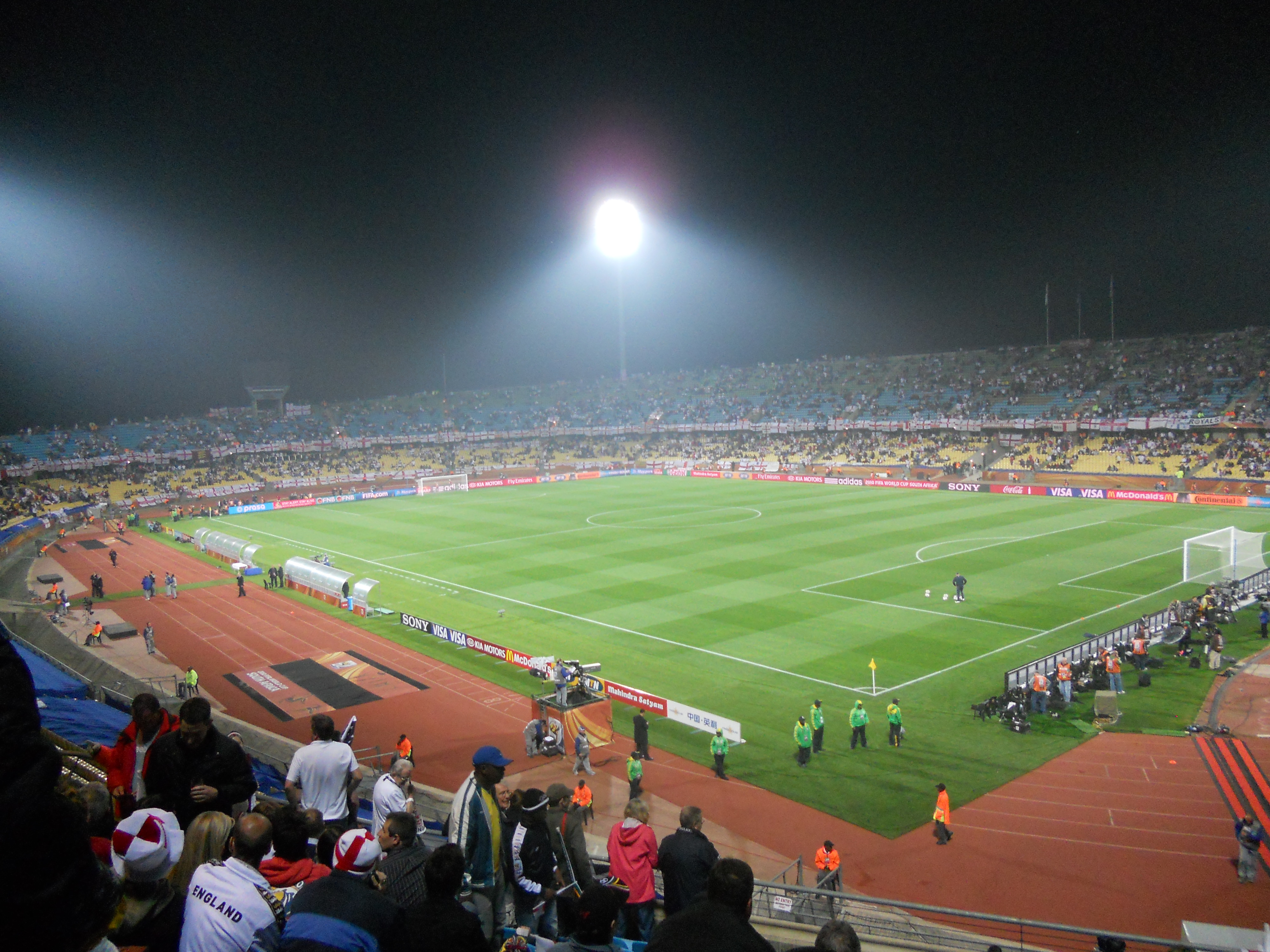
Royal Bafokeng Stadium, Phokeng

- Royal Bafokeng Sports, which is in charge of sport development among the residents of the area. A 45,000-seat stadium and athletic complex was built in Phokeng in 2000. The Royal Bafokeng Sports Palace was an official venue for the 2010 FIFA World Cup.
- Royal Bafokeng Administration (RBA), which is principally a town planning unit charged with service delivery and monitoring the progress of the Master Plan across all the regions. It looks after the various wards (kgotla) within the Nation to ensure that infrastructure and services are in line with the long-term vision.
- Royal Bafokeng Institute (RBI), whose goal is to improve education and learning in the Royal Bafokeng Nation.

RBN has also recruited several manufacturing companies to Phokeng as part of a drive to expand the nation's exports beyond raw materials and natural resources.

Before his enthronement, Kgosi Leruo Molotlegi set in motion the next phase in the development of his people. His brother, Kgosi Mollwane Lebone Boikanyo Molotlegi, paved the way for the initiative by proclaiming Vision 2020. This challenges the Bafokeng people to reduce their dependency on their diminishing mineral assets and to become a self-sufficient community within the first 20 years of this century, whilst also maintaining the Bafokeng culture.

The main areas of emphasis of Vision 2020 fall into the following areas:

- Investment diversification
- Economic Development
- Education Planning
- Infrastructure Development/Master Plan
- Health and Social Planning
- Crime Free Environment

== Totem ==
Most Setswana tribes, like other South African tribes, selected certain animals to symbolise the nation. The crocodile is the genealogical totem of the Basotho-Batswana people, who include the Bafokeng, and hence the Royal Bafokeng Nation. Thus the crocodile is an element in the RBN's flag. In the flag, the crocodile is moving towards water, which the Bafokeng people believe to be a sign of contentment. The crocodile is depicted by other Basotho-Batswana groups with its mouth open whereas the Bafokeng have always depicted their crocodile with its mouth shut.

The Bafokeng's motto is a e wele metsing (idiomatically translated as "let there be peace"). The Royal Bafokeng Nation praise idiom is “MaNape a Tshukudu E naka le nthla E tlhabang e itlhabela” (literally translated as "Nape the Rhino, with a sharp horn, that pierces as it pierces for itself"

== Art ==
South African expressionist painter Maggie Laubser (1886–1973) painted in 1945 the portrait Annie of the Royal Bafokeng.
