= Lepokole =

Coordinates: 21°47′41″S 28°20′58″E

Location of Lepokole

Lepokole is a village in Central District of Botswana. The village is located close to the border with Zimbabwe, and it has a primary school. The population was 505 in 2001 census.
