= Tsetsebjwe =

- Village
- Location within Botswana
- Coordinates: 22.415313°S 28.394753°E
- Country: Botswana
- District: Central District
- Sub-District: Bobirwa

Population (2001)
  - Total: 4,396

Tsetsebjwe is a village in the Bobirwa sub-district of the Central District of Botswana. It is in the Central Bobonong census district. As of 2001 it had a population of 4,396. The village is northwest of the privately owned Limpopo-Lipadi Game and Wilderness Reserve, near the South African border.

The nearest town is Selebi Phikwe.

== Origins ==
The village is named after the Tsetsebjwe hill, and lies at the foot of this hill.

== Economy ==
A 1983 survey of the Tsetsebjwe area found that there was no permanent surface water, although there was permanent water in the sand beds of most rivers. There were some small earth dams, but they were all dry. The village was supplied by boreholes. The nature of the basement terrain meant that there was not much potential for further groundwater development. The village holds many huge Mowana trees.

Many of the people are still engaged in cultivating the fields around the village and raising livestock.

The village is less than 50 kilometres (31 mi) from the Zanzibar Border Gate on the Limpopo River, an entry point to South Africa. Despite being an important point for transfer of goods between the two countries, the river is only crossed using a drift, and this is not usable in the rainy season. In 2008 the Tsetsebjwe Village Development Committee was calling for construction of a bridge over the river.

== Community ==
Tsetsebjwe hill was traditionally considered hallowed ground. It could be climbed by anyone as there is no danger or harm related to the hill. The summit was thought to be the grazing place for village goats and other livestock. It was used for fertility ceremonies and for ceremonies to appease the gods and end the dry season. These traditions are no longer followed to the same extent as in the past, and now there are pylons and communications towers on the hill.{klSadimbo}

The Eloyi Christian Church was founded in this village in 1955 by Poster Jakoba Keiphile. It has since spread across Botswana and into neighboring countries. At first, Jakobo suffered from religious persecution, since the only church allowed was that of the Congregationalist London Missionary Society. Freedom of religion was established after independence in 1966, and he was able to return to Tsetsebjwe. The village remains the headquarters of the church.

In August 2011 the community was in the news when a boy died at the Nyangabwe Referral Hospital in Francistown after being flogged. The cause apparently was a damaged kidney. the boy was sentenced to four cane strokes on the back by the traditional court, the Kgotla, for slapping a schoolmate during an argument. According to the headman of Mogadingwane ward, the boy's mother had preferred corporal punishment to a criminal charge from the police. The police and the Sub-Tribal Authority were in agreement that corporal punishment on a minor was not warranted by customary law.

Some prominent musicians have their origin in the village, including Kgwanyape, Marks and the Beat, and the Dinare traditional troupe.

== Political divisions ==
After a change in electoral boundaries, Tsetsejwe and the nearby village of Moletemane became part of the Tswapong North Constituency while remaining part of the Bobirwa sub-district. Authorities in Bobira have been trying to bring the villages back into the Bobirwa Constituency so that services can be delivered more efficiently. With the increased population, the Bobirwa Constituency would merit two Members of Parliament. During the 2014 general elections Tsetsebjwe went back to vote in Bobirwa.
