= Mathathane =

- Village
- Location within Botswana
- Coordinates: 22.268°S 28.750°E
- Country: Botswana
- District: Central District
- Sub-District: Bobirwa
- Time zone: UTC+2 (Central Africa Time)
  - Summer (DST): UTC+2 (not observed)

Mathathane is a village in Central District of Botswana. It is located in the eastern tip of Botswana, close to the border with South Africa. The population was 1,845 in 2001 census.
