= Bobonong =

Town in Botswana

- Town
- Location within Botswana
- Coordinates: 21.97043°S 28.423335°E
- Country: Botswana
- District: Central District
- Sub-District: Bobirwa
- Elevation: 728 m (2,388 ft)

Population (2022)
  - Total: 21,216
- Time zone: +2
- Climate: BSh

Bobonong is a town in the Central District of Botswana 80 km from Selibe Phikwe town. Bobonong has a population of around 19,000. The Babirwa tribe can be found in this town. The Botswana Pink semi-precious stones can be found in Bobonong region. The Babirwa are known for harvesting the mophane worm. The locals refer to the town as Bobcity or formerly Lekgarapeng, which was derived from the stoney landscape of the town.

Bobonong is the headquarters of the Bobirwa Sub District and is an hour's drive from the Tuli Block area where the Northern Tuli Game Reserve is located. Mashatu and Tuli Safari Lodge have accommodation for tourists.

Bobonong has a Senior Secondary School (Matshekge Hill School) which is a catchment for Junior Secondary Schools in the Bobirwa Sub District. It has government offices including a Magistrates office, a primary hospital, police station, post office, library and a small town center. It also has a large shopping complex, which include big retail stores such as Choppies Supermarket and Saverite Supermarket. Bobonong also have a chain of hardware stores, furniture shops and even wholesalers.

Bobonong can be accessed from Francistown through Selibi Phikwe or from Gaborone via Palapye both routes are tarred and branch off from the Main North South Highway which runs from Ramokgwebana to Ramatlabama.

It is a semi town with both traditional and modern housing structures with a reliable electricity supply as well as the standard ICT services including both land line and cellular services.

As a Sub District headquarters it has a cross sectional community and is served well by bus services from Tray Vrikeshor, Gaborone and other areas of Botswana.

The Lepokole Hills, a western prolongation of the Matobo Hills in Zimbabwe, are located 15 km north of Bobonong. The last of the San people in eastern Botswana lived in the hills and left more of their rock paintings in the caves and rocks. Stone Age tools and ancient pottery scattered around the hills are evidence of even earlier occupation.
