= Ngwato tribe =

Tswana chieftaincy of Botswana

The Bamangwato (more correctly BagammaNgwato, and also referred to as the BaNgwato or Ngwato) is one of the eight "principal" Tswana chieftaincies of Botswana. The modern Bamangwato formed in the Central Serowe, Palapye & Mahalapye District, with its main town and capital (after 1902) at Serowe. The paramount chief, a hereditary position, occupies one of the fifteen places in Ntlo ya Dikgosi, the national House of Chiefs.

== Origins ==
The core population of the Bamangwato are an 18th-century offshoot of the Bakwena people, but members in the Bamangwato kingdom came from many sources, as was the case with all of the major 19th-century African kingdoms. Sir Seretse Khama's paternal forebears, the chiefs of the Bamangwato, had built several prior capitals including Shoshong and Phalatswe, also known as Old Palapye. (Before the advent of colonial administration and fixed infrastructure, it was common for a tribal town to move when the local environment degraded.) Khama and the Protectorate administration created the modern borders of the Central District in Botswana.

== Language ==
The Sengwato language caused excitement in linguistic circles in 1998 when scholars realized that it contained a unique f-s sound.

== Chieftainship ==
Seretse Khama, Botswana's first president, was the Kgosi (king/chief) of the Bamangwato. His son, Ian Khama, was Botswana's fourth President and the tribe's de facto paramount chief.

== See also ==
- Rulers of Bangwato (bamaNgwato)
- Tswana
