= 1st Parliament of Botswana =

2nd Parliament	→

Overview
- Jurisdiction: Botswana
- Meeting place: Gaborone
- Term: 1966 – 1969
- Election: 1965 Bechuanaland general election
- Government: Botswana Democratic Party
- Opposition: Botswana People's Party

National Assembly
- Members: 31
- Speaker: Alfred Merriweather
- Deputy Speaker: Gaefalale Sebeso
- Party control: Botswana Democratic Party

The 1st Parliament of Botswana, composed of 31 members of the National Assembly, met in Gaborone from September 1966, when Botswana gained independence from the United Kingdom, to 1969. Its membership was set by the 1965 Bechuanaland general election, which gave the Botswana Democratic Party control of Parliament with 28 members, while the Botswana People's Party received the remaining three seats.

== List of members ==
The following is a list of members of the 1st Parliament of Botswana:

=== The Cabinet ===
Office	Name	Party
Prime Minister	Seretse Khama	Botswana Democratic Party
Deputy Prime Minister	Quett Masire	Botswana Democratic Party
Minister of Labour and Social Services	Archelaus Tsoebebe	Botswana Democratic Party
Minister of Works and Communications	David J. C. Morgan	Botswana Democratic Party
Minister of Agriculture	Moutlakgola P. K. Nwako	Botswana Democratic Party
Minister of Mines, Commerce, and Industry	Amos Dambe	Botswana Democratic Party
Minister of Local Government	Tsheko Tsheko	Botswana Democratic Party
Attorney General	Alan Tilbury	Botswana Democratic Party

=== Parliamentary leadership ===
Office	Name	Party
Speaker	Alfred Merriweather	Botswana Democratic Party
Deputy Speaker	Gaefalale Sebeso	Botswana Democratic Party
Parliamentary Secretaries, by Ministry
Agriculture	Ramsey D. Molefe	Botswana Democratic Party
Finance	Englishman Kgabo	Botswana Democratic Party
Labour and Social Services	Motlatsi Segokgo	Botswana Democratic Party

=== By constituency ===
Constituency	Name	Party
Speaker	Alfred Merriweather	Botswana Democratic Party
Attorney General	Alan Tilbury	Botswana Democratic Party
Bobirwa	Archelaus Tsoebebe	Botswana Democratic Party
Boteti	Benjamin Steinberg	Botswana Democratic Party
Francistown–Tati	Philip Matante	Botswana People's Party
Gaborone–Ramotswa	Norman Molomo	Botswana Democratic Party
Ghanzi	Ntwakgolo Sekga	Botswana Democratic Party
Kanye North	Basenyapelo Chibana	Botswana Democratic Party
Kanye South	Quett Masire	Botswana Democratic Party
Kgalagadi	Boy Moapare	Botswana Democratic Party
Kgatleng–Tlokweng	Motlatsi Segokgo	Botswana Democratic Party
Kweneng South	Johnson Nkoane	Botswana Democratic Party
Kweneng West	Eyes Reokwaeng	Botswana Democratic Party
Mahalapye	Gaolese Koma	Botswana Democratic Party
Maun–Chobe	Dikgothi Monwela	Botswana Democratic Party
Mmadinare	Amos Dambe	Botswana Democratic Party
Mochudi	Thari Motlhagodi	Botswana People's Party
Molepolole	Stephen Thobega	Botswana Democratic Party
Molepolole East	Englishman Kgabo	Botswana Democratic Party
Moshupa	Edison Masisi	Botswana Democratic Party
Ngami	Gaerolwe Kwerepe	Botswana Democratic Party
Ngwaketse–Kgalagadi	Pulafela Sebotho	Botswana Democratic Party
Nkange	Obed Chilume	Botswana Democratic Party
Okavango	Tsheko Tsheko	Botswana Democratic Party
Sebina–Gweta	Mudongo Maswikiti	Botswana Democratic Party
Serowe North	Seretse Khama	Botswana Democratic Party
Serowe South	Bakwena Kgari	Botswana Democratic Party
Shoshong	Goareng Mosinyi	Botswana Democratic Party
Tati West	Kenneth Nkhwa	Botswana People's Party
Tonota	Lemme Makgekgenene	Botswana Democratic Party
Tswapong North	Moutlakgola P. K. Nwako	Botswana Democratic Party
Tswapong South	Gaefalale Sebeso	Botswana Democratic Party
Specially elected	James G. Haskins	Botswana Democratic Party
Specially elected	Ramsey D. Molefe	Botswana Democratic Party
Specially elected	David J. C. Morgan	Botswana Democratic Party
Specially elected	George W. Sim	Botswana Democratic Party

== See also ==
- Elections in Botswana
