= 2nd Parliament of Botswana =

1969–1974 legislative meeting

The 2nd Parliament of Botswana was the meeting of the National Assembly of Botswana from 1969 to 1974. It had thirty one standard members, four specially elected members, and two ex officio members. Its members were chosen in the 1974 Botswana general election.

== Members ==
The following members were elected during the 1969 Botswana general election.

Constituency	Member	Party
President	Seretse Khama	Botswana Democratic Party
Speaker	Albert Frank Lock	Botswana Democratic Party
Bobirwa	Abel C. Sikunyane	Botswana Democratic Party
Lobatse/Barolong	Benjamin C. Thema	Botswana Democratic Party
Boteti	Benjamin Steinberg	Botswana Democratic Party
Francistown/Tati East	Philip Matante	Botswana People's Party
Gaborone/Ramotswa	Welly M. Seboni	Botswana Democratic Party
Ghanzi	Henry Jankie	Botswana Democratic Party
Kanye North	Motsokwane N. Yane	Botswana National Front
Kanye South	Bathoen Gaseitsiwe	Botswana National Front
Kgalagadi	Boy M. Moapare	Botswana Democratic Party
Kgatleng/Tlokweng	Motlatsi K. Segokgo	Botswana Democratic Party
Kweneng South	Johnson O. M. Nkoane	Botswana Democratic Party
Kweneng West	Eyes G. Reokwaeng	Botswana Democratic Party
Mahalapye	Gaolese Kent Koma	Botswana Democratic Party
Maun/Chobe	Dikgothi R. Mongwela	Botswana Democratic Party
Mmadinare	Amos M. Dambe	Botswana Democratic Party
Mochudi	Thari W. Motlhagodi	Botswana People's Party
Molepolole North	Daniel Kwelagobe	Botswana Democratic Party
Molepolole East	Englishman Kgabo	Botswana Democratic Party
Moshopa	Edison Masisi	Botswana Democratic Party
Ngami	Gaerolwe Mesho Kwerepe	Botswana Democratic Party
Ngwaketse/Kgalagadi	Patrick N. Tshane	Botswana National Front
Nkange	Obed I. Chilume	Botswana Democratic Party
Tati West	Kenneth Moesi Nkhwa	Botswana People's Party
Okavango	Motsamai Mpho	Botswana Independence Party
Sebina/Gweta	Mudongo Maswikiti	Botswana Democratic Party
Serowe North	Seretse Khama	Botswana Democratic Party
Serowe South	Bakwena K. Kgari	Botswana Democratic Party
Shoshong	Goareng S. Mosinyi	Botswana Democratic Party
Tonota	Lemme Makgekgenene	Botswana Democratic Party
Tswapong North	Moutlakgola P.K. Nwako	Botswana Democratic Party
Tswapong South	Gaefalale G. Sebeso	Botswana Democratic Party
Specially elected	Quett Masire	
Specially elected	James Haskins	
Specially elected	Tsheko Tsheko	
Specially elected	Kebatlamang Morake	
