= Tswapong South =

Parliamentary constituency in the Central District of Botswana, 1965 onwards

- Single-member constituency for the National Assembly
- District: Central District
- Population: 31,771
- Major settlements: Sefhare; Ramokgonami
- Area: 4,271 km^{2}

Current constituency
- Created: 1965
- Party: BCP
- MP: Kesitegile Gobotswang
- Margin of victory: 1,626 (10.4 pp)

Tswapong South is a constituency in the Central District represented in the National Assembly of Botswana by Kesitegile Gobotswang, a BCP MP since 2019.

== Constituency profile ==
Situated in the southeast of the Central District of Botswana, the Tswapong South constituency was established in 1965 for the country's inaugural elections and is one of Botswana's longest extant constituencies.

Reflecting the dominant Tswapong population which has largely assimilated with the Ngwato tribe, the constituency was historically a Botswana Democratic Party (BDP) stronghold. From 1965 to 2014, the BDP consistently garnered an average of 80% of the vote. However, the BDP's dominance began to wane, with its vote share decreasing in each election since 1984, barring the exception of the 2014 election. The constituency was subject to modest boundary changes and was briefly renamed to Sefhare-Ramokgonami in the run-up to the 2014 general election.

In 2019, echoing a broader trend within the district, a significant political realignment occurred as Ian Khama, paramount chief of the Ngwato tribe fell out with the incumbent president, Mokgweetsi Masisi and leader of the BDP. This political discord impacted the constituency's voting patterns. Khama campaigned for the Umbrella for Democratic Change (UDC)'s parliamentary candidate, Kesitegile Gobotswang during the 2019 election campaign.

The 2019 election saw a massive 18 percentage point swing against the BDP, marking the first time the BDP lost the constituency, ending the party’s 53-year grip on the constituency. Posterior to the exit of the BCP from the UDC, incumbent MP Gobotswang retained the seat at the 2024 Botswana general election, under the BCP banner.

The constituency, predominantly rural, encompasses the following villages:

1. Sefhare
2. Mhalapitsa
3. Maape
4. Ramokgonami
5. Seleka
6. Ngwapa
7. Mokobeng
8. Moshopha
9. Chadibe
10. Matlhako
11. Machaneng
12. Pilikwe
13. Letoreng
14. Sherwood Farms
15. Martin's Drift Border Post

== Members of Parliament ==
Key: BDP UDC BCP

Election	Winner
1965 election	Gaefalale Sebeso
1969 election	Gaefalale Sebeso
1974 election	Gaefalale Sebeso
1979 election	Gaefalale Sebeso
1984 election	Gaefalale Sebeso
1989 election	Pelokgale Selema
1994 election	Pelokgale Selema
1999 election	Pelokgale Selema
2004 election	Oreeditse Molebatsi
2009 election	Oreeditse Molebatsi
2014 election	Dorcas Makgato
2019 election	Kesitegile Gobotswang
2024 election	Kesitegile Gobotswang

== Election results ==
=== 2024 election ===
General election 2024: Tswapong South
Party	Candidate	Votes	%	±%
BCP	Kesitegile Gobotswang	5,998	38.22	N/A
UDC	Shadrack Baaitse	4,372	27.86	−34.82
BDP	Dorcas Makgato	4,050	25.81	−11.51
BPF	Segaetsho Garekwe	970	6.18	N/A
Margin of victory		1,626	10.36	N/A
Total valid votes		15,693	98.79	−0.24
Rejected ballots		192	1.21	+0.24
Turnout		15,885	85.33	−1.59
Registered electors		18,615		
BCP hold		Swing	N/A	

=== 2019 election ===
General election 2019: Sefhare-Ramokgonami
Party	Candidate	Votes	%	±%
UDC	Kesitegile Gobotswang	9,341	62.68	+18.49
BDP	Dorcas Makgato	5,562	37.32	−18.49
Margin of victory		3,779	25.36	N/A
Total valid votes		14,903	99.03	+1.50
Rejected ballots		146	0.97	−1.50
Turnout		15,049	86.92	+1.26
Registered electors		17,314		
UDC gain from BDP		Swing	+18.49	

=== 2014 election ===
General election 2014: Sefhare-Ramokgonami
Party	Candidate	Votes	%	±%
BDP	Dorcas Makgato	7,459	55.81	+4.53
BCP	Kesitegile Gobotswang	5,907	44.19	+2.89
Margin of victory		1,552	11.62	+1.64
Total valid votes		13,366	97.53	0.00
Rejected ballots		339	2.47	0.00
Turnout		13,705	85.66	+10.05
Registered electors		16,000		
BDP hold		Swing	+3.71	

=== 2009 election ===
General election 2009: Tswapong South
Party	Candidate	Votes	%	±%
BDP	Oreeditse Molebatsi	5,183	51.28	−12.45
BCP	Kesitegile Gobotswang	4,175	41.30	+16.09
BNF	Terone Koobonye	750	7.42	−3.64
Margin of victory		1,008	9.98	−28.54
Total valid votes		10,108	97.53	+0.07
Rejected ballots		256	2.47	−0.07
Turnout		10,364	75.61	−3.04
Registered electors		13,707		
BDP hold		Swing	−14.27	

=== 2004 election ===
General election 2004: Tswapong South
Party	Candidate	Votes	%	±%
BDP	Oreeditse Molebatsi	5,005	63.73	−7.88
BCP	Kesitegile Gobotswang	1,980	25.21	+19.52
BNF	Obonetse Menyatso	869	11.06	−11.64
Margin of victory		3,025	38.52	−10.39
Total valid votes		7,854	97.46	+2.92
Rejected ballots		205	1.94	−2.92
Turnout		8,059	78.65	+3.46
Registered electors		10,247		
BDP hold		Swing	−5.20	

=== 1999 election ===
General election 1999: Tswapong South
Party	Candidate	Votes	%	±%
BDP	Pelokgale Selema	5,891	71.61	−4.45
BNF	L.P. Seema	1,867	22.70	−1.24
BCP	G. Modise	468	5.69	N/A
Margin of victory		4,024	48.91	−3.21
Total valid votes		8,226	94.54	N/A
Rejected ballots		475	5.46	N/A
Turnout		8,701	75.19	−3.52
Registered electors		11,572		
BDP hold		Swing	−1.61	

=== 1994 election ===
General election 1994: Tswapong South
Party	Candidate	Votes	%	±%
BDP	Pelokgale Selema	6,033	76.06	−15.97
BNF	G. Modise	1,899	23.94	+15.97
Margin of victory		4,134	52.12	−31.94
Turnout		7,932	78.71	+8.14
Registered electors		10,077		
BDP hold		Swing	−15.97	

=== 1989 election ===
General election 1989: Tswapong South
Party	Candidate	Votes	%	±%
BDP	Pelokgale Selema	6,130	92.03	−2.87
BNF	Obonetse Menyatso	531	7.97	+2.87
Margin of victory		5,599	84.06	−5.74
Turnout		6,661	70.57	−5.12
Registered electors		9,439		
BDP hold		Swing	−2.87	

=== 1984 election ===
General election 1984: Tswapong South
Party	Candidate	Votes	%	±%
BDP	Gaefalale Sebeso	5,358	94.90	−2.87
BNF	Obonetse Menyatso	288	5.10	+2.87
Margin of victory		5,070	89.80	−5.74
Turnout		5,646	75.69	+9.59
Registered electors		7,459		
BDP hold		Swing	−2.87	

=== 1979 election ===
General election 1979: Tswapong South
Party	Candidate	Votes	%	±%
BDP	Gaefalale Sebeso	5,223	97.77	+2.18
BNF	D. Ontumetse	119	2.23	N/A
Margin of victory		5,104	95.54	+4.36
Turnout		5,342	66.10	+33.92
Registered electors		8,802		
BDP hold		Swing	+2.18	

=== 1974 election ===
General election 1974: Tswapong South
Party	Candidate	Votes	%	±%
BDP	Gaefalale Sebeso	2,560	95.59	−0.81
Independent	Obonetse Menyatso	118	4.41	N/A
Margin of victory		2,442	91.18	−1.62
Turnout		2,678	32.18	−25.00
Registered electors		8,322		
BDP hold		Swing	−0.81	

=== 1969 election ===
General election 1969: Tswapong South
Party	Candidate	Votes	%	±%
BDP	Gaefalale Sebeso	2,998	96.40	+1.73
BNF	Obonetse Menyatso	112	3.60	N/A
Margin of victory		2,886	92.80	+2.37
Turnout		3,110	57.18	−28.4
Registered electors		5,439		
BDP hold		Swing	+1.19	

=== 1965 election ===
General election 1965: Tswapong South
Party	Candidate	Votes	%
BDP	Gaefalale Sebeso	5,118	94.67
BIP	D.T. Koloi	229	4.24
BPP	P. Pudiepatshwa	59	1.09
Margin of victory		4,889	90.43
Turnout		5,406	~85.6
Registered electors		N/A	
BDP win (new seat)			
