= Gaolese Kent Koma =

Botswanan politician and businessman

Personal details
- Born: 7 December 1918 Shoshong
- Died: 9 March 2006 (aged 87)
- Education: Khama Memorial School, Endeleni High Institute at Pietermaritzburg
- Profession: Botswana politician, statesman, and businessman.

Gaolese Kent Koma (7 December 1918 – 9 March 2006) was a Botswana politician and businessman. He served in the National Assembly as Member of Parliament for Mahalapye village from 1965 to 1994.

== Early life and education ==
He was born on 7 December 1918 in Shoshong and later moved with his parents to settle in Ditlharepeng ward in Serowe village in the Central District of Botswana. His father Nkgabong Dintwe was farmer and headman. His mother Gabataelwe Dintwe Koma was a house wife who spent much of her time in the fields. Koma is the last born of four siblings, three boys and a girl. He was member of the Malekantwa age regiment (known as mophato) which had people from his generation such as Moutlakgola P.K. Nwako, Lenyeletse Seretse, Kenneth Koma and Monametsi Chiepe. As young boy, Koma spent much time at the cattle post helping in rearing of cattle and other livestock. He started his school at Central School in 1930 at the age of 12 then proceeded to Khama Memorial School. In the early 1940s went to study his secondary education as it was norm during this period in the then apartheid South Africa. He studied accounts and commerce at Endeleni High Institute at Pietermaritzburg in the KwaZulu Natal province. He started to work for a bank in 1949 in Cape Town. In the fall of 1951 he returned home to Mahalapye to start family business which was named Koma brothers. This was the supermarket he opened with his brothers and cousins aimed at giving local residents credit at lower rates. One of the shareholders of this enterprise was Kenneth Koma.

He married Mable Pinnie Koma (born Mpa) (1924–2008) in October 1953 in Mahikeng, South Africa whom he had been introduced to by Kenneth Koma in Moeng College in the north eastern Botswana. Mable Pinnie Mpa was a nurse at the time at Moeng College.

== Politics ==
He joined politics in 1955 and sitting in the first meeting that founded Botswana Democratic Party (then called Bechuanaland Democratic Party) with Seretse Khama, Goareng Mosinyi, Lenyeletse Seretse, Moutlakgola P.K. Nwako, Quett Masire and others. Initially his cousin and relative Kenneth Koma tried to lure him to start their own party to be known as Botswana National Front and declined the offer He found friendship in Quett Masire, the second president of Botswana to an extent that his cousin married Masire' s sister. The closest friend in many was Lemme Makgekgenene, former Member of Parliament for Tonota. They shared many political views and visions for Botswana. He became the first Member of Parliament for Mahalapye immediately after independence in 1965. Moreover, he held the position of BDP's central district chairperson from 1965 until 1985. He sat in many Parliament committees such as the treasury, local government review and others. He travelled to different countries on official business to United States of America (New Mexico, Nevada and Florida), Austria and many towns in the United Kingdom. Koma mentored and introduced many future cadres of BDP among them the current Botswana Democratic Party chairman, Daniel Kwelagobe whom he revered to calling his nephew and Assistant Minister of Local Government and Rural Development, Botlogile Tshireletso. He retired from politics in 1994 and succeeded by Foreign Affairs Minister Mompati Merafhe. Koma favoured Anna Lesolle to take over from him but she faced stiff competition from new arrival in the form of Mompati Merafhe.

== Later life ==
During his final days Koma fought stroke that hit him in 1997 and he displayed a fighting spirit that he carried all his life until he gave up the battle in 2006. He remained a prominent cattle farmer and cultivator until his death on 9 March 2006 from a stroke.

He is credited with developing Mahalapye from a remote village to a semi town in 1994. By building infrastructure, roads and creating opportunities for small farmers in the region to access market. He founded a private primary school with his wife called Montsamaisa Primary School in Mahalapye that enrolled many young people who failed primary schooling but couldn't return to school. In BDP he has been viewed as one of the generation that served the party selflessly without expecting recognition for their efforts. Playing a part from its formation to grass roots enrollment of new members and campaigning in the then poverty-stricken Botswana until he left public life in 1997.
