= Kgabo =

Kgabo may refer to:

- Larona Kgabo, (born 1986) a Botswana model and beauty pageant titleholder
- Kgabo Commission, a 1991 Botswana commission of inquiry
  - Kgabo Report, the findings of the Kgabo Commission
- Kgabo II, kgosi of the Kwena tribe
- Englishman Kgabo, (1925–1992) a Motswana politician
- Gaolatlhe Kgabo, South African politician
