= Botswana–Japan relations =

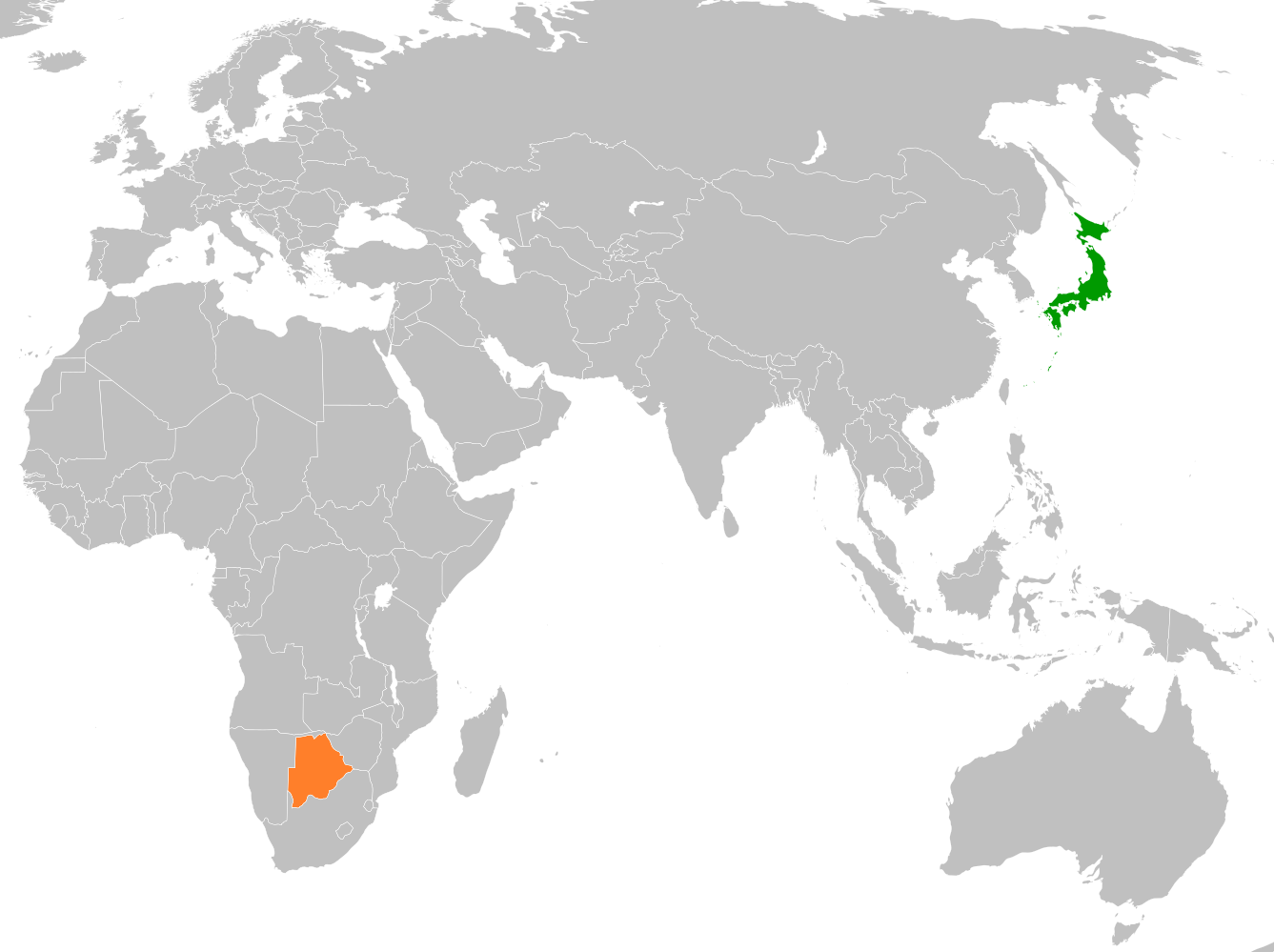
- Japan: Botswana

Botswana and Japan established bilateral relations upon Botswana's independence in 1966. Botswana established its diplomatic mission in Tokyo in 1997, and Japan opened an embassy in Gaborone in 2008. The two nations have been regular trading partners, and Japan has provided aid to Botswana to fund education and infrastructure.

== History ==
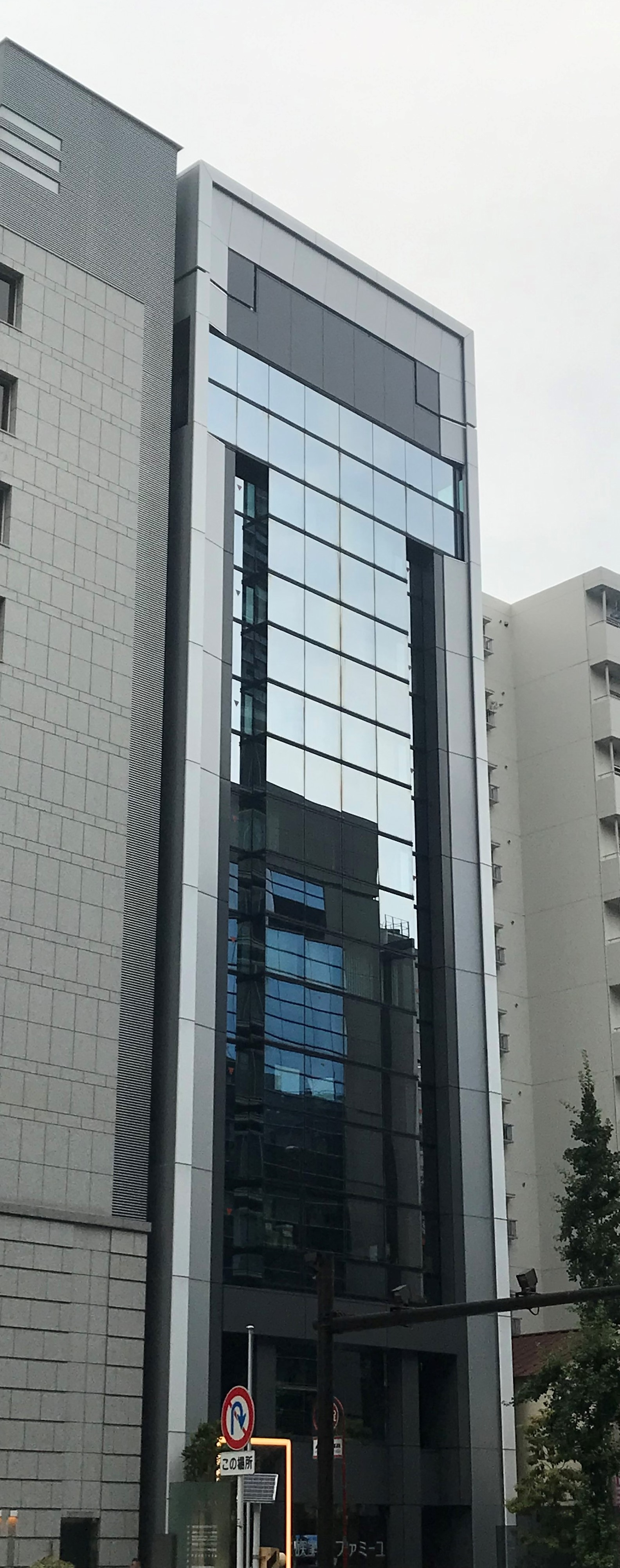
The EDGE Shiba Yonchome Building in Shiba, Tokyo; the sixth floor houses the Embassy of Botswana.

Although Japan had developed relations with most territories in southern Africa by the 1920s, it did not do so with colonial Botswana. Botswana and Japan established relations upon Botswana's independence in September 1966, and Japan was one of many nations to send aid to the newly founded nation. Leadership in Botswana saw a potential model in Japan, which had grown to become the second largest economy in the world despite geographic isolation. Japan established a non-resident ambassador to Botswana in 1971 through the ambassador to Zambia, where it was one of several countries to do so.

1981 marked the first development program between the two nations when Japan funded laboratory equipment for schools in Botswana, and the first Japanese loan to Botswana was issued in 1986 to fund the Morupule Thermal Power Station. Further loans were issued in the following years for the Railway Rolling Stock Increase Project in 1988, the Trans-Kgalagadi Road Project in 1991, and the North-South Carrier pipeline in 1995.

Botswana had a non-resident ambassador for Japan through China until it established a diplomatic mission in Tokyo in 1997, which in turn facilitated non-resident service for the Philippines and Thailand. Oteng Jenamo Tebape was appointed as the first ambassador to Japan. Japan had a non-resident ambassador for Botswana through South Africa until it established an embassy in Gaborone in 2008, which doubled as Japan's embassy for the Southern African Development Community. Ryoichi Matsuyama was appointed as the first ambassador to Botswana. After the embassy opened, a group of 50 Japanese politicians and businessmen arrived to meet and negotiate with their Batswana counterparts. That July, the state-owned Japan Oil, Gas and Metals National Corporation opened a Geological Remote Sensing Centre in Lobatse.

While visiting Botswana as part of a delegation in 2009, former Japanese prime minister Yasuo Fukuda used his status to propose aid from Japan for the primary hospital in Thamaga. Japan provided US$80,000 the following year so the hospital could build a tuberculosis centre. Botswana gave one million pula (US$148,000) in aid to victims of the 2011 Tōhoku earthquake and tsunami, and Japan issued a loan to Botswana to fund the Kazungula Bridge in 2012. In 2013, Botswana became the first country to adopt Japan's ISDB broadcasting standard. Japan provided US$92,709 to Botswana in 2015 to provide special education at Masupe Primary School in Maunatlala.

== Economy and politics ==
Trade between Botswana and Japan focuses on natural resources. Japan has no significant natural resources while Botswana has a large supply, and Botswana's economy is dependent on their sale. As of 2015, Japan's exports to Botswana totalled US$3.3 billion, with automobiles and semiconductors being the most common products. Botswana's exports to Japan totalled US$1.8 billion, largely consisting of diamonds. According to Japanese ambassador Hoshiyama Takashi, Japan sent 35.7 billion yen in aid to Botswana between 1966 and 2021. Several Japanese companies have operated in Botswana, including Komatsu Limited, which provided trucks for Debswana.

Botswana has been a regular ally of Japan in the United Nations and has supported Japan's bid for permanent membership in the United Nations Security Council. Because of Botswana's political stability, Japan has expressed a preference for it over other nations in the region. Several students from Botswana have been admitted to Japan through the Monbukagakusho Scholarship. One student was selected each year until 2009, when the number was increased to two students annually.

== Official visits ==
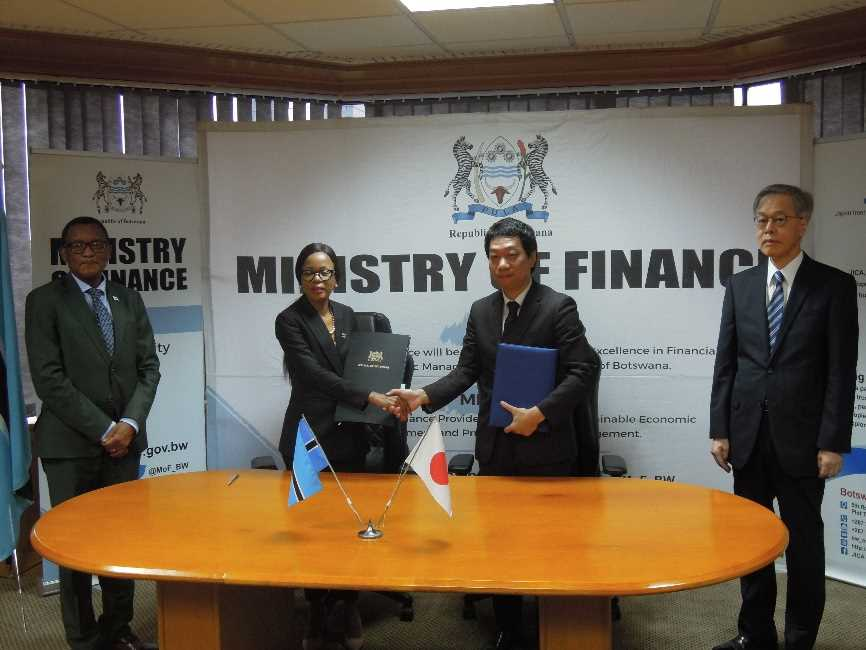
Botswana Minister of Finance Peggy Serame and JICA representative Okada Kaoru during COVID-19 pandemic relief negotiations in 2023

Motsamai Mpho, an anti-Apartheid activist and founder of the Botswana People's Party, visited Japan in 1964 to attend a World Peace Council conference. He said that he was the first person from Botswana to visit Japan and that he "acted as a goodwill ambassador for the nation". Botswana's first president, Seretse Khama, never made an official visit to Japan. Quett Masire, president of Botswana, made several visits to Japan in the 1990s. These included his attendance at the Taiso-no-Rei funeral ceremony for Japanese Emperor Hirohito in 1990 and as one of five African heads of state at the launch of the Tokyo International Conference on African Development (TICAD) in 1993. The Minister for Foreign Affairs of Japan Shozo Azuma visited Botswana in 1994, and Minister of Foreign Affairs of Botswana Mompati Merafhe visited Japan in 1996.

As he had previously worked as an executive director for the International Monetary Fund, President Festus Mogae of Botswana was chosen to chair an economic session of the second TICAD in 1998. He returned to Japan in 2003 to meet with Prime Minister Junichiro Koizumi. Four members of the National Diet of Japan visited Botswana in 2004, led by Japan–Botswana Parliamentary Friendship League president Tadahiro Matsushita. Vice President of Botswana Ian Khama was invited to Japan in 2005, where he met with Emperor Akihito and the Japanese Minister of Foreign Affairs, among others. In 2006, Mogae attended the Botswana Week celebration organised by the Botswana Embassy in Tokyo to celebrate the 40th anniversary of Botswana's independence. This coincided with a meeting between Mogae and Koizumi as well as the launch of a tourism campaign in Botswana with the Japanese actress Rei Kikukawa as a spokeswoman. Akira Amari, the Japanese Minister of Economy, Trade and Industry, visited Botswana in 2007. Japanese Minister for Foreign Affairs Hirofumi Nakasone led a delegation to Botswana when the nation hosted a conference evaluating Japan's fourth TICAD in 2009. Ian Khama visited Japan in 2010 as president of Botswana.

2013 saw many visits between Botswana and Japan, which the Japanese ambassador to Botswana called "unprecedented". Japanese visitors to Botswana included Vice Minister of Foreign Affairs Masaji Matsuyama and Vice Minister of Internal Affairs and Communications Keiichiro Tachibana. Ian Khama met with Japanese Prime Minister Shinzo Abe during the fifth TICAD, with a delegation that included ministers Dorcas Makgato-Malesu, Mokgweetsi Masisi, and Kitso Mokaila. Botswana's Minister of Transport and Communications, Nonofo Molefhi, visited that November to discuss broadcasting regulation.

== See also ==
- Foreign relations of Botswana
- Foreign relations of Japan
