= History of the Jews in Botswana =

Botswanan Jews
Total population
- 21

Regions with significant populations
- Gaborone

Languages
- English

Religion
- Judaism

The history of the Jews in Botswana is relatively modern and centered in the city of Gaborone. Most Jews in Botswana are Israelis and South Africans.

== History ==
In 1938, with the rise of Nazism in Europe, the colonial authorities in Botswana then known as Bechuanaland, South Africa, and Great Britain attempted to resettle some Jewish refugees in Botswana to leverage their capital and agricultural skills to help improve the territory's struggling economy. However, the outbreak of the Second World War in 1939 abruptly ended these efforts.

In 1994, the Botswana Jewish community drafted a constitution and created its first committee. Rabbi Moshe Silberhaft, spiritual leader to the African Jewish Congress, made a special visit to Gaborone to participate in the meeting where it was decided to call the community the Jewish Community of Botswana.

In 2003, the Jewish community in Botswana appealed to local authorities to remain vigilant against terrorism, in line with President Festus Mogae's "zero tolerance" stance on crime. This initiative is supported by the African Jewish Congress, which assists Botswana's Jewish population in maintaining protective measures amid global concerns about anti-Semitic and terror-related threats.

As of 2020, an estimated 21-100 Jews lived in Botswana, with almost all living in Gaborone. The community is predominantly Israeli Jews working in agriculture, business, and industry.

== Religious practice ==
No synagogues exist in Botswana. During major religious holidays and times of prayer, the African Jewish Congress and the South African Jewish Board of Deputies assist visiting Jews. Religious services for Shabbat and the Jewish holidays are held in private homes with Kosher meals provided. Jews in Botswana are buried in non-Jewish cemeteries, as there is no Jewish cemetery in the country. Kosher food is delivered through the South African Jewish Board of Deputies.

== Botswana–Israel relations ==
Botswana and Israel established diplomatic relations in 1972. Botswana renewed diplomatic recognition of Israel in 1993.

In 2012, six Israeli companies employed over 1,000 Batswana citizens to cut and polish diamonds.

In 2012, Ben Gurion University (BGU) agreed to facilitate a new institution called the Botswana International University of Science and Technology. BGU will be in charge of teaching and building the university's research capacity. Students from Botswana will also be invited to Israel to complete their studies before returning to build the staff of the university. According to Israeli ambassador Dan Shaham: "Some 250 students will be selected to begin their studies in the coming months. More and more students and more and more subjects will be added gradually, until it becomes a real university."

In May 2021, the Baruch Padeh Medical Center sent a delegation of Israeli doctors to assist Botswana during the COVID-19 pandemic. The Israeli delegation partnered with the Sir Ketumile Masire Teaching Hospital in Gaborone.

As of June 2021, Ofra Farhi serves as the non-resident Israeli ambassador to Botswana, Namibia, Zambia, and Zimbabwe.

== Notable individuals ==
- Benjamin Steinberg, a Botswanan cattle rancher and politician who was the first Treasurer of the Botswana Democratic Party and the first white Motswana Member of Parliament in 1965

== See also ==
- History of the Jews in Africa

=== Regions ===
- History of the Jews in Central Africa
- History of the Jews in East Africa
- History of the Jews in North Africa
- History of the Jews in Southern Africa
- History of the Jews in West Africa

=== Topics ===
- Freedom of religion in Botswana
