= Minister of Transport and Communications =

Minister of Transport and Communications (sometimes Minister of Transportation and Communications) may refer to:

- Minister of Transport and Communications (Botswana)
- Minister of Transport and Communications (Finland)
- Minister of Transport and Communications (Greece)
- Minister of Transport and Communications (Norway)
- Minister of Transport and Communications (Canada), see Department of transportation
- Minister of Transportation and Communications (Peru)
