= Mable Pinnie Koma =

Motswana politician, NGO activist and women leader

Mable Pinnie Khutsafalo Koma

Councillor for Mahalapye ward of Dilaene
- In office 1984–1994

Chairperson of Central District Council
- In office 1982–1990

Personal details
- Born: 6 August 1924 Mahikeng a Mmamosetsanyana, North West Province, Bophuthatswana, South Africa.
- Died: 22 August 2008 (aged 84)
- Party: Botswana Democratic Party
- Education: St Mary's in Mahikeng; Holly Cross Mission in Alexandra, Gauteng; Conrad Hospital in Taung, Vryburg

Mable (also spelled Mabel) Pinnie Khutsafalo Koma (1924–2008) (born Mpa) was a former Botswana politician, woman's organization leader, and businesswoman.

She served as Councillor for Mahalapye ward of Dilaene from 1984 to 1994. Koma was Chairperson of the Central District Council from 1982 to 1990. She was the Botswana Democratic Party (BDP) women's wing founding member and chairperson in mid 70's. Founding member of Botswana's Young Women's Christian Association.

== Early life and education ==
Mable Pinnie Koma was born on 6 August 1924 in Mahikeng a Mmamosetsanyana, North West Province, then known as Bophuthatswana, South Africa. She was the third child out of ten. Her parents were Pitoro and Bela Mpa. She resided in an area known as Tlhabologo-Magogwe where she grew up with her grandparents. She started her schooling at St Mary's (also known as Roma) in Mahikeng where she finished her primary studies. She then proceeded to Holly Cross Mission in Alexandra, Gauteng before going to do her nursing studies at Conrad Hospital in Taung, Vryburg where she also began her career as a nurse. After her studies, she came back to Mahikeng to practice as a nurse at Mahikeng Clinic.

== Career and politics ==
In 1948 an opening came from Moeng College for a matron, a position she took until 1955. She then went on transfer to Serowe Teachers Training College in 1955 and later was sent to Mahalapye District Hospital as Matron in 1969. She left civil service in 1970 to take on politics and non-governmental work. She became a member of the Botswana Democratic Party in 1963 and worked on its campaigns and enrolled new members.

In October 1953 in Mahikeng, she married Gaolese Kent Koma, to whom she had been introduced by his cousin Kenneth Koma in Moeng College in northeastern Botswana. Mable Pinnie Mpa was a nurse at the time at Moeng College. She and her husband were lured initially by their relative Kenneth Koma to join him and start their party to be known as Botswana National Front. She is the founding member of Botswana Democratic Party's Women Wing in the mid-70s with people such as Lady Gladys Olebile Masire and Dr Gaositwe K. T. Chiepe. She campaigned for council in 1970 and won the council seat for the Dilaene ward in Mahalapye- a seat she left when she retired in 1998. She brought many developments to her ward and most notably she empowered many young people who kept voting for her election after another for 20 years. she helped form social groups for young people to keep them involved and to train them for future leadership. She is the founding member and former vice-chairperson of the Young Women's Christian Association which she retired from in 1998. She became Chairperson of the Central District council from 1986 until 1990. From 1990 onwards, she devoted much of her time to organizations such as Botswana's Young Women's Christian Association (BYWCA) and Botswana Council of Women (BCW). She travelled extensively through women's organization's mandate to countries like Lesotho, Zambia, South Africa, Egypt, China, Japan, Sweden and Germany. Koma mentored and introduced many future cadres of BDP, among them the current Botswana Democratic Party chairman, Daniel Kwelagobe whom she revered by calling his nephew and Assistant Minister of Local Government and Rural Development, Botlogile Tshireletso. She retired from politics in 1996 and was succeeded by Galebowe Selato. She sat on many local village boards including being Chairperson of the Board of Trustees for Mahalapye Development Trust for 10 years until 2002, Chairperson of Village Development Committee during her council tenure and Chairperson of Mahalapye Agricultural Show Committee for 10 years.

== Later life ==
Mable Pinnie Koma remained a farmer and ran a small business after retiring from public service. Koma spent her time between her business located in Herero Mall and her farm at the Western sand veld. She spent 10 years of her later life caring for her ailing husband who suffered a stroke in 1997 that left him bedridden until he died in 2006. She was Roman Catholic. Mable Pinnie Khutsafalo Koma died on the morning of 22 August 2008. She was buried next to her husband in Mahalapye. The couple had multiple adopted children.
