= Norman Molomo =

Botswana politician

Member of the National Assembly from Gaborone–Ramotswa
- In office 1965–1969
- Preceded by: Post created
- Succeeded by: Welly Seboni

Personal details
- Party: Botswana Democratic Party

Norman Molomo is a Botswana politician. He was a founding member of the Botswana Democratic Party (BDP). He was elected to represent the Gaborone–Ramotswa constituency in the 1965 election as a member of the BDP, receiving 4,069 votes compared to his opponent's 663 votes. Molomo served in the 1st Parliament of Botswana and then ran for the Mochudi constituency in the 1969 election, but he lost to Thari Motlhagodi of the Botswana People's Party. He received 666 votes.

Molomo is the half-brother of Matlapeng Ray Molomo with the same father, and they were both members of the mephato Mafiri.
