= List of ambassadors of Botswana to the United States =

Ambassador of Botswana to the United States Embassy of Botswana, Washington, D.C.
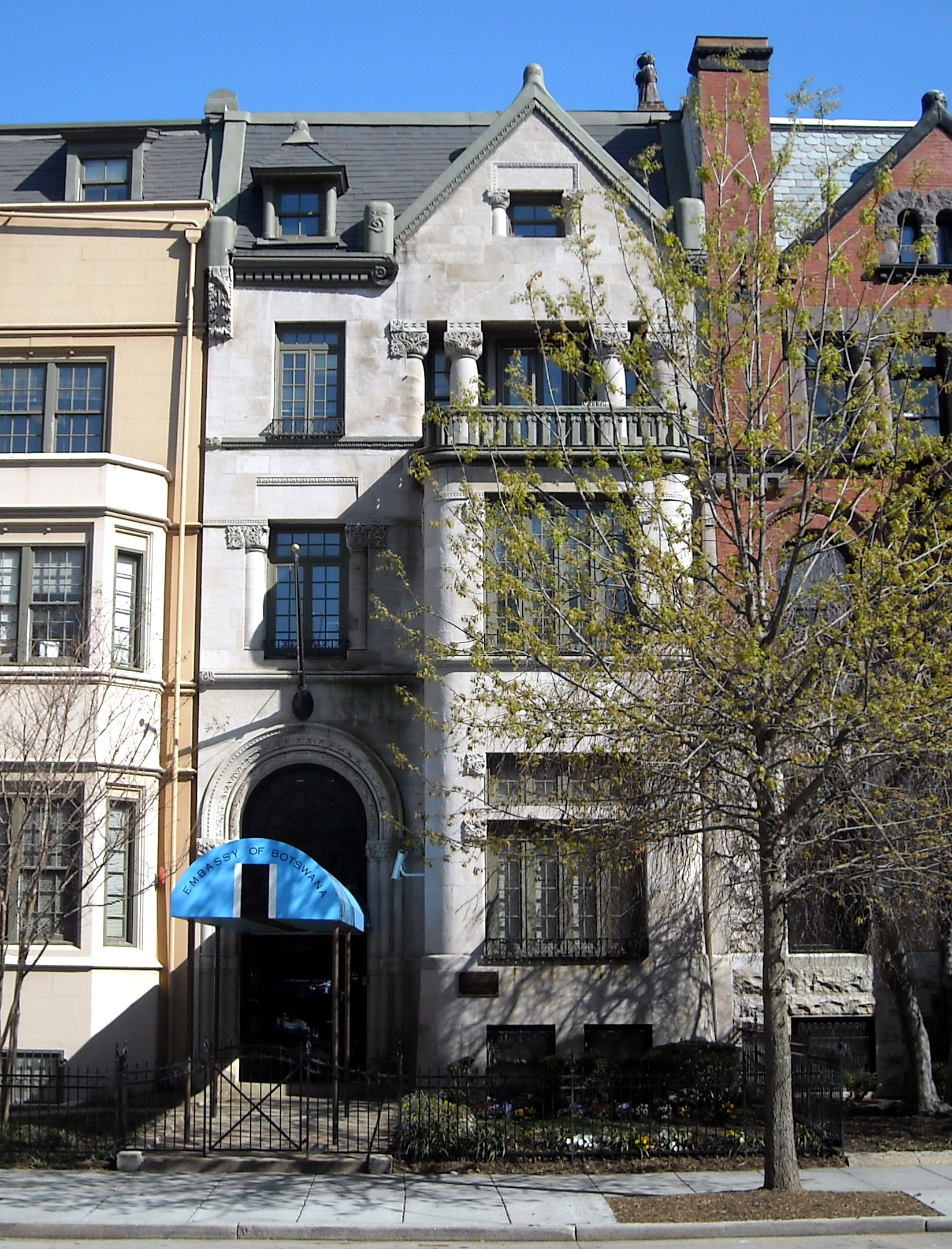
- Incumbent; Kitso Mokaila since 3 August 2015
- Inaugural holder: Z. K. Matthews
- Formation: 14 December 1966

The Botswana ambassador in Washington, D. C. is the official representative of the Government of Botswana to the Government of the United States. The Botswana ambassador to the United States is David John Newman, who completed his assignment in July 2020. His successor, Onkokame Kitso Mokaila, presented his credentials to President Trump on 25 August 2020.

== List of representatives ==
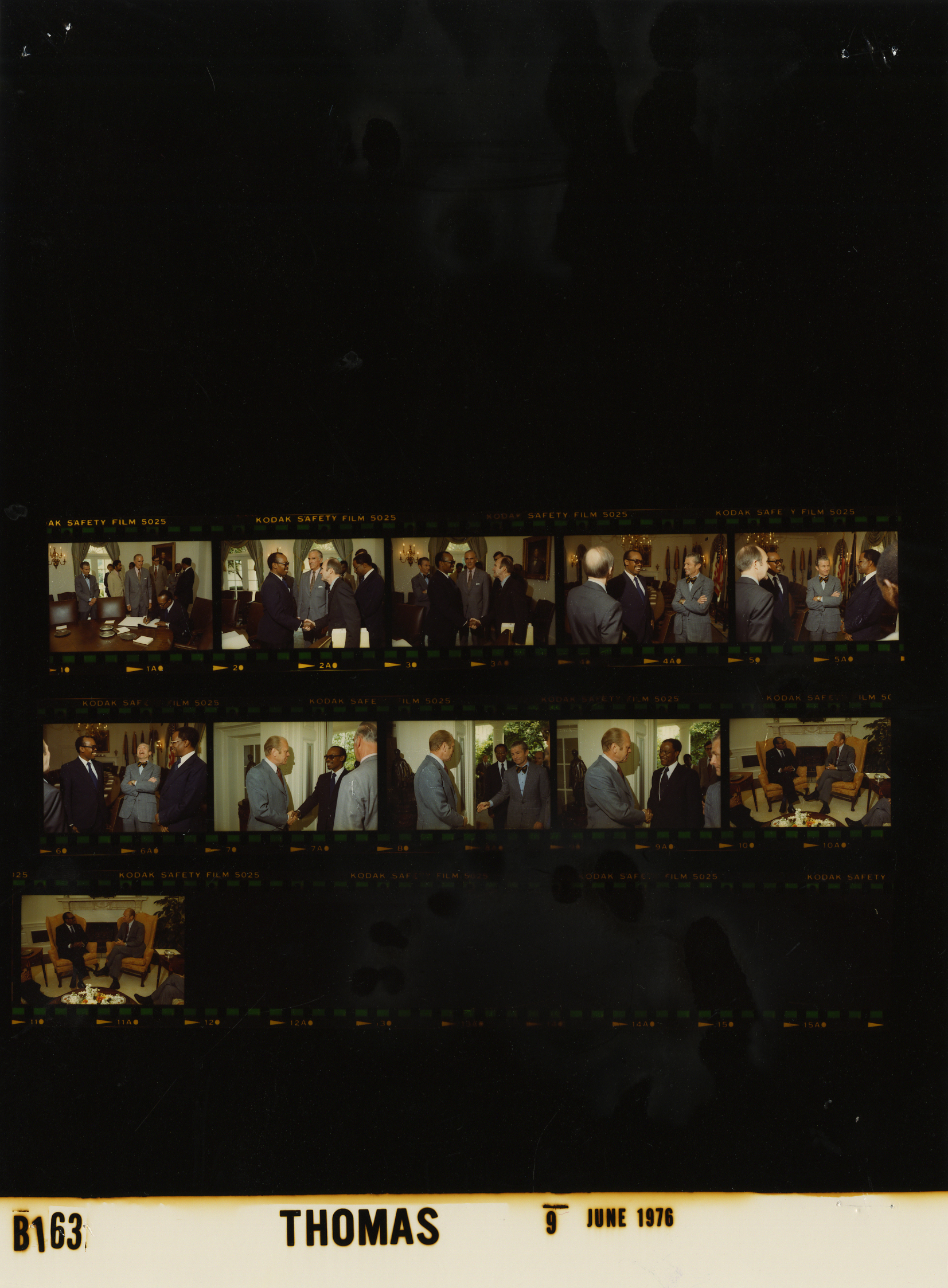
Archibald Mooketsa Mogwe

Diplomatic agreement/designated	Diplomatic accreditation	Ambassador	Observations	President of Botswana	List of presidents of the United States	Term end
15 November 1966	14 December 1966	Z. K. Matthews		Seretse Khama	Lyndon B. Johnson	
2 April 1969	17 April 1969	Linchwe II Kgafela	Kgosi-e-kgolo Linchwe II (1935–2007)	Seretse Khama	Richard Nixon	
9 June 1972	21 July 1972	Amos Manyangwa Dambe		Seretse Khama	Richard Nixon	
11 June 1976		Mogolori Modisi	Chargé d'affaires	Seretse Khama	Gerald Ford	
9 February 1977	17 February 1977	Bias Mookodi		Seretse Khama	Jimmy Carter	
14 November 1980	11 December 1980	Moteane John Melamu	From 1983 to 1985 he was ambassador in Bonn.	Quett Masire	Jimmy Carter	
5 June 1983		Mashite Keith Motsepe	Chargé d'affaires	Quett Masire	Ronald Reagan	
11 April 1984	13 April 1984	Serara Tsholofelo Ketlogetswe		Quett Masire	Ronald Reagan	
29 March 1989	11 May 1989	Botsweletse Kingsley Sebele	23 May 1944 in Serowe, Botswana A	Quett Masire	George H. W. Bush	
13 November 1995	6 February 1996	Archibald Mooketsa Mogwe		Quett Masire	Bill Clinton	
2 June 2000	5 September 2000	Kgosi Seepapitso	Kgosi Seepapitso IV (1933–2010), king of the Bangwaketse in Botswana, was born in Thaba Nchu, Lesotho, on 17 August 1933, the eldest son of Kgosi Bathoen	Festus Mogae	Bill Clinton	
17 October 2002	9 December 2002	Lapologang Caesar Lekoa		Festus Mogae	George W. Bush	
16 February 2011	23 February 2011	Tebelelo Mazile Seretse		Ian Khama	Barack Obama	
26 June 2015	3 August 2015	David John Newman		Ian Khama	Barack Obama	
	17 September 2020	Kitso Mokaila		Mokgweetsi Masisi	Donald Trump, Joe Biden	

  - Botswana–United States relations
