= White people in Botswana =

Minority ethnic group in Botswana

Languages
- English, Afrikaans, Swedish, Dutch, Serbian

Religion
- Christianity, Judaism

Related ethnic groups
- White South Africans, White Namibians, White people in Zambia, White Zimbabweans

White Africans have lived in Botswana since the 1860s, where the largest populations are of Afrikaner and British ancestry.

White settlers in Botswana, mainly Afrikaners and a small number of English speakers, began arriving in the 1860s and primarily settled on farms near the South African border. Botswana became a British protectorate in 1885 and gained independence as a Commonwealth country in 1966. The white population in Botswana never exceeded 3,000 individuals. The English spoken by the local population is influenced by South African dialects.

The present white population in Botswana is significantly smaller compared to its neighboring countries, with a considerable portion being non-permanent residents. This demographic trend is a result of Botswana's unique history as a protectorate rather than a colony. Many white Batswana can trace their ancestry back to colonial immigrants who arrived during British rule, although the majority are now citizens of Botswana rather than British. This demographic is typically affluent, with a significant number owning and operating their own businesses.

== History ==
European people began to immigrate into what is today the nation of Botswana in the 19th century, starting with the Boer people. The Dorsland Trek in the late 19th and early 20th centuries saw thousands of Boer families migrate from South Africa to present-day Namibia by way of Botswana. Many families stayed, especially in Ghanzi, which is in the Kalahari Desert. White people in Botswana are primarily of Boer/Afrikaner descent, but smaller numbers are also of British/Rhodesian ancestry as well. White miners came to Botswana to mine gold and diamonds.

Serbs began migrating to Botswana in the 1970s, facilitated by a visa-free regime for Yugoslav citizens. The Serbian community in Botswana, consisting of about 30 families, has been organized within the Serbian Society since 2011.

== Notable people ==
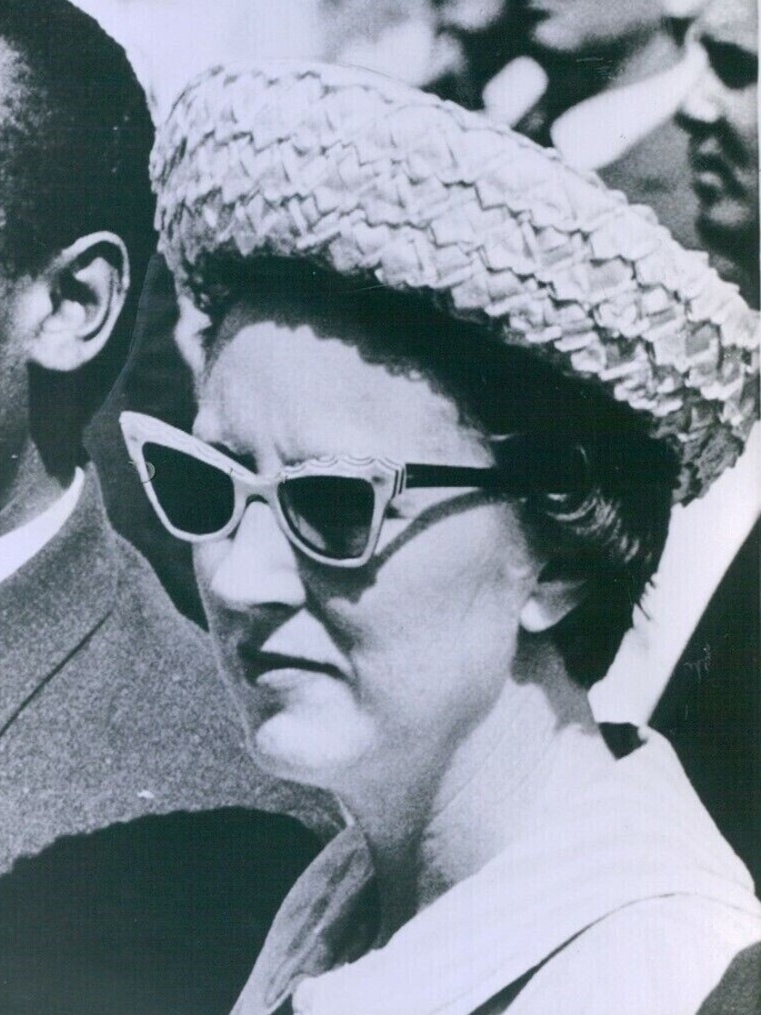
Ruth Williams Khama, Lady Khama, the inaugural First Lady of Botswana from 1966 to 1980.

- Lynette Armstrong, Accountant
- Roy Blackbeard, MP, High Commissioner from Botswana to the United Kingdom
- Ross Branch, Motorcycle racer
- Christian de Graaff, MP, Minister of Agriculture
- James G. Haskins, MP, Speaker of the National Assembly of Botswana
- Derek Jones, Mayor of Gaborone
- Ruth Williams Khama, the inaugural First Lady of Botswana
- Alfred Merriweather, MP, first Speaker of the National Assembly of Botswana
- Samantha Paxinos, Olympic swimmer for Botswana
- James Freeman, Olympic swimmer for Botswana
- Adrian Robinson, Olympic swimmer
- Benjamin Steinberg, MP, first Treasurer of the Botswana Democratic Party
- Hendrik van Zyl, famed trader and politician in Ghanzi

== See also ==
- White South Africans
- White Zimbabweans
- White Namibians
- White Zambians
- White Angolans
- Demographics of Botswana
- History of the Jews in Botswana
