= Benjamin Steinberg =

Benjamin Steinberg may refer to:

- Benjamin Steinberg (conductor) (1915–1974), American symphony conductor and violinist
- Benjamin Steinberg (politician) (1920–1975), Botswanan politician
