= Kenneth Matambo =

Botswana politician and former finance minister

Minister of Finance
- In office 1 August 2009 – 2019
- Preceded by: Baledzi Gaolathe
- Succeeded by: Thapelo Matsheka

Ontefetse Kenneth Matambo is a Botswana politician and economist. He served as the minister of finance and economic planning of Botswana from 1 August 2009 until 2019 when he left office.
