= Ramsey D. Molefe =

Botswana politician (1914–2010)

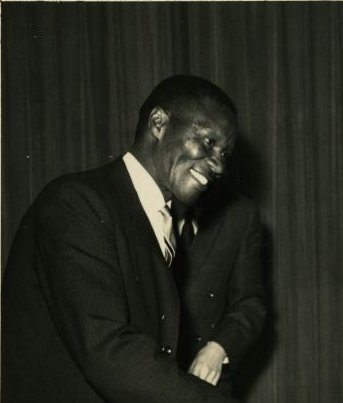
Molefe in 1966

Ramsey Diane Molefe (16 December 1914 – 2010) was a Botswana poet and politician. He served as parliamentary secretary in the Ministry of Agriculture while he was a specially elected member of the Parliament of Botswana.

== Life and career ==
Ramsey Diane Molefe was born on 16 December 1914 in Mochudi, Bechuanaland Protectorate (present-day Botswana). He attended the Tiger Kloof Educational Institute where he received his teacher training certificate in 1936. He then went to the University of South Africa where he received a bachelor's degree in international politics, Setswana language, and history in 1942.

He worked as a teacher, traveling between present-day Botswana, South Africa, and Zambia. He wrote his first poetry book, Mesomo, while in Zambia. Written in Setswana, he felt that he was bringing his nation a gift as he returned home. He also worked as a journalist, writing for the South African newspapers The Bantu World and Naledi-Ya-Batswana, and the Botswana Democratic Party newsletter Therisanto.

Molefe entered politics and became a specially elected member of the Parliament of Botswana. He served as parliamentary secretary for the Ministry of Agriculture. Molefe was also headmaster of Mahalapye Secondary School. Molefe won an international writing competition in 1964 and a poetry competition. He won second place in another poetry competition in 1980.

Molefe died in 2010.

== Writing ==
Molefe believed that writing in his native Setswana helped promote pride in the language in contrast with the nation's usual focus on English. He wrote for a domestic audience, believing that the poorly educated and non-English speaking parts of the nation could benefit from his message. He felt that writers served as a "watchdog of a nation".

He especially considered it important for young women to begin writing, saying that there were no women poets in Botswana. Books he wrote include:

- Mesomo [Food for Elderly People] (1965) – A Setswana poetry book
- Maipelo A Puo [Pride in a Language] – A Setswana poetry book
- This is Botswana – An unpublished English non-fiction book
