= White Zambians =

Racial and multi-ethnic group

Total population
- 40,000 (0.3%)

Regions with significant populations
- Lusaka and the Copperbelt

Languages
- English, Afrikaans

Religion
- Christianity and Judaism

Related ethnic groups
- White Zimbabweans, White South Africans, White people in Botswana

White people in Zambia or White Zambians are people from Zambia who are of European descent and who do not regard themselves, or are not regarded as, being part of another racial group. Many are of British ancestry and are descendants of people who worked in the Copperbelt Province.

== Background ==
The first Europeans to discover Zambia were the Portuguese in the late 1700s.

In the 1960s, White Zambians tended to favour white-minority rule in Rhodesia and the apartheid system in South Africa, although small numbers prevented them from establishing a similar form of government in Zambia. At the Copperbelt mines, 6,500 expatriate workers held South African citizenship. White Zambians made up the second-largest group of immigrants moving to South Africa by 1967, fearful of the changing political climate in Zambia.

Between 1964 and 1972, white Zambians were disproportionately represented in the officer corps of the Zambian Defence Force. Upon independence, most of the senior officer corps, including the chief of staff of the Zambian Army, were White Zambians. By 1972, sufficient numbers of qualified black Zambian personnel had been trained to replace them, and many of the white senior officers retired. For a number of years afterwards, white Zambians were explicitly barred from enlisting in the national military and received a blanket exemption from conscription.

In 1966, over half the whites lived on the Copperbelt, 18% lived in Lusaka, and some 95% lived in all near the line of rail from the Copperbelt to the Victoria Falls.

== Modern day ==
In 2014, Zambia had a White population of European origin which numbered approximately 40,000. Since independence, the community has never exceeded 1.1% of Zambia's population. Many long-term residents had voluntarily retained South African or British nationality. However, only about 40,000 hold Zambian citizenship. Guy Scott, a White Zambian citizen and former Vice President, became Acting President of Zambia after the unexpected death of President Michael Sata. This made him the first head of state of White European descent in Africa since F. W. de Klerk in 1989.

== Population chart ==
White Population of Zambia, 1911–2015
Government	Year	Whites	Change	Natives	Percentage of Whites
British South Africa Company (1891–1924)	1911	1,497	-	n/a	n/a
British South Africa Company (1891–1924)	1923	3,750	+2,253	1,753,000	0.2%
British South Africa Company (1891–1924)	1924	4,000	+250	n/a	n/a
British Protectorate of Northern Rhodesia (1924–1953)	1925	4,624	+624	n/a	n/a
British Protectorate of Northern Rhodesia (1924–1953)	1931	13,846	+9,222	n/a	n/a
British Protectorate of Northern Rhodesia (1924–1953)	1932	10,553	-3,293	n/a	n/a
British Protectorate of Northern Rhodesia (1924–1953)	1933	11,278	+725	n/s	n/a
British Protectorate of Northern Rhodesia (1924–1953)	1935	10,000	-1,278	n/a	n/a
British Protectorate of Northern Rhodesia (1924–1953)	1940	15,188	+5,188	2,099,000	0.7%
British Protectorate of Northern Rhodesia (1924–1953)	1943	18,745	+3,537	n/a	n/a
British Protectorate of Northern Rhodesia (1924–1953)	1945	21,371	+2,626	n/a	n/a
British Protectorate of Northern Rhodesia (1924–1953)	1946	21,919	+548	n/a	n/a
British Protectorate of Northern Rhodesia (1924–1953)	1951	37,221	+15,302	n/a	n/a
Federation of Rhodesia and Nyasaland (1953–1963)	1954	60,000	+22,779	n/a	n/a
Federation of Rhodesia and Nyasaland (1953–1963)	1956	64,800	+4,800	n/a	n/a
Federation of Rhodesia and Nyasaland (1953–1963)	1960	76,000	+11,200	3,082,627	2%
Federation of Rhodesia and Nyasaland (1953–1963)	1961	75,000	-1,000	3,269,151	2%
Federation of Rhodesia and Nyasaland (1953–1963)	1963	74,000	-1,000	3,368,961	2%
Republic of Zambia (1964–present)	1964	70,000	-4,000	3,472,843	0.2%
Republic of Zambia (1964–present)	1966	70,000	-	3,692,409	.2%
Republic of Zambia (1964–present)	1970	35,000	-35,000	4,179,000	.1%
Republic of Zambia (1964–present)	1977	10,000	-25,000	5,288,891	.02%
Republic of Zambia (1964–present)	2005	30,000	+20,000	11,470,022	.03%
Republic of Zambia (1964–present)	2014	40,000	+10,000	14,950,544	.03%

== See also ==
- White Angolans – Ethnic and racial group in Angola
- White Zimbabweans – Ethnic group in Zimbabwe
- History of the Jews in Zambia
- White Africans of European ancestry
- Demographics of Zambia
- White people in Botswana – Minority ethnic group in Botswana
- White South Africans – South African citizens of European ancestry
- History of Zambia
