= Gaona Dintwe =

Botswanan media personality

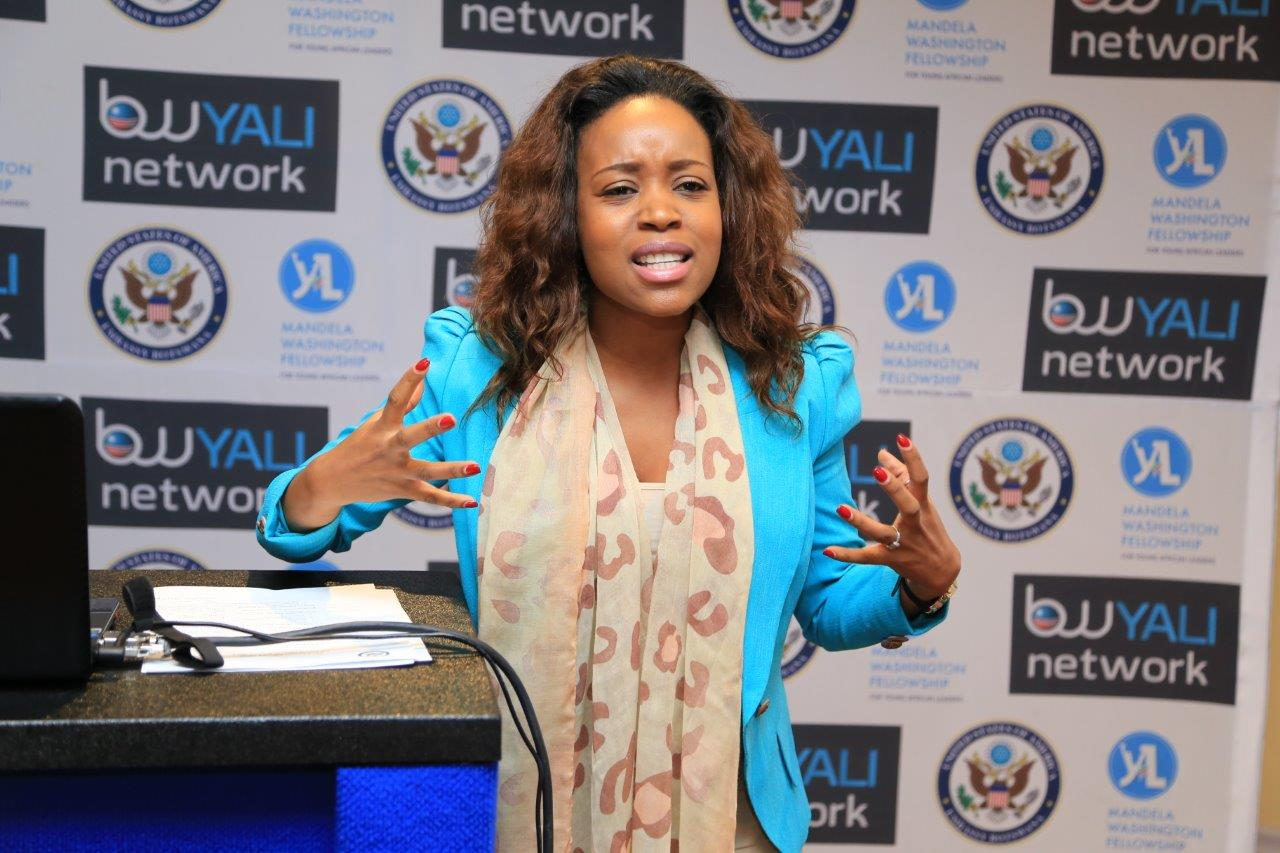
- Born: 1 May 1983 (age 43); Gaborone, Botswana
- Education: Monash South Africa
- Occupations: Presenter, TV personality, talk show host, event host, broadcast journalist
- Years active: 2006–present
- Website: gaonadintwe.com

Gaona Nketso Dintwe (born 1 May 1983) (nee Tlhasana) is a Botswana television presenter, talk show host, event host, broadcast journalist and media entrepreneur Since 2006. She has worked as a radio and TV presenter for Radio Botswana 2 and Botswana Television hosting several shows including RB2's midmorning 'Urban Flavas' and Botswana TV's morning. She has as well presented other TV Shows and currently hosts Gaona Live.

== Career ==
In 2006, Dintwe started her journey in media joining Radio Botswana 2 as a radio presenter. This was just after she graduated from Monash South Africa with a BA in Communications and Media Studies. At RB2, She hosted her mid-morning show Urban Flavas, an adult contemporary weekday mid-morning radio show that catered for the lovers of insightful human-centric talk accompanied by good music that is the perfect blend of classic and current hits. She subsequently joined the local Botswana Television, BTV, extending her media talents by also being a news reader on RB1 and RB 2 and was a news anchor on BTV. She on a number of occasions, had the opportunity to present live from parliament, the State Of The Nation Address by the President as well as the presentation of the Budget Speech by the Minister of Finance and Development planning, making her one of the few all round media practitioners in Botswana.

== GaonaLive Productions ==
In November 2015 Gaona founded GaonaLive Productions, which is a female run Premier Television Production company and Online Channel, currently hosted on two platforms, being GaonaLive Online and NOW TV- channel 290 on DSTV.

== I-RISE By Gaona ==
Gaona founded an apparel brand in 2018 which focuses on production of bespoke women’s sleepwear, loungewear, and headgear.

== Personal life ==
Dintwe married Thobo Tlhasana, her longtime friend and colleague, in September 2012. They struggled to conceive in their three-year marriage and in February 2015, Tlhasana became a voice for women dealing with infertility when she came out and spoke about her struggle with endometriosis. In December 2014, Dintwe and her husband were separated and divorced in September 2015 due to irreconcilable differences.

== Community involvement ==
In May 2014, Dintwe travelled to the USA as part of the inaugural cohort of the Young African Leaders Initiative, Mandela Washington Fellowship. The Fellowship Programme is President Barack Obama’s commitment to investing in the future of Africa. She was one of 15 Batswana selected to join a group of 500 young African leaders sent to 20 institutions across the USA. She spent six weeks at YALE University. She took a business and entrepreneurship leadership course and in addition to the classes at Yale, took part in many business workshops. She networked with local and regional business leaders and participated in community service projects where they met local residents in New Haven, Connecticut. The training gave her the opportunity to attend a summit in Washington, D.C. where the delegates got to interact with President Barack Obama and the First Lady of the USA, Michelle Obama. As part of the Mandela Washington Fellowship, Dintwe recently spent three months in Lagos, Nigeria, on an internship at the International Centre for Leadership Development (ICLD) Nigeria, a non-profit organization which provides Educational Mentoring, Career Guidance / Vocational Skill Training and Leadership Development. The ICLD Nigeria aims to empower young African leaders by providing them with Leadership and New Media Technology skills and tools, to help them realize their full potential and become productive citizens in their communities.

== Activism and Advocacy ==
Gaona has over the years, become an Endometriosis activist and advocate.

== Awards and recognition ==
In a recent BOCRA countrywide survey, she emerged as the most popular female broadcaster across all commercial radio stations and is a BOMU Music Awards recipient of the Best Electronic Journalist Award.

== See also ==
- Bogolo Kenewendo
- Peggy Serame
