= Thari Motlhagodi =

Motswana politician

Thari Wilson Motlhagodi was a Motswana politician. He represented Mochudi in the National Assembly of Botswana beginning in 1965 as a member of the oppositional Botswana People's Party.

== Biography ==
Thari Wilson Motlhagodi was one of the early members of the Botswana People's Party, and he was elected in 1965 to serve as the Member of Parliament for Mochudi in the National Assembly of Botswana. During the 1st Parliament of Botswana, Motlhagodi was one of only three members of the Botswana People's Party, along with Kenneth Nkhwa and Philip Matante. Upon his election, Motlhagodi joined Nkhwa in calling for a slower independence process, citing fears of internal unrest and foreign threats from neighboring governments. Motlhagodi has been described as one of the "Botswana People's Party firebrand[s]" of his era.
