= Botswana Vaccine Institute =

Botswana scientific research parastatal

Coordinates: 24°37′29″S 25°55′16″E

- BVI

Veterinary Research Institute overview
- Formed: 1978; 48 years ago
- Type: Veterinary Research Institute
- Jurisdiction: Government of Botswana
- Headquarters: Broadhurst Industrial Park, 6385/6390 Lejara Road, Gaborone, Botswana
- Veterinary Research Institute executives: Mpho Mphafe-Fish, Chairperson; Andrew Madeswi, Chief Executive Officer
- Website: Homepage

The Botswana Vaccine Institute (BVI) is a veterinary research institute owned by the Botswana government that carries out research on communicable diseases in domestic animals, with emphasis on viral transmitted infections. BVI manufactures vaccines against major animal diseases for use in Botswana and for sale in 16 African and Middle Eastern countries. BVI is a "leader in the research, manufacture and supply of livestock vaccines".

== Location ==
The headquarters and main offices of BVI are located in Broadhurst Industrial Park, 6385/90 Lejara Road, in the city of Gaborone, the capital of Botswana.

== Overview ==
BVI was founded in 1978. In 1979 the institution was registered as Botswana Vaccine Institute Limited, a self-funding company wholly owned by the government of Botswana. Over time, BVI forged a partnership with Merial, the French pharmaceutical conglomerate. Starting with vaccines against FMD, the institute has diversified into the research and manufacture of vaccines against anthrax, Contagious bovine pleuropneumonia, Ovine rinderpest, black quarter disease and rabies. The institute is an international reference laboratory on FMD.

== Developments ==
In February 2024, BVI and the Uganda Ministry of Agriculture, Animal Industry and Fisheries, began collaboration to manufacture a type-specific vaccine for FMD suitable for Uganda, for control of the disease and the prevention of future outbreaks.

== See also ==
- World Organisation for Animal Health
- Ministry of Agriculture (Botswana)
- Botswana Vaccine Institute Staff Union
- University of Botswana
