= Amos Dambe =

Motswana politician and diplomat (1911–1991)

Ambassador of Botswana to the United States
- In office 1972–1976

Member of the National Assembly of Botswana from Mmadinare
- In office 1965–1972

Personal details
- Born: Amos Manyangwa Dambe; 1911 Nswazwi, Central District, Botswana
- Died: 1991 (aged 79–80)
- Party: Botswana Democratic Party

Amos Manyangwa Dambe (1911–1991) was a Botswana politician and diplomat. He served in the National Assembly of Botswana and the Cabinet of Botswana from 1965 to 1972, and he was the ambassador of Botswana to the United States from 1972 to 1976. He was a founding member of the Botswana Democratic Party.

== Biography ==
Amos Manyangwa Dambe was born in Nswazwi, Botswana in May 1911. He attended school in Zimbabwe, South Africa, and at the Tati Training Institution before attending Adams College, where he was certified as a teacher. He served in the military where he served from 1946 to 1949 with the High Commission Territories Corps in the Middle East, obtaining the rank of sergeant major. He then became president of the BaKalanga Students' Association and the treasurer of the Bechuanaland Protectorate Teachers’ Association while working as a teacher and later as a headteacher. During this time, he wrote anonymous columns in the Naledi ya Batswana under the pen-name Push and Pull.

Dambe left education in 1955 and moved to Francistown to work for playwright Leetile Disang Raditladi. Dambe took Raditladi's lead and got involved in politics, becoming a founding member of the Bechuanaland Democratic Party (later the Botswana Democratic Party) in 1961. He was elected to the 1st Parliament of Botswana in 1965 to represent Mmadinare. He was also appointed Minister of Mines, Commerce and Industry on 5 March 1965, serving in this position for one year before being appointed Minister of Home Affairs on 5 April 1966. Dambe was reelected to the National Assembly of Botswana in 1969, at which point he was appointed Minister of Works and Communications. He was then appointed Minister of Agriculture in 1970. He retired from the National Assembly of Botswana in 1972 to become the ambassador to the United States. Dambe retired from this position in 1976, and he died in 1991.
