= Thapelo Matsheka =

Motswana politician and economist

The Honourable Thapelo Matsheka MP

Minister of Finance and Economic Development
- In office 6 November 2019 – April 2021
- President: Mokgweetsi Masisi
- Preceded by: Kenneth Matambo
- Succeeded by: Peggy Serame

Member of the National Assembly for Lobatse
- Incumbent
- Assumed office 5 November 2019
- Preceded by: Sadique Kebonang

Personal details
- Born: Thapelo Matsheka
- Party: Botswana Democratic Party
- Profession: Economist; Politician

Thapelo Matsheka is a Motswana politician and economist who served as the Minister of Finance and Economic Development from November 2019 to April 2021. He was elected as the Member of the National Assembly for Lobatse in October 2019. He is a member of the Botswana Democratic Party. Matsheka is the former Managing Director of Fiducia Services.

== Career ==
Matsheka holds a PhD in economics from the University of Kent. He was the Chief Executive Officer of Citizen Entrepreneurship Development Agency, the government’s entrepreneurship scheme, from 2003 to 2010. He then worked for AON Botswana before resigning to form Fiducia Services in August 2017.

For the 2019 general election, Matsheka was the Botswana Democratic Party's parliamentary candidate for Lobatse. He was elected and succeeded Sadique Kebonang. President Mokgweetsi Masisi appointed him as the Minister of Finance and Economic Development on 6 November 2019, and he took office on the same day. He delivered his first budget speech in February 2020. He was replaced as minister responsible for public finance in April 2021.

== Other activities ==
- African Development Bank (AfDB), Ex-Officio Member of the Board of Governors (since 2019)
- World Bank, Ex-Officio Member of the Board of Governors (since 2019)
