= Motlatsi Segokgo =

Minister of Finance
- In office 1966–1967
- President: Seretse Khama
- Preceded by: Benjamin Thema
- Succeeded by: Quett Masire

Personal details
- Born: 1928
- Died: 1977
- Political party: Botswana Democratic Party

Motlatsi Keseabetwe Segokgo (1928–1977) was a Motswana politician. He served as a member of the National Assembly of Botswana and the Cabinet of Botswana from their foundation in 1965 until he took his own life amid a corruption scandal in 1977.

== Biography ==
Motlatsi Keseabetwe Segokgo was born in Tlokweng, Bechuanaland Protectorate, in 1928. He worked as a teacher, serving as head teacher of Batlokwa National School. He then moved from education to politics, joining the Bechuanaland Democratic Party. He was elected to the National Assembly of Botswana in 1965 to represent the Kgatleng and Tlokweng constituency. Segokgo was appointed Minister of Finance upon taking office in the 1st Parliament of Botswana. He was appointed Minister of Commerce, Industry, and Water Affairs in 1974 and then became the Minister of Mineral Resources and Water Affairs in 1974. He was accused of corruption while in office, and President Seretse Khama asked Segokgo to resign from the cabinet. Segokgo committed suicide rather than resigning. His children have since become politically active.
