= Tebelelo Seretse =

Ambassador of Botswana to the United States

Tebelelo Mazile Seretse

Personal details
- Born: Botswana
- Party: Botswana Democratic Party
- Education: BA Economics; BA Accounting; MA; LL.B.
- Alma mater: Morgan State University; University of Cincinnati; University of Botswana
- Occupation: Politician, diplomat

Tebelelo Mazile Seretse was the first woman to serve as ambassador to the United States from Botswana (effective February 14, 2011). While a member of Parliament from 1999 - 2004, she had three Cabinet level positions: Acting Minister of Presidential Affairs, Minister of Trade and Industry, Wildlife and Tourism and Minister of Works, Transport and Communications.

== Early life ==
Seretse graduated from Morgan State University with a BA in Economics and a BA in Accounting before earning a MA from the University of Cincinnati and an LL.B. law degree from the University of Botswana.

She was Director and Chairperson of RPC Data Limited, "the largest integrated information technology services company in Botswana."

== Political career ==
Seretse served as a Member of Parliament from 1999 to 2004, and during that time served in three Cabinet-level positions. She served as Acting Minister of Presidential Affairs, Minister of Trade and Industry, Wildlife and Tourism and then Minister of Works, Transport and Communications. In the parliament, she represented Serowe South.

In July 2019, she was appointed to lead the Botswana Democratic Party's campaigns as their campaign manager ahead of the 2019 Botswana general election. This came after a high-profile split in the BDP when former President Ian Khama left the party to join the Botswana Patriotic Front.

In September 2021, the Minister of Tertiary Education, Research, Science and Technology (MoTE), Dr. Douglas Letsholathebe, announced the appointment of Ambassador Tebelelo Mazile Seretse as the Chancellor of the University of Botswana. The appointment was made by President Mokgweetsi Masisi and is effective from 1 September 2021 until 31 August 2026.

== Personal life ==
Seretse was formally married to businessman Tlholego Seretse, with whom she jointly owned two companies with, from 1985 until their divorce in 2005. Following her late husband's death, she got into a legal dispute with his second wife over control of two of Tholego's companies, which she claimed she was unlawfully removed from and was null and void.
