= Ministry of Finance (Botswana) =

Government ministry of Botswana

Agency overview
- Jurisdiction: Government of Botswana
- Headquarters: Gaborone, Botswana
- Minister responsible: Ndaba Gaolathe
- Child agency: Financial Intelligence Agency
- Website: finance.gov.bw

The Ministry of Finance is the Botswana government ministry which formulates financial and economic policies and oversees effective coordination of Government financial operations. As of March 2026, the minister is Ndaba Gaolathe.

== Current and previous Ministers ==
Ministers of Finance of the Botswana since 1965:

Name	Year	Citation
Benjamin Thema	1965-1966	
Motlatsi Segokgo	1966-1967	
Quett Masire	1967-1968	
James G. Haskins	1968-1970	
Quett Masire	1971-1980	
Peter Mmusi	1980-1989	
Festus Mogae	1989-1998	
Ponatshego Kedikilwe	1998-1999	
Baledzi Gaolathe	1999-2009	
Kenneth Matambo	2009-2019	
Thapelo Matsheka	2019-2021	
Peggy Serame	2021–2024	

== See also ==
- Government of Botswana
- Ministry of Transport and Communications
