= Botswana Vaccine Institute Staff Union =

Trade union affiliate in Botswana

BVSU
- Botswana Vaccine Institute Staff Union
- Headquarters: Gaborone, Botswana
- Location: Botswana
- Key people: Elliot Modise, general secretary
- Affiliations: BFTU

The Botswana Vaccine Institute Staff Union (BVSU) is a trade union representing workers at the Botswana Vaccine Institute. It is an affiliate of the Botswana Federation of Trade Unions in Botswana.
