= Kgabo Commission =

1991 Botswana corruption inquiry

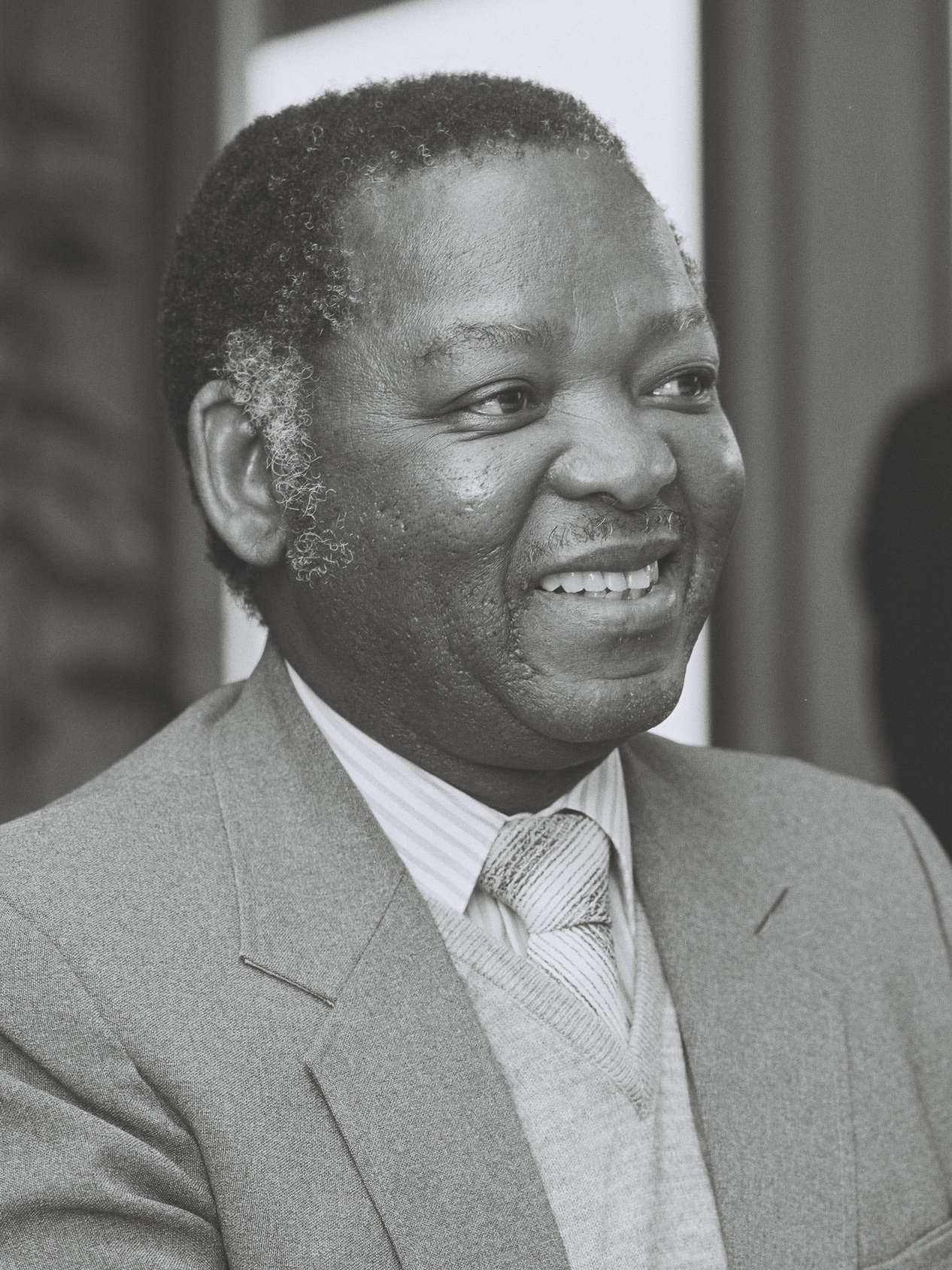
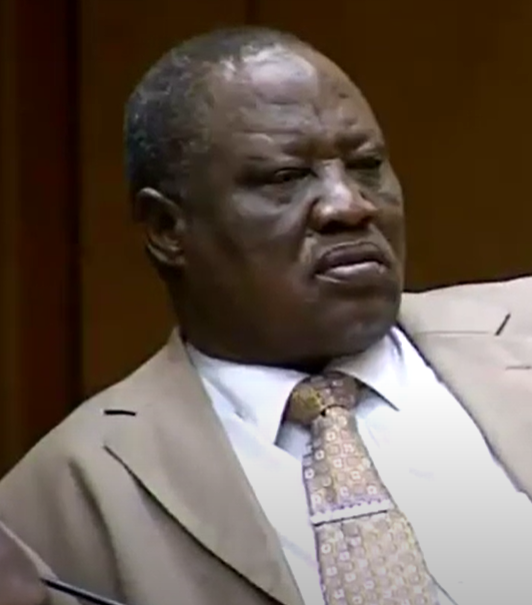
Vice-President Peter Mmusi and Minister of Agriculture Daniel Kwelagobe were implicated by the Kgabo Commission.

The Presidential Commission of Inquiry into Land Problems in Mogoditshane and Other Peri-Urban Villages, also known as the Kgabo Commission, was a 1991 commission of inquiry established by the government of Botswana. It was created to investigate allegations that land was being sold and purchased illegally in peri-urban villages such as Mogoditshane without the authorisation of land boards. Englishman Kgabo was appointed as its chairman. It published its findings and recommendations in the Kgabo Report, which found that due to housing shortages and a failure of the land board system, most land sales in Mogoditshane were unauthorised.

The commission caused a major political scandal when it implicated Vice-President Peter Mmusi and Minister of Agriculture Daniel Kwelagobe, both of whom held leadership positions in the dominant Botswana Democratic Party (BDP). They resigned from their positions, but the party reelected them as party leaders in the subsequent congress. The accusations against Mmusi and Kwelagobe were declared void by the High Court of Botswana because they were not granted a hearing to defend themselves. The scandal prompted two factions to form within the party, those who supported Mmusi and Kwelagobe and those who opposed them, and these factions dominated politics in Botswana for the next two decades.

== Background ==
The Tribal Land Act was enacted in Botswana in 1968, shortly after Botswana's independence. It created a system of land boards responsible for overseeing the allocation of land. Each land board corresponded to a specific tribe or a subdivision within a tribe. They acted as trustees of the land, taking over the role that was traditionally held by the tribe's chief, and had broad power to rule on land trades based on the best interest of the tribe. There were 12 primary land boards and 33 subordinate land boards as of 1992.

Botswana underwent a period of significant urbanisation in the 1980s, causing the expansion of peri-urban villages around major cities. New residents moved to these villages faster than land was being allocated and housing was being constructed, leading to shortages. The land board system was facing criticism, compelling the government to act. Land allocation of peri-urban villages, particularly in Mogoditshane, was taking place at this time in a way that violated the Tribal Land Act. Residents, unable to engage in land sales because of shortages and an overburdened system, circumvented the land board and carried out the sales illicitly. Many residents were suspected to be holding land illegally, and court challenges by the local land board saw mixed results in determining ownership and delivering eviction notices.

== Commission ==
=== Inquiry ===
To address allegations of illegal land sales, an investigation was opened by Peter Mmusi, who held the dual role of Vice-President of Botswana and Minister of Local Government, Lands and Housing. A government evaluation of the Tribal Land Act found that land boards did not have enough staff members or elected tribal representatives, and it recommended the removal of tribal chiefs' personal representatives. Mmusi then requested that the President of Botswana, Quett Masire, form a commission of inquiry regarding illicit land deals. The commission was to be headed by Englishman Kgabo, who was a respected figure in the Botswana Democratic Party and had been a member since its founding in 1962. The commission was established on 25 July 1991, and proceedings took place over the following five months.

=== Findings ===
On October, 1989, Mr Kwelagobe wrote an appeal and personally handed it to the Minister of Local Government, Lands and Housing who later directed the Land Board to comply with Mr Kwelagobe's request. The appeal did not follow the normal channels. The Land Board granted Mr Kwelagobe a customary grant certificate that is, for a tshimo (field). This provoked a second protracted dispute since Mr Kwelagobe wanted the tshimo converted to a common law grant which enables the holder to initiate commercial activities on the property and again the Minister ruled in Kwelagobe's favour.

— The Kgabo Report on the commission's findings regarding Mmusi and Kwelagobe

The Kgabo Commission published its findings in the Kgabo Report in December 1991. The commission confirmed that land deals were often carried out without authorisation from the land board. It identified 841 illegal lots in Mogoditshane with a high likelihood that there were others, and it estimated that over 90% of the village's ploughing fields had been illegally subdivided and had residential structures installed. In many cases, land allocated to specific tribes was sold to people who were not residents of the tribe, including people who were not citizens of Botswana.

The commission blamed the spread of unauthorised land deals on the government's inability to carry them out in a timely manner. Many buyers and sellers believed that this justified their actions. Many also disagreed that their land was under the land board's jurisdiction if their ownership predated the land board's creation. Others deceived buyers by selling land that they did not own.

People who were questioned during the inquiry confirmed that those engaged in the land deals included high ranking government officials. During its proceedings, the commission discovered that the minister of agriculture, Daniel Kwelagobe, had circumvented the land board by requesting that Vice-President Mmusi use his office as Minister of Local Government, Lands and Housing to acquire the lands for him. Mmusi then directed the land board to accept the request against procedure. The commission also found that the involvement of high ranking figures such as Mmusi and Kwelagobe set an example that encouraged violations among the public. In addition to their government positions, Mmusi was the chairman of the BDP and Kwelagobe was the party's secretary-general. The commission concluded that Mmusi had acted inappropriately when he upheld Kwelagobe's appeal to obtain land in Nkoyaphiri, but had not done anything explicitly illegal.

=== Recommendations ===
The commission recommended restructuring the land board system by dissolving two specific land boards, and by establishing dedicated sub-boards for peri-urban villages involved in planning legislation. Regarding the boards' members, it recommended that staff members receive more training, that villages should more carefully determine who they send as tribal representatives, and that chiefs' personal representatives should play a greater role in land board affairs. It also recommended that the government should exert more control over who serves on land boards. For legal changes, the commission recommended that the jurisdiction of land boards should be clarified under the law, and that penalties for unauthorised land deals should be codified and enforced by the customary courts.

To address illegal land deals that had already taken place, it recommended that the government seize all illegally purchased land while compensating landowners for any development on the seized land, and that landowners residing on the land be given three months to depart. It suggested offering equivalent land elsewhere as an alternative form of compensation if the landowner wished, in line with the Tribal Land Act's provision that this is acceptable compensation during eminent domain.

The ruling in the court case Kweneng Land Board v. Kabelo Matlho and Others established that land boards had no jurisdiction over certain cases of private land ownership, The commission challenged the ruling. It recommended that an appeal of the case include an argument that any land allocated by a chief prior to the land board's establishment was legally equivalent to a land board allocation and therefore under the land board's jurisdiction. It considered the implications of the case "too ghastly to contemplate".

== Government response ==
The government drafted a white paper that endorsed most of the commission's recommendations. It differed in some areas, rejecting the dissolution of any land boards and arguing that tribal chiefs' representatives should have less influence instead of more. It also proposed that violations of the Tribal Land Act be prosecuted through customary law in specially created land tribunals instead of through statutes in court. To address the subdivision of lots, the government amended the Tribal Land Act to repeal Section 10 (2), which had been the subject of Kweneng Land Board v. Kabelo Matlho and Others. It also implemented new penalties for violating the law in Section 39.

Particularly controversial was the recommendation that illegal landowners be compensated for development, which the government rejected both due to the extensive cost (approximately 79% of the land was developed) and because of a lack of bureaucratic infrastructure to determine land value or to manage improvements such as housing. As evicting 4,000 people would create a homelessness crisis, and given that the government was partially responsible for the land shortages, President Masire pardoned everyone who had engaged in illegal land deals. Instead, the government determined that landowners should be allowed to keep developed land after paying a fine of 5,000 pula, with seizure and compensation considered for undeveloped land. This offer was not extended to non-citizens. It is believed that many landowners who had illegally purchased land began development once the government's position was announced so they could keep the land.

== Political scandal ==
=== Resignation of Mmusi and Kwelagobe ===
Both the BDP and the opposition condemned Mmusi and Kwelagobe for their engagement in illegal land deals once the Kgabo Report was tabled for consideration, describing their actions as corruption and abuse of office. Students and trade unions organised protests. President Masire was a long-time ally of both Mmusi and Kwelagobe, and he had been friends with Mmusi for many years. As the situation escalated in March, Masire went on a diplomatic trip to Japan until 5 March.

The political pressure convinced Mmusi and Kwelagobe to resign from their respective cabinet and party leadership positions. Kwelagobe announced his resignation at the conclusion of a budget report during a legislative session, and Mmusi resigned shortly thereafter. Both became backbenchers in the legislature with little direct political power. Mmusi recommended Ponatshego Kedikilwe as his replacement. Instead, Masire appointed a relative unknown, Festus Mogae, as the new vice-president days later on 9 March. His reasoning was that Mogae was not affiliated with either of the factions that were developing within the party.

=== Political and legal challenges ===
Mmusi and Kwelagobe insisted that the commission had been filled with political enemies as part of a conspiracy to oust them from their leadership positions. They attributed blame to a faction led by Mompati Merafhe, which included Roy Blackbeard, Chapson Butale, David Magang, and Bahiti Temane. These men came to be known as the "Big Five". In contrast to the Big Five, Mmusi and Kwelagobe came to be known as the "Big Two". Kwelagobe was on good terms with the commission's chairman Kgabo, and he believed that Kgabo had little actual power during the proceedings. Some of Mmusi and Kwelagobe's supporters alleged that the Big Five was engaging in regionalism as Masire, Mmusi, and Kwelagobe were all southerners, though the Big Five also had southern members and the Big Two had significant support in the north.

Mmusi and Kwelagobe sued the government, arguing that the commission had violated the Commission of Inquiry Act by holding closed proceedings. They argued that they were entitled to a hearing before being implicated. In response, the BDP suspended Mmusi and Kwelagobe from the party entirely. Masire had discouraged them from taking legal action, feeling that any challenge to the government was also a challenge to the party. In another attempt to restore their standing in the party, Mmusi and Kwelagobe travelled across Botswana to speak to other members of the BDP and regain their support.

The lawsuit occurred at the same time as the party's 1993 national congress in Kanye. Mmusi and Kwelagobe argued that they had the legal right to challenge the election of party officials, but the BDP argued that the action against the government was separate from the party's internal processes. Despite expectations of a Big Five victory, Mmusi and Kwelagobe did well in the party's internal vote and reclaimed their previous party positions as chairman and secretary general. This congress is remembered as the Kgola Disana (transl. cut tree stumps). The High Court of Botswana ruled in favour of Mmusi and Kwelagobe on 26 August 1994 and declared the implications against them null and void.

== Aftermath ==
The Kgabo Commission coincided with other political scandals, including those at the Botswana Housing Corporation, the National Development Bank, and the distribution of supplies to primary schools. These scandals harmed Botswana's reputation as a country free of corruption. The scandal surrounding the Kgabo Commission was one of the factors that led to the establishment of the Directorate on Corruption and Economic Crime in 1994.

The Kgabo Commission marked the beginning of factionalism that came to dominate the BDP. The inter-party conflict hurt the party electorally in the 1994 general election, allowing the Botswana National Front to win several seats and challenge the BDP as a major opposition party. Mmusi died shortly before the 1994 election. He was replaced in the Big Two by Kedikilwe, and their faction became known as Barata-Phathi. The Big Five took Jacob Nkate as an additional leader and became known as the A-Team. Mogae's appointment as vice-president meant that he succeeded to the presidency at the end of Masire's term. Mogae and his successor Ian Khama both formally denounced factionalism but were generally understood to favour the A-Team. The factions that sprang from the Kgabo Commission remained the dominant forces in the BDP until 2010, when Barata-Phathi split to form the Botswana Movement for Democracy in protest of Khama's governance.

Further investigations produced evidence that illicit land deals were an ongoing problem. Mogae introduced the Lesetedi Commission in 2004, which served a similar purpose investigating land trading in Gaborone. This investigation also uncovered corrupt land dealings by government officials. In response, Jacob Nkate became known for his willingness to raze illegally held lands in Mogoditshane when he became minister of lands and housing. This was common enough that bulldozers came to be known as the "yellow monster" among locals. Illegal land deals and corruption were still common around land boards as of 2023.
