= Ministry of Agriculture (Botswana) =

Government ministry of Botswana

The Ministry of Agriculture is a ministry within the Cabinet of Botswana. It was first established as the Department of Agriculture under the Bechuanaland Protectorate in 1935.

== Ministers ==
- Moutlakgola P.K. Nwako (1965)
- Tsheko Tsheko (1965–1969)
- Amos Damba (1970–1972)
- Lenyeletse Seretse (c. 1974)
- James George Haskins (c. 1970s)
- Christian de Graaff (2008–2015)
- Patrick Pule Ralotsia (c. 2016 – c. 2019)
- Edwin Dikoloti (2019–)
- Fidelis Macdonald Molao (2022–present)2024-present Dr Micus Chimbombi

== See also ==
- Botswana Vaccine Institute
