= Benjamin Thema =

Benjamin C. Thema

Minister of Finance
- In office 1965–1966
- Prime Minister: Seretse Khama
- Succeeded by: Motlatsi Segokgo

Personal details
- Born: 1912
- Died: 1982 (aged 69–70)
- Party: Botswana Democratic Party

Benjamin C. Thema (1912 – 1982) was a Motswana educationist and politician.

Thema was born in Ranaka, Bangwaketse Reserve. He became the first president of Bechuanaland Student Association in 1939. In 1946 he founded the Tshidi Barolong secondary school in Mafikeng, and in 1955 became its principal.

He joined the Bechuanaland Democratic Party in 1964, and was elected to the National Assembly in the elections of 1965. Then he joined the cabinet, first as Minister of Finance 1965-1966, and from 1966 to 1974 as Minister of Education.
