= Gaefalale Sebeso =

Motswana politician (1908–1992)

Gaefalale Gaolebale Sebeso (1908–1992) was a Motswana politician. He served as a member of National Assembly of Botswana from 1965 to 1989, representing Tswapong South and serving as deputy speaker for the duration of his tenure. He was a member of the Botswana Democratic Party.

== Biography ==
Gaefalale Gaolebale Sebeso was born in 1908. Prior to World War II, Sebeso served as the headmaster of Shoshong School. He declined to take an exemption during the war, and he served as a non-commissioned officer. After the war, he worked as a sub-African authority, first in Palapye in 1953 and in Mahalapye in 1964. Sebeso was one of the early members of the Botswana Democratic Party in the 1960s. He was elected to the 1st Parliament of Botswana to represent Tswapong South in 1965, where he was made deputy speaker. He supported a strong legislature independent from the presidency. He tabled a motion to strengthen the National Assembly of Botswana in 1988, arguing that it had "been relegated to the lower status of a minor department". The motion went unaddressed for fourteen years before a task force made its recommendations, which were then rejected by the executive. Sebeso retired from the National Assembly in 1989, and he died in 1992.
