= Linchwe II Kgafela =

Botswana Paramount Chief

- Kgosi of the Bakgatla-ba-Kgafela

Kgosi of the Bakgatla-ba-Kgafela
- Reign: 6 April 1963 – 2007
- Coronation: 6 April 1963
- Predecessor: Molefi II
- Successor: Linchwe II Kgafela
- Born: May 2, 1935; Mochudi, Bechuanaland Protectorate
- Died: 2007; Botswana
- Spouse: Kathleen Nono Motsepe
- Issue: Seingwaeng Kgafela; Kgafela II; Bakgatla Kgafela; Mmusi Kgafela
- House: Bakgatla-ba-Kgafela
- Father: Molefi II
- Mother: Motlatsi Pilane

Linchwe II Kgafela (2 May 1935 – 2007), also known as '''Kgosi Linchwe II''', was the paramount chief (''kgosi'') of the Bakgatla-ba-Kgafela people of Botswana from 1963 until he died in 2007. During his reign, he served as Ambassador of Botswana to the United States and President of the Customary Court of Appeal.

== Early life ==
Linchwe II was born on 2 May 1935 in Mochudi, Bechuanaland Protectorate, to Molefi II and Motlatsi Pilane. He was the only son of Molefi II, the chief of the Bakgatla-ba-Kgafela.

== Chieftainship ==
After the death of Molefi II, Linchwe II was installed as paramount chief of the Bakgatla-ba-Kgafela on 6 April 1963. He later served as a member of the House of Chiefs (now Ntlo ya Dikgosi) and remained chief until he died in 2007.

== Public service ==
Linchwe II served as Botswana's ambassador to the United States from 1969 to 1972. He also served as chairman of the Kgatleng District Council and was president of the Botswana National Football Association during the late 1970s.

== Personal life ==
Linchwe II married Kathleen Nono Motsepe in 1966. They had four children: Seingwaeng, Kgafela II, Bakgatla, and Mmusi Kgafela.

== Death and succession ==
Linchwe II died in 2007. He was succeeded by his son, Kgafela II, who was installed as chief of the Bakgatla-ba-Kgafela in 2008.
