= Ministry of Transport and Communications (Botswana) =

Government ministry of Botswana

The Ministry of Transport and Communications (MTC) is a government ministry of Botswana.

== History ==
It was previously known as Ministry of Works and Transport (Botswana).]In 2024, following the change of Government, ] the Ministry was split into 2, the transport sector was combined with Infrastructure to make the Ministry of Transport and Infrastructure, while the Communications sector and the Innovation sector formed the Ministry of Communications and Innovation.

== See also ==
- Ministry of Finance (Botswana)
