= Tsheko Tsheko =

Motswana politician (1923–1969)

Tsheko Tsheko MBE (1923 – 1969) was a Motswana politician. He was a member of the National Assembly of Botswana from 1965 to 1969, where he served in the Cabinet of Botswana.

== Biography ==
He was born in Ngamiland, Bechuanaland Protectorate in 1923. He ran a successful business in the 1940s exporting muti products to South Africa. In 1945, he began a career in the Batwana tribal administration. He joined the Bechuanaland Democratic Party in 1964 to serve as the party's Ngamiland leader. In 1965, Tsheko was elected to the 1st Parliament of Botswana to represent the Okavango constituency. His election was one of only two competitive races in the 1965 Bechuanaland general election, defeating Botswana Independence Party candidate Motsamai Mpho with 53.7% of the vote. While in the National Assembly, he was appointed Minister of Local Government and then Minister of Agriculture. Tsheko died at the end of his term in 1969.
