= Pulafela Sebotho =

Motswana politician

Member of Parliament from Ngwaketse–Kgalagadi
- Preceded by: Office established

Personal details
- Political party: Botswana Democratic Party

Pulafela M. Sebotho was a Motswana politician. He was elected to the Parliament of Botswana in the 1965 general election to represent Ngwaketse–Kgalagadi.
