= Kenneth Nkhwa =

Motswana politician (1927–2024)

Kenneth Moesi Nkhwa (1927 – 9 December 2024) was a Motswana politician. He was a member of the National Assembly of Botswana from its creation in 1965 until he lost reelection in 1989. He represented the North-West constituency as a member of the Botswana People's Party.

== Life and career ==
Kenneth Moesi Nkhwa was born in 1927. He completed his junior certificate at Tiger Kloof before serving with the British Colonial Forces in Egypt during World War II, and he then attended Tiger Kloof in South Africa to complete his education in 1948. He married Grace Ntombinkulu in 1958.

Nkhwa joined the Bechuanaland People's Party in 1963, and he was made the party's South African Branch coordinator. He was elected to represent the Tati West constituency (later the North-West constituency) in the 1965 general election, winning with 51.6% of the vote. It was the most competitive race of the election, and one of only two races with four candidates. Nkhwa advocated a slower independence process following the election, citing risks of internal unrest. As a member of the National Assembly of Botswana, Nkhwa supported welfare state policies such as providing school fees for children and distributing food rations during droughts.

By the 1984 general election, Nkhwa was the only member of the Botswana People's Party in the National Assembly. He lost reelection in the 1989 general election by 351 votes. After leaving the National Assembly, Nkhwa became the chairman of the North East District Council, where he remained until 1999.

The Thapama Interchange was named after Nkhwa in 2019. As of 2020, he was the last surviving member of the 1st Parliament of Botswana, following the death of Obed Itani Chilume. Nkhwa died on 9 December 2024, at the age of 97.
