= Ramokgonami =

- Village
- Location within Botswana
- Coordinates: 22°51′52″S 27°25′26″E
- Country: Botswana
- District: Central District

Population (2011)
  - Total: 4,486
- Time zone: GMT +2
- Climate: BSh

Ramokgonami is a village located in the Central District of Botswana. It had 4,486 inhabitants at the 2011 census.

== See also ==
- List of cities in Botswana
