= Peggy Serame =

Motswana politician

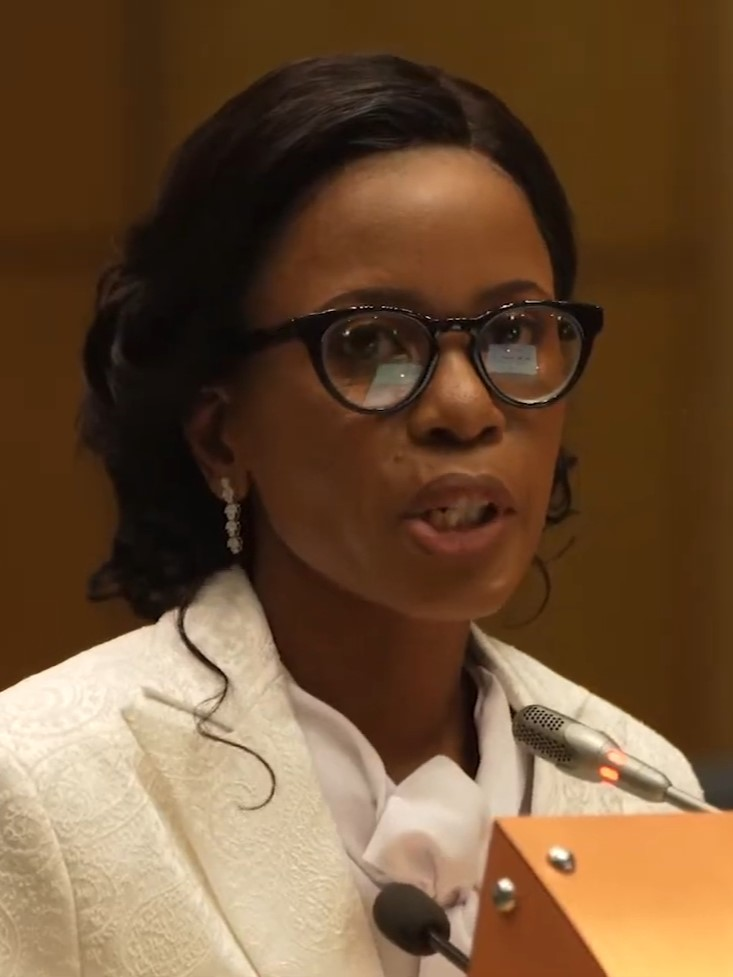
- Serame in 2022

Minister of Finance and Economic Development
- In office 16 April 2021 – 1 November 2024
- President: Mokgweetsi Masisi
- Preceded by: Thapelo Matsheka
- Succeeded by: Ndaba Gaolathe (Finance)

Minister of Investment, Trade and Industry
- In office 6 November 2019 – 16 April 2021
- President: Mokgweetsi Masisi
- Preceded by: Bogolo Kenewendo

Personal details
- Citizenship: Botswana
- Party: Botswana Democratic Party
- Education: University of Botswana
- Profession: Politician

Peggy Onkutlwile Serame is a Motswana politician who served as Minister of Finance from 2021 to 2024.

== Political career ==
Prior to being appointed to the cabinet, Serame worked as a microeconomist at the Ministry of Finance. Serame served as Minister of Investment, Trade and Industry from March 2020 until April 2021. Ms. Serame was Acting Deputy Permanent Secretary to the President from September to November 2019. Prior to her appointment as Minister, she was Permanent Secretary in the then Ministry of Investment, Trade, and Industry from January 2015 to November 2019.

== Other activities ==
- World Bank, Ex-Officio Member of the Board of Governors (since 2021)
- Multilateral Investment Guarantee Agency (MIGA), World Bank Group, Ex-Officio Member of the Board of Governors (since 2021)

== Education ==
Ms. Serame is an Economist with a Master’s Degree in Economics and a Bachelor of Arts in Economics and Statistics.

== Personal life ==
Serame has a daughter named Dineo Diana Tamia Serame and Kabelo Serame.

== See also ==
- Gaona Dintwe
- Bogolo Kenewendo
