= Moeng College =

Coordinates: 22.678°S 27.612°E

Moeng College Senior Secondary School
- Moeng; Botswana

Information
- Type: Government School
- Motto: Education for excellence
- Religious affiliation: Christianity
- Established: 1947
- Grades: Form 4, Form 5
- National ranking: 32

Moeng College is a government senior secondary school located in Moeng.The building of the school was started by Tshekedi Khama in 1947.

== History ==
Moeng College Senior Secondary School is located in a very small village in Botswana Moeng about 98 km from Serowe, Moeng College was founded by Tshekedi Khama and his tribe the Bangwato in 1947, the name "Moeng" comes from a valley which was loved by Tshekedi Khama's Father.
