= James G. Haskins =

Botswanan politician (1914–1990)

James Haskins

Minister of Finance
- In office 1968–1970
- President: Seretse Khama
- Preceded by: Quett Masire
- Succeeded by: Quett Masire

Personal details
- Born: 1914 Bulawayo, Rhodesia (now Zimbabwe)
- Died: 1990 (aged 75–76) Botswana
- Party: Botswana Democratic Party

James George Haskins (1914–1990) was a Rhodesian-born politician and businessman from Botswana.

== Biography ==
Haskins was born in Bulawayo, Southern Rhodesia. His father was James Haskins from Bristol who ran a coffee business in the Tati Concessions Land and later a trading store chain headquartered in Francistown. Haskins founded the Francistown Chamber of Commerce.

Haskins entered politics in 1948 as a member of the European Advisory Council. He was a member of the Legislative Council of Bechuanaland between 1961 and 1964. He was a member of the Bechuanaland Democratic Party.

Haskins could be considered a spokesperson of the white community in Botswana and an advocate for Botswana's independence. In 1966, he became a member of National Assembly of Botswana. The same year he joined cabinet and held offices of minister of commerce, industry and water affairs, and later minister of finance, of agriculture, and communications. In 1979, Haskins retired from the cabinet and returned to family trading business.

From 1979 to 1989, he served as the Speaker of the National Assembly of Botswana.
