= Alfred Merriweather =

Vicar and missionary in Botswana

Alfred Merriweather, CBE

Speaker of the National Assembly of Botswana
- In office 1965–1968
- Preceded by: Post created
- Succeeded by: Albert Frank Lock

Personal details
- Born: 19 August 1918 Yorkshire, United Kingdom
- Died: 8 October 1999 (aged 81) Molepolole, Botswana

Alfred Musgrave Merriweather CBE, (19 August 1918 – 8 October 1999) was a Scottish missionary in Botswana, who was a member of the National Assembly of Botswana and its first Speaker. He helped improve public health in Botswana.

== Biography ==
Merriweather was born in Yorkshire, and lived later in Glasgow.

He moved to Molepolole in Bechuanaland Protectorate in 1944 to work in the Scottish Livingstone Hospital. His medical reputation allowed him to become medical adviser to Sir Seretse Khama, first President of Botswana. Merriweather was elected as the speaker of the Legislative Assembly, and as the first speaker of the National Assembly when Botswana became independent.

He gained a PhD in Medicine from the University of Edinburgh in 1956.

He died in Molepolole in 1999.
