= Dorcas Makgato-Malesu =

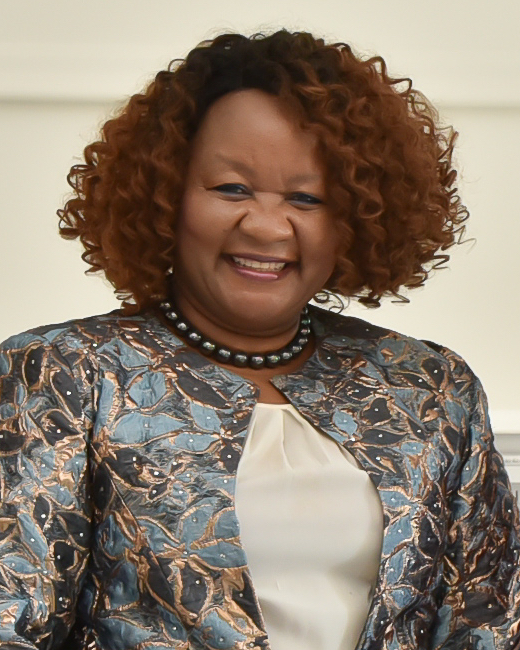
- Makgato in 2021
- Born: Serowe, Botswana
- Citizenship: Motswana
- Education: Sheffield University, BSc Hons in General Management in Catering Systems.

Dorcas Makgato is a Motswana businesswoman. She was born in Serowe, Botswana, and grew up in the capital city Gaborone. She served as a Minister in the Cabinet of Botswana. She was also one of the young hopefuls that marked the 10th anniversary of Botswana's independence with a march past for the first President in 1976. From 2019 she has been serving as Botswana's ambassador to Australia. Makgetho Malesu completed her tenure as Botswana's High Commissioner to Australia in 2023 and served in this diplomatic role for four years before returning to Botswana.

== Education ==
MBA from Ducere Global Business School and the University of Wales. She attended Sheffield University in the UK from which she graduated with a BSc Hons in General Management in Catering Systems.

== Career ==
Makgato was chief executive officer of the Botswana Export and Development and Investment Authority between 2007 and 2009 where she identified barriers to investment and lobbied the Botswana Government to make changes for an improved investment climate, involving greater engagement and interaction with critical stakeholders and the private sector. She used her role as the authority's CEO to overhaul the organisation's working structures and improve its practices which led the company to become one of Africa's most admired investment promotion authorities.

Before joining the investment authority, Makgato worked for Barloworld Limited as director of corporate services between 2001 and 2007 and was also the executive director of the Nashua franchise and was responsible for the strategic direction and performance of the company. Lastly, before joining Barloworld she was Head of the Commercial and Human Resource Divisions of Air Botswana.

Her experiences have been helpful in Makgato's former role in the trade and industry ministry. One of her main goals was to strive to make Botswana an attractive place to do business on a global scale. She hoped to use her position to help the country pursue sustainable industries and trade. Since assuming the ministry position in 2010, she has strengthened the relations between Botswana and its neighboring countries in southern and eastern Africa, while introducing initiatives to reinforce Botswana's identity in the diamond industry and that of the country as a whole. She was the Minister of Health and former Minister of Trade and Industry in 2014. She has successfully led and created women-specific organizations, such as Women in Sports Botswana and the BDP Woman's League.
