= Mudongo Maswikiti =

Motswana politician

Member of the National Assembly from Sebina-Gweta
- In office 1966–c. 1989
- Preceded by: Office established
- Succeeded by: Richard Ndwapi

Personal details
- Born: 16 September 1916
- Died: 2008
- Political party: Botswana Democratic Party
- Children: 6

Mudongo Maswikiti (16 September 1916 – 2008) was a Motswana politician. He represented the Sebina-Gweta constituency in the Parliament of Botswana for 23 years. He previously worked as a primary school teacher and a cattle trader.

== Life and career ==
Mudongo Maswikiti was born in Nshakashogwe, Bechuanaland Protectorate (present-day Botswana) on 16 September 1916. He attended Nshakazhogwe School from 1929 to 1932, the Empandeni Mission school in 1933, and the Tati Training Institute from 1934 to 1937. He then worked as a primary school teacher in Mengwe. He taught from 1938 to 1941, stopping to attend the Serowe Teacher Training College from 1942 to 1943 and the Kilnerton Training Institute in 1944 before returning to teaching. Maswikiti married Boliko in 1949, and he had six children. He retired from teaching in 1951 to become a cattle trader.

Maswikiti sold cattle and hunting trophies, operating stores in Nshakashogwe and Makobo. He founded his own company, the Botswana Producers' Agency, when the Botswana Meat Commission was established to sell cattle to it. He also ran public transport in Francistown.

Maswikiti was involved in the Botswana independence movement in the 1960s. He became the representative of Sebina-Gweta in the Parliament of Botswana when the nation became independent in 1966. Maswikiti was a member of parliament for 23 years. He stepped down from office and was succeeded by Richard Ndwapi. Maswikiti became a farmer until his retirement in 2003. He died in 2008.

== Legacy ==
An effort was made in 2014 to name a street after Maswikiti in Francistown, but the city council rejected the proposal, saying that he was not a significant figure in the city's development.

Maswikiti's family donated 50,000 pula to the Nshakashobgwe Village Development Committee in 2018 to fund the creation of a new youth centre, in honor of Maswikiti's unfulfilled desire to open a library in Nshakashobgwe.
