= Eyes Reokwaeng =

Motswana politician (1916–1989)

Member of Parliament from Kweneng West
- In office 1965–1984

Personal details
- Party: Botswana Democratic Party

Matlho "Eyes" Reokwaeng was a Motswana politician. He was born into the Kgalagadi tribe in 1916, and he became headman in Letlhakeng. While in this position in the 1940s, he refused the Kwena tribe's attempts to gain jurisdiction over him.

Reokwaeng was selected by Quett Masire to establish a branch of the Botswana Democratic Party in western Kweneng in 1964. He was elected to represent Kweneng West in the Parliament of Botswana during the 1965 general election. He was known for his advocacy for the Kgalagadi tribe and his support for directing infrastructure to the area. Reokwaeng was not fluent in English during his career. He retired from Parliament in 1984. While in retirement, Reokwaeng opposed a 1997 constitutional amendment that would lower the voting age to 18.
