= Goareng Mosinyi =

Botswana politician (1915–2012)

Goareng Mosinyi (1915–2012) was a Botswana politician.

Goareng Mosinyi was born in Shoshong in 1915 as a member of the royal families of the Kaa people and the Ngwato people. Mosinyi attended Tiger Kloof Educational Institute as a child. He was tribal treasurer for the Ngwato from 1943 to 1948. Mosinyi supported Seretse Khama in Khama's controversial marriage to a white woman, Ruth Williams Khama. He then supported Khama's claim to the chieftainship against Tshekedi Khama in 1948 and joined him in exile at Lobatse in 1950.

Mosinyi was involved with boycotts against the British colonial administration between 1950 and 1956. He was a founding member of the Botswana Democratic Party in 1961. He became a member of the Parliament of Botswana from 1965 to 1989. He became a member of the Ntlo ya Dikgosi in 2007. Mosinyi died in 2012.
