= Lemme Makgekgenene =

Botswana politician (died 2005)

Lemme Makgekgenene

Lemme Makgekgenene (died 2005) was a Botswana politician. He joined the Botswana Democratic Party in 1962. He was elected to represent Tonota in the Parliament of Botswana in the 1965 general election. Makgekgenene worked to keep the tribal chiefs politically neutral, which brought him into conflict with the Bangwaketse chief Seepapitso IV.

Makgekgenene won reelection until he was defeated by Pono Moatlhodi in the 1999 general election. Makgekgenene died at Princess Marina Hospital on 15 August 2005. Makgekgenene was posthumously awarded Presidential Order of Honour by Ian Khama in 2008.
