= Englishman Kgabo =

Motswana politician (1925–1992)

Englishman M. K. Kgabo (1925–1992) was a Motswana politician. He served as a member of the National Assembly of Botswana from its founding in 1966 until his retirement in 1989.

== Biography ==
Englishman M. K. Kgabo was born in 1925. Early in his life he worked as a teacher, and he was later a secretary to the Bakwena Tribal Administration. He became a prominent political figure after supporting Bonewamang Padi Sechele's claim to leadership over that of Moruakgomo Sechele. Kgabo joined the Bechuanaland Democratic Party (later the Botswana Democratic Party) when it was founded, and he worked to gather an early base of support for the party in Kweneng. In 1966, he began his tenure in the National Assembly of Botswana representing Molepolole East. He spent many years serving as Minister of Local Government and Lands, and he remained in the National Assembly until 1989. In 1991, he was the chair of the Presidential Commission of Inquiry into Land Problems in Mogoditshane and Other Peri-Urban Areas, or the Kgabo Commission. Kgabo died in 1992.
