= Benjamin Steinberg (politician) =

Member of Parliament; for Boteti
- In office 1965–1973
- President: Seretse Khama
- Preceded by: Constituency established

Personal details
- Born: 1920 Lobatse, Bechuanaland Protectorate
- Died: 1975 (age 55) Pietersburg, South Africa
- Party: Botswana Democratic Party
- Spouse: Martha Steinberg
- Profession: Rancher, politician

Benjamin Steinberg (1920–1975) was a Motswana cattle rancher and politician who was the first Treasurer of the Botswana Democratic Party (BDP) and the first White Motswana Member of Parliament in 1965.

Born to a prominent Jewish family in Lobatse, Steinberg became a successful trader and rancher in Serowe before he became active in politics. In 1961 he became Treasurer of the newly formed Botswana Democratic Party and later represented the Boteti constituency in the Parliament of Botswana. In 1973 he resigned his post in protest at his government's decision to sever ties with Israel, a decision Botswana made in response to what was, in their view, Israel's unwillingness to abide by UN resolutions. In particular, the government of Botswana objected to a perceived lack of progress in complying with the 1967 United Nations Security Council Resolution 242 to quit recently occupied Palestinian territory.

Steinberg died in South Africa in 1975, after traveling to a hospital in Pietersburg for brain surgery.
