= Moutlakgola P.K. Nwako =

Motswana politician (1922–2002)

Moutlakgola Palgrave Kediretswe Nwako

Personal details
- Born: 6 August 1922 Serowe, Bechuanaland Protectorate
- Died: 1 August 2002 (aged 79)
- Party: Botswana Democratic Party
- Education: Khama Memorial School

Moutlakgola Palgrave Kediretswe Nwako (6 August 1922 – 1 August 2002) was a former politician and diplomat in Botswana. Nwako served as the first foreign minister from 1966-1969. He was Speaker of the National Assembly of Botswana from 1989 to 1999.

Mout was one of the political architects of modern Botswana during his long and distinguished career of public service, Nwako occupied a number of cabinet portfolios before retiring as Speaker of the National Assembly in 1999. he was also a key founding member of the Botswana Democratic Party (BDP).

Nwako spent most of his boyhood helping to mind the family cattle. At the age of fourteen he was sent for Primary Education at Khama Memorial School. Thereafter, in 1943, he went to Tiger Kloof Institute (old Moeding) near Vryburg, where he completed his secondary education. Nwako's classmates at Tiger Kloof such late associates as Motsamai Mpho, Edison Masisi, Washington Meswele and Quett Masire. With Masire in particular, he developed friendly rivalry as the two competed for top academic honours in the class. Nwako was especially keen on Mathematics, a talent that earned him a nickname "Pythagoras". After completing his studies, he worked in the tribal treasuries at Molepolole and Serowe, before becoming a bursar at Moeng College.

Throughout the 1950s, Nwako was among a group of young educated Gammangwato based progressives who called for political reform as well as the return of Seretse Khama from involuntary British exile.

Like Nwako, many members of this group, such as Monametsi Chiepe, Lenyeletse Seretse, and Gaolese and Kenneth Koma, belonged to the Malekantwa age-regiment (mophato).

In 1952-53, the Malekantwa activists, along with such older figures as Kgalemang Motsete and Leetile Raditladi, came together to form a political movement initially known as the Bamangwato National Congress.

The Congress stood as a new third force in Gammangwato politics between the rival camps of older traditionalists led by Tshekedi Khama and Keaboka Kgamane (pro-Seretse).

During the period, Nwako also began writing for newspapers, especially Naledi ya Batswana and African Echo, using the pseudonym “Tribesman”. Through his private as well as public correspondence, Nwako kept in touch with fellow activists of his generation located elsewhere in the Protectorate.

In 1960, Nwako stood and was elected to the Executive of the Bangwato Tribal Council. In 1961, he was further elected to the new territory-wide African Council, establishing himself as one of the up-and-coming northern Protectorate politicians. Late in 1960, Nwako’s former classmate, Mpho, approached him about forming a new nationalist movement, which would become known as the People’s Party (BPP). By then the Congress and subsequent Federal Party led by Raditladi had failed to attract mass support. In January 1961, Nwako did join a BPP delegation that met the British Resident Commissioner, Peter Fawcus, to protest inequities in the electoral structures of the Legislative Council (Legco).

Ultimately, Nwako was not attracted to the BPP. Instead, by August 1961, he was part of a core group gathered by Seretse Khama to discuss the formation of an alternative movement. Thereafter, one of Nwako’s early tasks was to help bring prominent people from outside of Gammangwato into the organisation.

Nwako helped write the Party’s constitution, which was approved at a January 1961 meeting in Mahalapye. Thereafter, he served on its five men Executive as Assistant Treasurer.

In July–August 1963, Nwako joined Khama and Masire in representing the BDP at the Constitutional Review Conference convened by Fawcus at Lobatse. In the run up to the first national elections, which were held in March 1965, Nwako spent much of his time campaigning for the BDP. In this, he often used a bicycle to move around Gammangwato villages. When the votes were counted, Nwako won a landslide victory in the Tswapong North constituency, whose support he retained for another three decades.

After the 1965 election, Nwako served in Botswana’s first Cabinet as Minister of Agriculture. Thereafter, he occupied a number of portfolios including Foreign Affairs, before settling in as Minister of Commerce and Industry from 1977 to 1989. In October 1966, as Minister of State, he presented Botswana’s case for admission to the United Nations.

In 1989 Nwako retired from Cabinet to assume the role of Speaker of the National Assembly. In 1994, he was succeeded as Tshwapong North MP by the then Vice President Festus Mogae, but continued to serve as Speaker until his retirement in 1999.

In his final years, Nwako was vocal in his belief about the need to preserve and adapt local culture to changing times.

Political offices
Preceded by Position created	Foreign Minister of Botswana; 1966–1969	Succeeded by Edison Masisi
