= 2022 in Botswana =

- Decades: 2000s; 2010s; 2020s
- See also: Other events of 2022; Timeline of Botswana history

Botswana continued to address the COVID-19 pandemic in 2022, including the discovery of the COVID-19 variant Omicron BA.4 and BA.5, with COVID-19 restrictions being relaxed in October. Continued disputes took place regarding the Botswana–Namibia border, though an open border was established in September. The rivalry between President Mokgweetsi Masisi and his predecessor Ian Khama escalated in 2022, accelerated by firearms charges against Khama and a warrant for his arrest. The government also saw controversy for its support of bills that would grant it additional espionage powers and regulate journalists.

== Incumbents ==
- President: Mokgweetsi Masisi
- Vice President: Slumber Tsogwane
- Speaker of the National Assembly: Phandu Skelemani
- Chief Justice of Botswana: Terence Rannowane

== Ongoing ==
- 2020–2022 Botswana elephant die offs
- COVID-19 pandemic in Botswana
- COVID-19 vaccination in Botswana

== Events ==
=== January ===
- 3–12 January – President Masisi goes into isolation after testing positive for asymptomatic COVID-19.
- 11 January – South African singer Makhadzi announces a one-woman show in Botswana with proceeds going to the country, prompting controversy in her home province of Limpopo.
- 12 January – Botswana Diamonds reports that kimberlite found in its South African Thorny River project exceeds expectations, causing its stock to rise by 19%.
- 18 January – The government of Botswana begins distributing COVID-19 booster vaccines.
- 20 January – Members of the Botswana Defence Force are absolved of the killings of Namibian citizens on the Botswana–Namibia border, further challenging relations between the two countries.
- 24 January
  - President Masisi meets with representatives of the LGBT community to express his intention to enforce the decriminalisation of homosexuality.
  - The High Court of Botswana upholds the exclusive license of Fresh Standard to cultivate cannabis, ruling that it was improperly withdrawn.

=== February ===
- 1 February
  - The Parliament of Botswana unanimously approves the Virtual Assets Bill to regulate cryptocurrency.
  - Vast Resources pulls out of a deal to purchase Ghaghoo diamond mine from Gem Diamonds.
- 4 February – The government amends a pending espionage bill to prohibit the tapping of private conversations amid controversy.
- 14 February – Botswana introduces a vaccine mandate for all travellers to the country. The mandate will be repealed the following month.
- 23 February – A shootout occurs in Gaborone when the Botswana Police Service engages a gang of armoured car robbers, killing nine of the 11 assailants.

=== March ===
- 21 March – Tshekedi Khama II and Anthony Khama, brothers of former president Ian Khama, are arrested by the Directorate of Intelligence Service, intensifying the rivalry between former President Khama and incumbent President Masisi. Keabetswe Makgophe, Commissioner of the Botswana Police Service, is also arrested.

=== April ===
- April
  - A trophy hunter kills one of Botswana's largest elephants.
  - A court refuses a request to let a deceased man be buried in the Central Kalahari Game Reserve. His body will be held in the funeral parlour indefinitely as the dispute continues.
- 4 April – Botho Bayendi is appointed CEO of the Botswana National Olympic Committee.
- 10 April – Umbrella for Democratic Change opposition candidate Mankie Sekete wins a by-election for the Bophirima ward.
- 11 April – The COVID-19 variant Omicron BA.4 and BA.5 is discovered in Botswana.
- 16 April – An internet hoax leads to the false belief that Botswana had its first ever snowfall.
- 20 April – The Botswana Media Freedom Committee is formed.
- 21 April – Former President Khama is summoned before court for illegal position of firearms.

=== May ===
- 16 May – Botswana's state oil company declares its intention to build a $2.5 billion coal power plant.
- 21 May – Two people are killed in an accident at a copper and silver mine.

=== June ===
- 1 June – Andrew Motsomi is appointed managing director of Debswana.
- 24 June – The Botswana National Olympic Committee launches the Sport for Life youth sports program.

=== July ===
- July
  - Virologist Madisa Mine announces that Botswana has met the Joint United Nations Programme on HIV/AIDS 95-95-95 goals at the 24th International AIDS Conference.
  - Botswana Diamonds begins drilling at the Thorny River project.
- 12 July – Runner Nijel Amos is suspended from world championship events after a drug test returns positive.

=== August ===
- August
  - Caprivi Concerned Group brings President Masisi and Defence Chief Placid Segokgo to the International Criminal Court regarding the killings of four Namibian men on the Botswana–Namibia border.
  - Botswana halts beef exports amid an outbreak of foot-and-mouth disease.
- 3 August – Botswana's value-added tax is temporarily decreased from 14% to 12%.

=== September ===
- September – Parliament authorises the creation of a statutory media board to regulate journalists.
- 9 September – The Botswana–Namibia border becomes an open border.

=== October ===
- October – Botswana and Namibia come to an agreement on the extradition of prisoners.
- 18 October – Botswana removes its COVID-19 restrictions for international travellers.
- 24–26 October – The 2022 African Tourism Leadership Forum is held in Gaborone.
- 31 October – Tsodilo Resources files a lawsuit against the Ministry of Mineral Resources, Green Technology, and Energy Security in a dispute over license renewal.

=== November ===
- 3 November – The main generation unit of the Botswana Power Corporation fails, prompting national energy supply cuts.
- 4 November – President Masisi receives Saudi adviser Ahmed bin Abdulaziz Qattan in Gaborone.
- 11 November – Orange S.A. launches a 5G network in Botswana, the first such network in Africa.
- 29 November – The first combat death of a Botswana soldier in the Insurgency in Cabo Delgado occurs.

=== December ===
- December – An arrest warrant for illegal position of firearms is issued against former President Ian Khama and other former government officials.

== Deaths ==
- 16 January – Kathleen Nono Kgafela, 79, Bakgatla queen mother.
- 19 January – Polino Baleja, drummer; heart failure.
- February – Kgosi Maburu, 33, musician; complications from brain surgery.
- 4 March – Tumelo Mafoko, 44, musician.
- May – Jaqueline Tebogo Khama, 72, daughter of President Seretse Khama and sister of President Ian Khama.
- 2 May – Reuben Ketlhoilwe, 60, Moselepula ward councillor; illness.
