= 2021 in Botswana =

- Decades: 2000s; 2010s; 2020s
- See also: Other events of 2021; Timeline of Botswana history

Botswana continued to address the COVID-19 pandemic in 2021, beginning its vaccination process through the importation of vaccines. On November 11, Botswana was the location of the first documented case of the SARS-CoV-2 Omicron variant. 2021 also saw the discovery of two diamonds in Botswana that exceeded 1000 carats, becoming the third and fourth largest diamonds ever discovered. In relations with its neighbouring countries, Botswana continued to address violence at the Botswana–Namibia border, and it entered into the conflict in Cabo Delgado in support of the government of Mozambique.

== Incumbents ==
- President: Mokgweetsi Masisi
- Vice President: Slumber Tsogwane
- Speaker of the National Assembly: Phandu Skelemani
- Chief Justice of Botswana: Terence Rannowane

== Ongoing ==
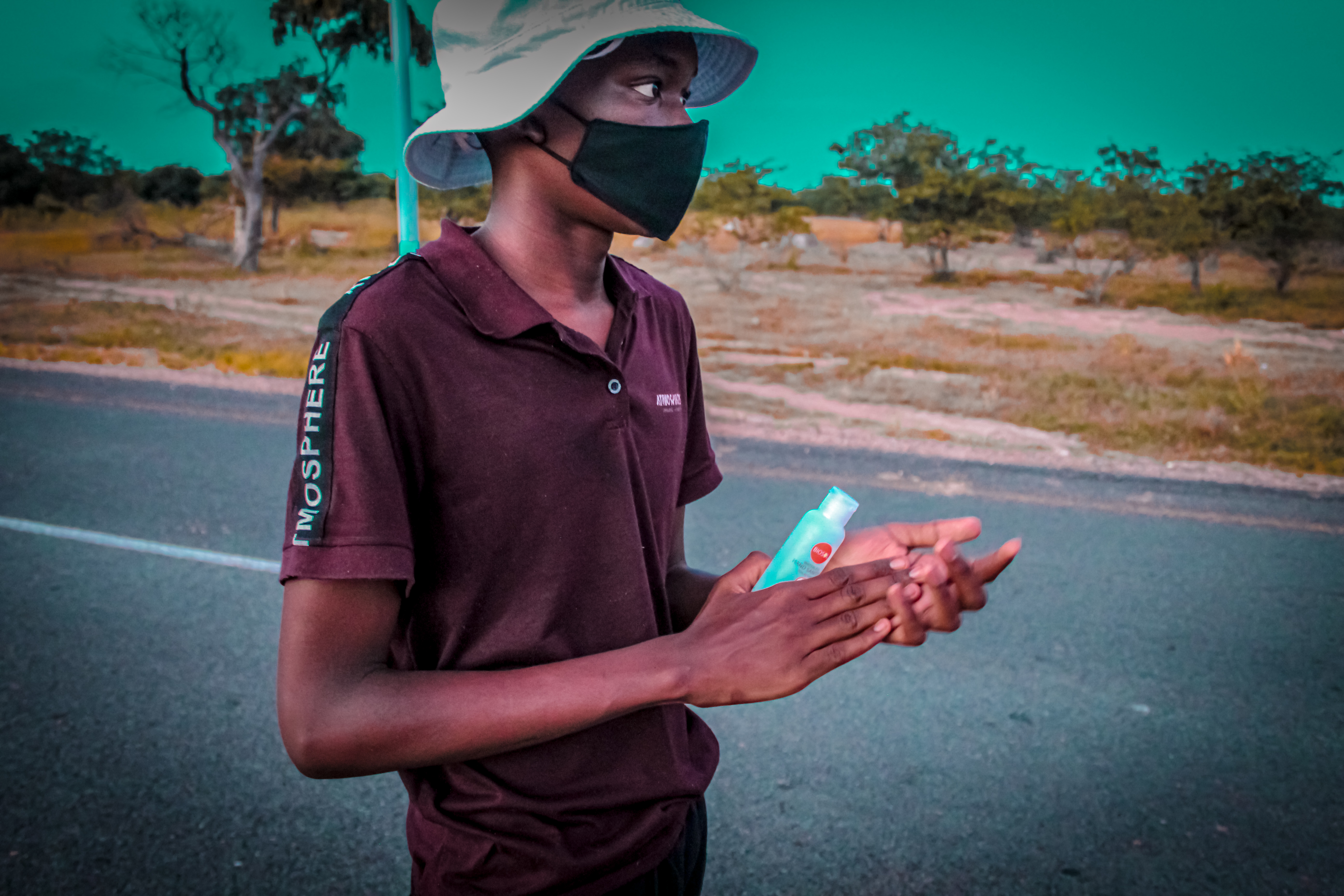
A man wearing a mask and sanitising during the COVID-19 pandemic in Botswana

- 2020–2022 Botswana elephant die offs
- COVID-19 pandemic in Botswana
- COVID-19 vaccination in Botswana

== Events ==
=== January ===
- January – Botswana joins the Chinese Belt and Road Initiative during a visit from Foreign Minister Wang Yi.
- 12 January – Debswana terminates its US$1.3 billion contract with Thiess.
- 25 January – The statutory rape trial of Member of Parliament Polson Majaga begins.
- 28 January – Clicks Group announces the closure of all remaining Musica locations.
- 29 January – COVID-19 pandemic: Minister of Youth Empowerment, Sport and Culture Development Tumiso Rakgare announces a temporary end to contact sport in Botswana.

=== February ===
- 22 February – The Bank of Botswana updates its 10 pula note with the portrait of President Masisi after a three year delay.
- February – Botswana gives reprieve to Zimbabwean refugees enrolled in higher education courses.
- 25 February – President Masisi meets with President of Namibia Hage Geingob in Windhoek.

=== March ===
- 5 March – A helicopter crashes outside of Sojwe, killing musician Sasa Klaas.
- 19 March – President Masisi meets with President of South Africa Cyril Ramaphosa in South Africa.
- 22 March – Botswana agrees to the partnership between the Organisation of African, Caribbean and Pacific States and the European Union.

=== April ===
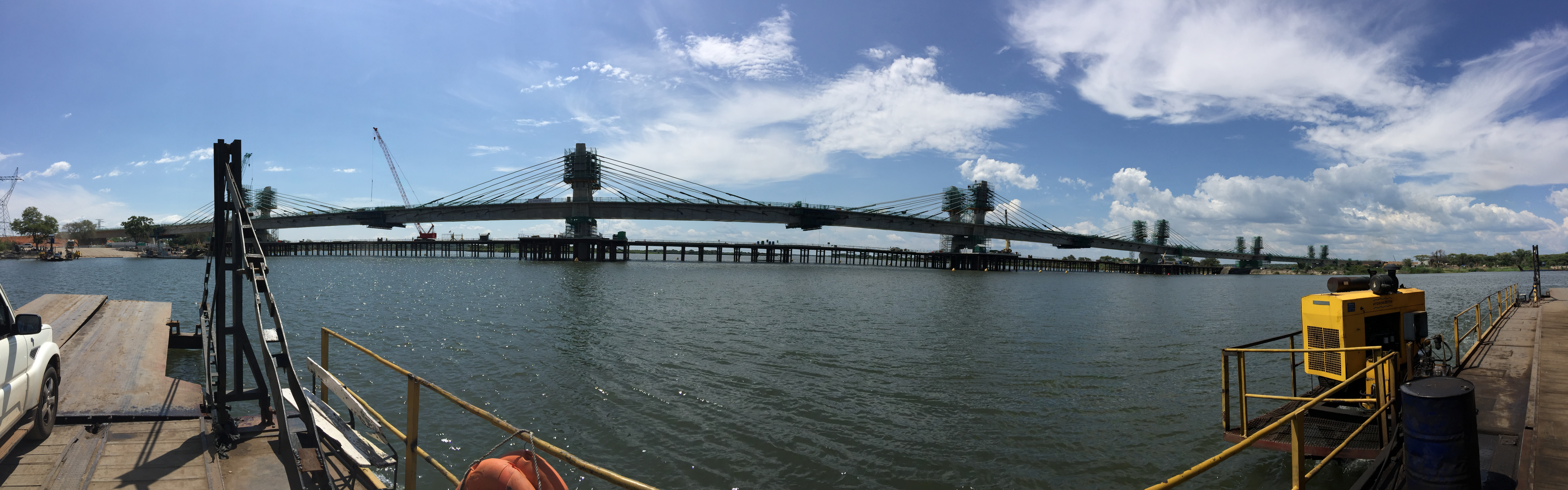
Kazungula Bridge

- April – The DumaTau resort is reopened by Wilderness Safaris.
- 5 April – Goabaone Taylor is appointed as the CEO of the Botswana Football Association.
- 16 April – Botswana restores its hunting season, including licenses to hunt 287 elephants.
- 13 April – A telehealth program is announced in Botswana through the United States University Partnerships Initiative.
- 14 April – Botswana bans the importation of South African poultry in response to an avian influenza outbreak.
- 16 April – Minister of Finance Thapelo Matsheka is replaced by Peggy Serame.
- 19 April – Access Bank Group agrees to purchase a majority stake in African Banking Corporation of Botswana.
- 27 April –
  - COVID-19 pandemic: Botswana announces that it has imported enough COVID-19 vaccines to immunise every adult in the country.
  - COVID-19 pandemic: President Masisi goes into self-quarantine, prompting the postponement of a meeting of the leaders of Southern Africa to address the insurgency in Cabo Delgado.
  - Botswana and Zambia sign a bilateral agreement to facilitate travel between the countries on the Kazungula Bridge.

=== May ===
- May – The Botswana Athletics Association holds the National Athletics Championships in Botswana, hosting for several Southern African countries.
- 10 May – The Kazungula Bridge is inaugurated.
- 21 May – The Botswana High Court rules that the Ba-Ga-Malete Tribe is entitled to the land of Forest Hill, Botswana.
- 26 May – COVID-19 pandemic: Minister of Health Edwin Dikoloti announces government support for any business that produces equipment to assist in fighting the COVID-19 pandemic.

=== June ===
- June – The Central Tuli Game Reserve becomes the first nature reserve in Botswana to use Smart Parks sensor systems to track wildlife.
- 2 June – NMG Benefits is appointed as the manager of the Botswana's Public Officers Pension Fund.
- 3 June – Botswana enters into an agreement with Moderna to receive the Moderna COVID-19 vaccine.
- 8 June – Botswana grants a three year media contract to Steve Harvey, prompting backlash from local media.
- 16 June – A 1,098-carat diamond is presented to Botswana government after being discovered at the Jwaneng diamond mine, becoming the third largest diamond ever discovered.

=== July ===
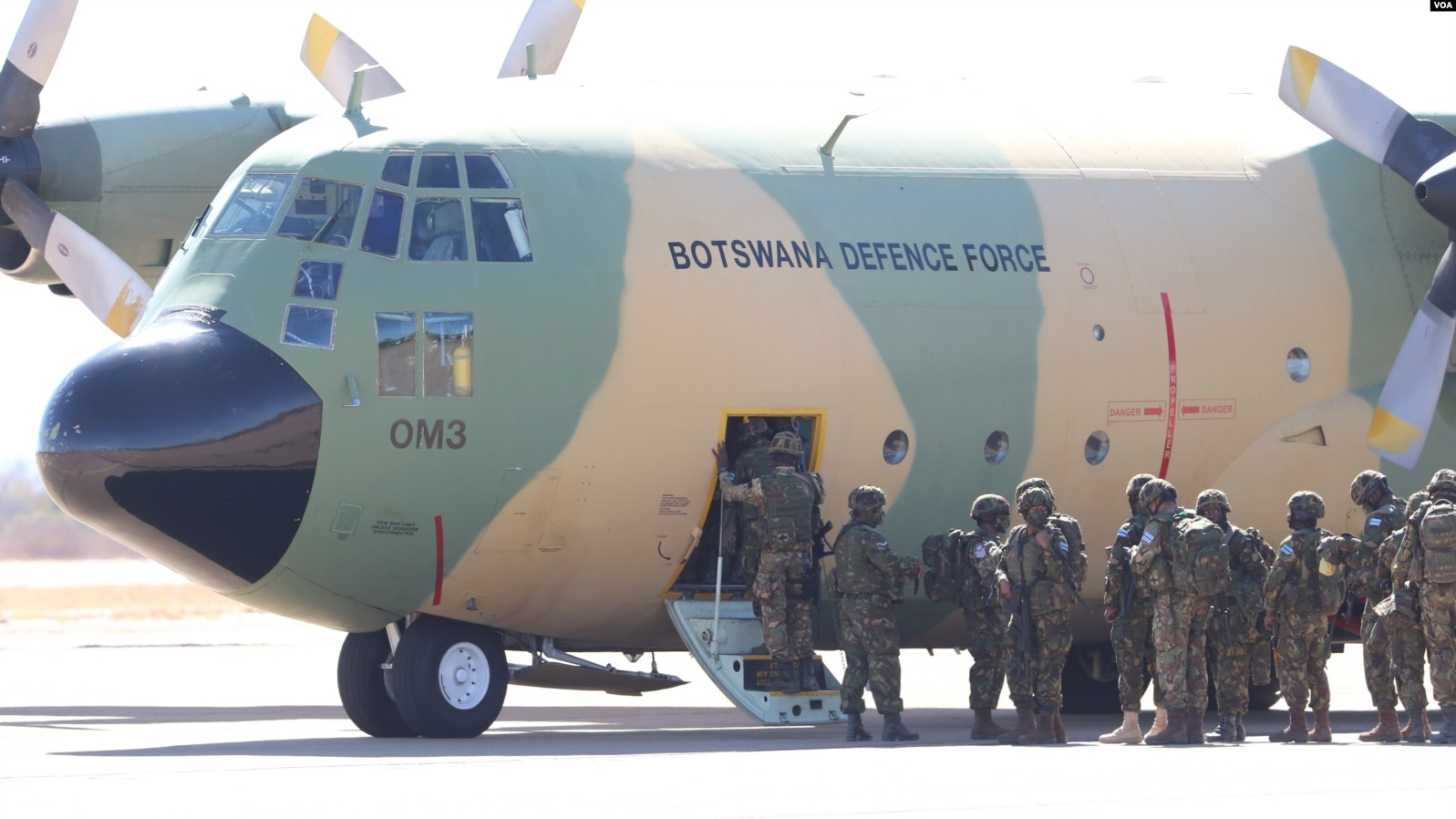
Botswana soldiers board a plane to Mozambique

- July – The epidemic of HfN1 avian flu spreads to Botswana.
- 5 July – Botswana authorises Shumba Energy to create the country's first large scale solar plant.
- 7 July – A 1,174-carat diamond is presented to Botswana government after being discovered at the Karowe diamond mine, becoming the third largest diamond ever discovered.
- 13 July – Botswana begins work on its first iron-ore mine.
- 16 July – COVID-19 pandemic: Schools in Botswana are closed for one month in response to COVID-19 outbreaks.
- 26 July – Botswana sends 296 soldiers to Mozambique to fight the insurgency in Cabo Delgado.
- 30 July – Khoemacau Copper Mine is officially opened.

=== August ===
- August –
  - Boyce Sebetela is appointed by President Masisi as the first Chief of Staff.
  - Okwa Diamonds agrees to purchase the Ghaghoo diamond mine from Botswana Diamonds for US$4 million.
- 23 August – Intelligence agent Welheminah Mphoeng Maswabi is acquitted on charges of conspiring to effect regime change.
- 27 August – COVID-19 pandemic: Botswana guarantees that undocumented immigrants and refugees will be allowed COVID-19 vaccines.

=== September ===
- 2–3 September – The foreign ministers of Botswana and Namibia meet to address violence along the Botswana–Namibia border.
- 6 September – COVID-19 pandemic: Botswana ends some of its pandemic restrictions on the sale of alcohol and public gatherings.
- 7 September – Dickey's Barbecue Pit enters into an agreement to open eight locations in Botswana.
- 9–19 September – Botswana hosts the 2021 ICC Women's T20 World Cup Africa Qualifier in its first appearance at the event.
- 16 September – Botswana and Namibia disband the Joint Permanent Commission on Defence and Security, replacing it with a bi-national commission.
- 20 September – Motlamorago Gaseitsewe resigns as president of the Botswana Red Cross Society.
- 28 September – Minister of Minerals and Energy Lefoko Moagi announces the sale of BCL copper mine to Canadian mining company Premium Nickel Resources.

=== October ===
- October – Botswana joins the International Maritime Organization to facilitate maritime transit through Mozambique.
- 12 October – The Court of Appeal begins hearing a case to overturn the decriminalisation of homosexuality.
- 18 October – Botswana signs a 10 megawatt gas-fired power agreement with Tlou Energy in a move away from coal.

=== November ===
- 10 November – President Masisi visits Paris to speak to UNESCO and French businesses.
- 11 November – COVID-19 pandemic: A new variant of SARS-CoV-2, the Omicron variant, is discovered in Botswana.
- 29 November – The Court of Appeal unanimously upholds a case decriminalising homosexuality.

=== December ===
- 2 December – The World Health Organization certifies that the mother-to-child HIV transmission in Botswana has fallen under five percent.
- 29 December – Goabaone Taylor is suspended as CEO of the Botswana Football Association amid allegations of misappropriated funds.

== Deaths ==
- 25 January – David Bright, 64, football manager (Mogoditshane Fighters, Cape Town, national team); complications from COVID-19.
- 25 February – Archibald Mogwe, 99, politician and diplomat, minister of foreign affairs (1974–1984).
- 5 March – Sasa Klaas, 27, rapper; helicopter crash.
- 12 March – Ismail Bhamjee, 77, former FIFA official, COSAFA president, Botswana Football Association president; complications from COVID-19.
- 2 June – Linah Mohohlo, 69, governor of the Bank of Botswana; complications from COVID-19.
- 30 July – Shona Ferguson, 47, actor and businessman; complications from COVID-19.
- 13 August – Keitumetse Paul, 48, football player; complications from COVID-19.
- 29 August – Jakoba Keiphile, 93, founder of the Eloyi Christian Church; complications from COVID-19
- 7 December – Naledi Willers, television personality (The Real Housewives of Johannesburg); breast cancer.
