= 2020 in Botswana =

- Decades: 2000s; 2010s; 2020s
- See also: Other events of 2020; Timeline of Botswana history

Botswana saw the beginning of the COVID-19 pandemic in 2020. Lockdowns were implemented between March and May, and restrictions continued throughout the year. The previous year's general election was disputed by the opposition, and several cases were filed to overturn the results. Tensions rose with South Africa in 2020 as Botswana sought the prosecution of Bridgette Radebe. Concerns regarding wildlife conservation increased in 2020 as elephants began dying off in large numbers, as well as similar concerns about vultures. Armed conflicts with poachers continued throughout the year, including the killing of four men in November that caused protests in Namibia.

== Incumbents ==
- President: Mokgweetsi Masisi
- Vice President: Slumber Tsogwane
- Speaker of the National Assembly: Phandu Skelemani
- Chief Justice of Botswana: Terence Rannowane

== Ongoing ==
- 2019–2022 locust infestation
- 2020–2022 Botswana elephant die offs
- Attempts to overturn the 2019 Botswana general election
- COVID-19 pandemic in Botswana
- White-backed vulture poisonings in Africa

== Events ==
=== January ===
- January – Botswana receives a 1.4 billion pula loan from the World Bank to fund water supply improvements.
- 8 January – The Court of Appeal rules that a bid to overturn the 2019 Botswana general election may be heard.
- 12–24 January – A hearing is held to investigate the derailment of a Botswana Railways passenger train the previous month.
- 15 January – Louis Vuitton buys the Sewelô diamond.
- 21 January – President Masisi speaks at a panel in Davos during the World Economic Forum.
- 29 January – The Court of Appeal dismisses a case to overturn the 2019 Botswana general election.

=== February ===
- February –
  - Botswana rejects an application of Zimbabwean political refugees to stay after a High Commission on Refugees decision that Zimbabwe was safe for return.
  - Finestar Diamonds opens a manufacturing factory in Gaborone.
  - Vice President Tsogwane speaks at the reopening of the Phakalane Convention Centre following renovations.
- 7 February – Botswana auctions hunting licenses to hunt a total of 60 elephants.
- 12 February – The Gaborone High Court dismisses a challenge against the 2019 election results by Mogalakwe Mogalakwe.
- 16 February – Miguel da Costa is removed as coach of Jwaneng Galaxy F.C.
- 18 February – The Gaborone High Court dismisses with costs a challenge against the 2019 election results by Entebetse Boitshwarelo.

=== March ===
- 16 March – The Botswana Football Association suspends its league in response to COVID-19.
- 20 March – All schools are closed due to worries of the spread of COVID-19.
- 23 March – Botswana closes its borders following the first COVID-19 fatality in neighbouring Zimbabwe.
- 25 March– A 78-year-old woman who was suspected of having COVID-19 died in Ramotswa. A few days after her death, the results came back positive making it the fourth case and first death of COVID-19 in the country.
- 26 March – The government of Botswana establishes a COVID-19 relief fund.
- 30 March –
  - The first three cases of COVID-19 in the country are confirmed. Health Minister Lemogang Kwape says the three patients are in quarantine and had recently travelled to Britain and Thailand.
  - President Masisi declares a state of emergency in response to the COVID-19 pandemic.

=== April ===
- April – Botswana evacuates its black rhinoceros population from the Okavango Delta amid increased poaching and flooding.
- 1 April – Botswana Power Corporation raises electricity tariffs by 22 percent.
- 9 April – President Masisi and the entire Parliament of Botswana go into quarantine after the nurse testing them for COVID-19 is confirmed to have COVID-19.
- 16 April – President Masisi pardons 149 prisoners to prevent prison overcrowding during the COVID-19 pandemic.
- 27 April – President Masisi extends the national lockdown from May 1 to May 7.
- 30 April – The Bank of Botswana reduces interest rates and capital ratios in response to the COVID-19 pandemic.

=== May ===
- 15 May – The Confederation of African Football determines that Botswana's failure to attend a 2020 U17 Women's World Cup match in Morocco due to COVID-19 was permissible.
- 20 May – Botswana's COVID-19 lockdown ends.

=== June ===
- June –
  - Fuel shortages caused by import delays and panic buying prompt Botswana to use its strategic fuel reserve.
  - Botswana grants its first generation licenses to Independent Power Producers to authorise the construction of power plants.
  - Botswana begins dehorning its rhinoceros population to discourage poaching.
  - The Botswana government hires AfriForum to prosecute Bridgette Radebe for money laundering. She sues in response for false allegations.
- 2 June – Schools reopen after 74 days of closure to prevent the spread of COVID-19.
- 4 June – Bishop Frank Nubuasah delivers a written eulogy for George Floyd, whom he had befriended in the 1990s.
- 13 June – Gaborone returns to lockdown after reports of COVID-19 cases.
- 15 June – Gaborone ends its lockdown after suspected COVID-19 cases are found to be negative.

=== July ===
- July –
  - Botswana undergoes a fuel shortage due to COVID-19.
  - Botswana holds a study in conjunction with the Harvard AIDS Initiative to test cabotegravir injections to prevent HIV/AIDS.
  - The African Chess Confederation appoints Mothokomedi Thabano, president of the Botswana Chess Federation, to be chairman of Continental Chess in Education Commission.
- 24 July – Refilwe Mooki begins the Say No to Rape campaign in Botswana.
- 25 July – National Development Bank CEO Lorato Morapedi announces the bank's shift to an agri-bank specialising in farm development.
- 27 July –
  - Parliament begins broadcasting its sessions live.
  - The Botswana Tourism Organisation begins the Rediscover Botswana initiative to increase tourism.

=== August ===
- August – Tymon Katlholo is appointed as head of the Directorate on Corruption and Economic Crime.
- 20 August – A report by Omnia Strategy and Alaco condemns the government of Botswana for its charges against Bridgette Motsepe and Ian Khama.
- 26 August – President Masisi makes several changes to the Cabinet, including the removal of Unity Dow and Lemogang Kwape.
- 30 August – The Trans-Okavango Charity Cycle begins.

=== September ===
- 11 September – Parliament rejects a motion to rearm wildlife officers following an increase in armed poaching.
- 17 September – Botswana allows wives to legally own land independently of their husbands.
- 19 September – Botswana becomes the 103rd country to ratify the Kigali Amendment to the Montreal Protocol.
- 22 September – Minister of Basic Education Fidelis Molao announces an initiative to teach Swahili in schools.

=== October ===
- October –
  - Choppies files a 653 million rand ($40 million) lawsuit against PricewaterhouseCoopers for failing to sign off the company's 2018 accounts.
  - The Bank of Botswana lowers interest rates due to slow economic activity and low inflation.
  - Construction begins on The Fields Mall.
- 8 October – Construction is completed on the Kazungula Bridge.
- 14 October – The Botswana Police Service establishes regulations for responding to gender-related violence and launches a toll-free report number for gender-related violence reports.
- 15 October – Ugandan politician Kipoi Tonny Nsubuga is arrested as an undocumented immigrant in Botswana.
- 19 October – The Botswana Teaching Professionals Council is established by Minister of Basic Education Fidelis Molao.
- 22 October – Director of the Road Safety and Transport Agency Bokhutlo Modukanele announces the introduction of the Intelligent Driver Testing System.
- 26 October – The Ntlo ya Dikgosi passes a constitutional amendment that requires members of parliament to resign if they change party affiliation.

=== November ===
- November
  - Botswana undergoes a gradual reopening of international travel.
  - Botswana signs an agreement that allows it to purchase enough COVID-19 vaccines for 20 percent of its population.
  - A 998-carat diamond, one of the largest in the world, is discovered in Karowe diamond mine by Lucara Diamond.
  - Mfolo Mfolo is suspended as CEO of the Botswana Football Association after the Botswana team is disqualified from the 2020 COSAFA Under-17 Championship. Manager Thabiso Kebotsamang is appointed as acting CEO.
  - Botswana establishes 25 gender violence courts.
- 5 November – The Botswana Defence Force shoots three Namibian men and one Zambian man on the Chobe River as suspected poachers, prompting protests in Namibia.
- 29 November – Botswana hosts the SADC Extraordinary Organ Troika Summit.
- 30 November – Petra Diamonds sells its Botswana assets, Sekaka Diamonds Exploration, to Botswana Diamonds.

=== December ===
- 11 December – Botswana begins an initiative to produce citrus plants.

== Deaths ==
- 24 April – Kebadire Kalake, 72, Member of Parliament.
- 27 May – Thuso Letlhoma, 48, radio personality.
- 2 September – Serara Selelo-Mogwe, 93, academic.
- 8 December – Roseline Panzirah-Matshome, 44, politician.
