= 2019 in Botswana =

- Decades: 1990s; 2000s; 2010s; 2020s
- See also: Other events of 2019; Timeline of Botswana history

Botswana held a general election in October 2019. Though it was more competitive than previous elections, it resulted in a victory for the ruling Botswana Democratic Party (BDP) and won an addition term for President Mokgweetsi Masisi. Botswana saw an escalation in the rivalry between Masisi and his predecessor Ian Khama, with Khama leaving the Botswana Democratic Party to support the Botswana Patriotic Front and the Umbrella for Democratic Change. Following the BDP's victory, opposition leaders challenged the results of the election.

The Sewelô diamond was discovered in April 2019, and two other diamonds, the Okavango Blue and the Lesedi La Rona, were unveiled in the same month. The nation's ban on elephant hunting was controversially lifted in May 2019. Botswana's law criminalising homosexuality was overturned by the High Court of Botswana in June 2019, prompting a challenge from the government.

== Incumbents ==
- President: Mokgweetsi Masisi
- Vice President: Slumber Tsogwane
- Speaker of the National Assembly:
  - Gladys Kokorwe (until 5 November)
  - Phandu Skelemani (after 5 November)
- Chief Justice of Botswana: Terence Rannowane

== Ongoing ==
- 2018–2019 Botswana drought
- Attempts to overturn the 2019 Botswana general election
- White-backed vulture poisonings in Africa

== Events ==
- 8 January – Botswana bans the importation of cloven hoofed animals from South Africa following an outbreak of foot-and-mouth disease.
- 15 January – Former Director of Intelligence Services Isaac Kgosi is arrested on tax evasion charges.
- 20 February – Football manager David Bright is removed from his position as national football coach.
- 28 February
  - President Masisi announces a one billion pula ($95 million) line of credit to Zimbabwe.
  - The High Court of Botswana hears a case to decriminalise homosexuality.
- April – The Okavango Blue, a 20-carat blue diamond, is unveiled.
- 5 April – The Botswana Democratic Party announces that President Masisi is its next presidential candidate following the withdrawal of Pelonomi Venson-Moitoi.
- 10 April – The Lesedi La Rona, a 302 carat diamond, is unveiled.
- 26 April – The Sewelô, a 1,758-carat diamond, is announced.
- 29 April – Botswana hosts regional National Rapid Response training with the World Health Organization at the Avani Resort Center.
- 22 May – Botswana lifts its ban on elephant hunting.
- 25 May – Former president Ian Khama announces that he will no longer support the Botswana Democratic Party and would work to unseat the party's members.
- June – A poisoning kills 537 endangered and critically endangered vultures.
- 11 June - The High Court overturns a ban on homosexuality.
- July
  - The government of Botswana appeals the High Court decision to decriminalise homosexuality.
  - A malfunction on President Masisi's plane prompts conspiracy theories that his political opponents are making attempts on his life.
  - The Botswana Patriotic Front is formed by former president Ian Khama and his supporters.
- 22 July – FIFA fines and bans former Botswana Football Association secretary general Mooketsi Kgotlele on charges of match fixing and accepting bribes.
- August – President Masisi announces that Botswana will provide free HIV treatment to non-citizens.
- 27 August – Adel Amrouche is named coach of the Botswana national football team.
- 17 September – The government of Botswana begins deporting refugees that fled Namibia in 1999.
- 22 October – The 2019 Botswana general election, the first competitive election in the nation's history, takes place.
- 25 October – The ruling Botswana Democratic Party is determined to have won the general election.
- November – The Umbrella for Democratic Change, the Botswana Democratic Party's strongest opposition, challenges the results of the 2019 general election.
- 1 November – President Masisi is sworn in following his reelection.
- 11 November – The government of Botswana orders the church of Shepherd Bushiri to stop congregating in the country.
- 15 November – The Court of Appeal rules that the government may continue distributing antiviral drugs to treat HIV infections following a challenge from Portfolio Pharmaceuticals.
- December – Choppies announces the sale of its South African operations for one rand.

== Deaths ==
- 25 January – Boniface Tshosa Setlalekgosi, Roman Catholic prelate, Bishop of Gaborone (b. 1927).
