= 2023 in Botswana =

- Decades: 2000s; 2010s; 2020s
- See also: Other events of 2023; Timeline of Botswana history

Events in the year 2023 in Botswana.

== Incumbents ==
- President: Mokgweetsi Masisi
- Vice President: Slumber Tsogwane
- Speaker of the National Assembly: Phandu Skelemani
- Chief Justice of Botswana: Terence Rannowane

== Events ==
Ongoing — COVID-19 pandemic in Botswana

=== July ===
- 8 July — 2023 Serowe West by-election: A by-election triggered by the expulsion of Tshekedi Khama from the National Assembly.

== Deaths ==
- 9 January – Lesego Motsumi, politician (born 1964).
