= 2026 in Botswana =

- Decades: 2000s; 2010s; 2020s
- See also: Other events of 2026; Timeline of Botswana history

Events in the year 2026 in Botswana.

== Incumbents ==
- President: Duma Boko
- Vice President: Ndaba Gaolathe
- Speaker of the National Assembly: Dithapelo Keorapetse
- Chief Justice of Botswana: Terence Rannowane

== Holidays ==
- 1 January – New Year's Day
- 3 April – Good Friday
- 6 April – Easter Monday
- 1 May – Labour Day
- 14 May – Ascension Day
- 1 July – Seretse Khama Day
- 21 July – Presidents' Day
- 30 September – Botswana Day
- 25 December – Christmas Day
- 26 December – Boxing Day

== Deaths ==
- 4 April – Machana Shamukuni, 49, minister of justice (2022–2024).
- 8 May – Festus Mogae, 86, president (1998–2008), vice-president (1991–1998), and minister of finance (1989–1998).
- 22 October – Leaname Maotoanong, 35, Olympic sprinter (2016).
