= 2025 in Botswana =

- Decades: 2000s; 2010s; 2020s
- See also: Other events of 2025; Timeline of Botswana history

Events in the year 2025 in Botswana.

== Incumbents ==
- President: Duma Boko
- Vice President: Ndaba Gaolathe
- Speaker of the National Assembly: Dithapelo Keorapetse
- Chief Justice of Botswana: Terence Rannowane

== Events ==
=== February ===
- 24 February – 2025 Botswana floods: At least nine people are reported killed following nationwide floods in the past week.
- 25 February – The government signs a new ten-year agreement with De Beers increasing the former's shares of diamond sales in their joint venture firm Debswana.

=== May ===
- 28 May – Global Venture Partners (GVP) and the Botswana Investment and Trade Centre (BITC) announce the establishment of GVP’s African headquarters in Botswana.

=== July ===
- 4 July – The Top Achievers programme for high school students is scrapped due to Botswana's financial constraints.

=== August ===
- 25 August – 2025 Botswana medical crisis: President Boko declares a nationwide public health emergency due to shortages of medicine and supplies in hospitals caused by budget shortfalls and reduction of aid from the United States.

=== September ===
- 18 September – Collen Kebinatshipi wins the gold medal at the men's 400-metre final of the 2025 World Athletics Championships in Tokyo, Japan, finishing at 43.53 seconds. His teammate, Bayapo Ndori, wins the bronze medal in the same category. Both win Botswana's first medals for the category, prompting President Boko to declare a nationwide holiday for 29 September.

=== October ===
- 1 October – An amendment to the Mines and Minerals Act requiring mining companies to sell a 24% stake in new concessions to local investors if the government chooses not to buy comes into effect.

== Holidays ==
- 1 January – New Year's Day
- 18 April – Good Friday
- 21 April – Easter Monday
- 1 May – Labour Day
- 29 May – Ascension Day
- 1 July – Seretse Khama Day
- 21 July – Presidents' Day
- 29 September – World Athletics Championships Victory Day
- 30 September – Botswana Day
- 25 December – Christmas Day
- 26 December – Boxing Day

== Deaths ==
- 26 January – Gaositwe Chiepe, 102, minister of foreign affairs (1984–1994).
