= 2024 in Botswana =

- Decades: 2000s; 2010s; 2020s
- See also: Other events of 2024; Timeline of Botswana history

Events in the year 2024 in Botswana.

== Incumbents ==
- President: Mokgweetsi Masisi (until 1 November); Duma Boko (since 1 November)
- Vice President: Slumber Tsogwane,

Ndaba Gaolathe (since 1 November)

- Speaker of the National Assembly: Phandu Skelemani, Dithapelo Keorapetse (since 7 November)
- Chief Justice of Botswana: Terence Rannowane

== Events ==
- 28 March – Mamatlakala highway accident: A bus carrying Christian pilgrims from Molepolole to South Africa falls off a bridge in Limpopo, killing 45 people.
- 3 April – President Mokgweetsi Masisi threatens to send 20,000 elephants to Germany, after the nation considered raising stricter limits on elephant hunting trophies.
- 12 June – MMG Limited, a Chinese mining company, announces that they will invest 700 million USD into the Khoemacau copper mine to double production in copper.
- 8 August – Letsile Tebogo clinches Botswana's first Olympic gold medal after winning the 200-meter dash at the 2024 Summer Olympics in Paris.
- 22 August – The world's second largest diamond, measuring 2,492 carats, is discovered at the Karowe mine owned by Lucara Diamond.
- 13 September – Former president Ian Khama returns to Botswana after three years in exile to face money laundering and weapons charges.
- 30 October — 2024 Botswana general election: The ruling Botswana Democratic Party loses its majority in the National Assembly for the first time since 1966.
- 1 November — Duma Boko is inaugurated as President of Botswana after his Umbrella for Democratic Change wins a majority of 31 seats in the National Assembly in the October election.

== See also ==
- Botswana at the 2024 Summer Olympics
