= Daily News Botswana =

English language newspaper published in Gaborone, Botswana

Daily News
- The paper that informs and educates
- Type: State media
- Format: Online newspaper
- Owner(s): Department of Information Services; Government of Botswana
- Language: English
- Headquarters: Gaborone, Botswana
- Circulation: ~20,000 per week
- OCLC number: 12230228
- Website: dailynews.gov.bw

Daily News Botswana is an English language newspaper published in Gaborone, Botswana, by the national government.

== History ==
=== Gallery ===
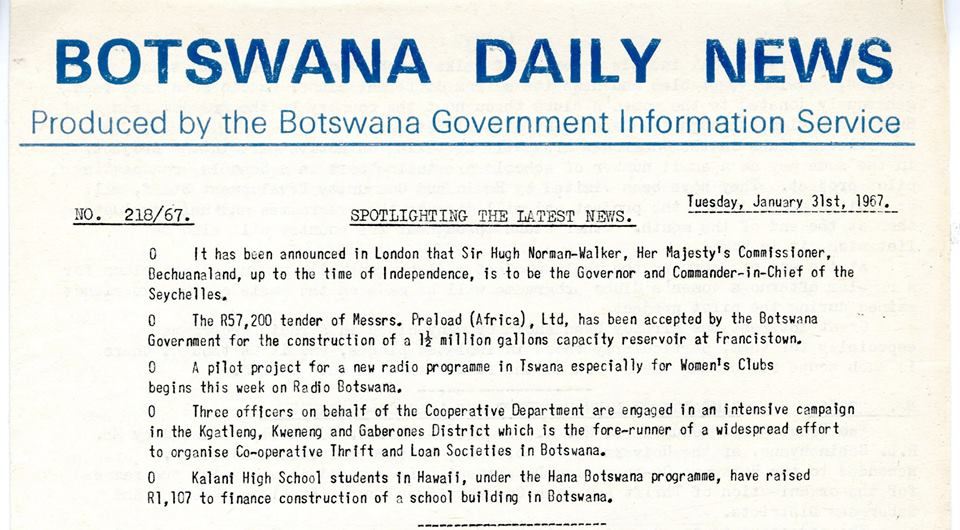

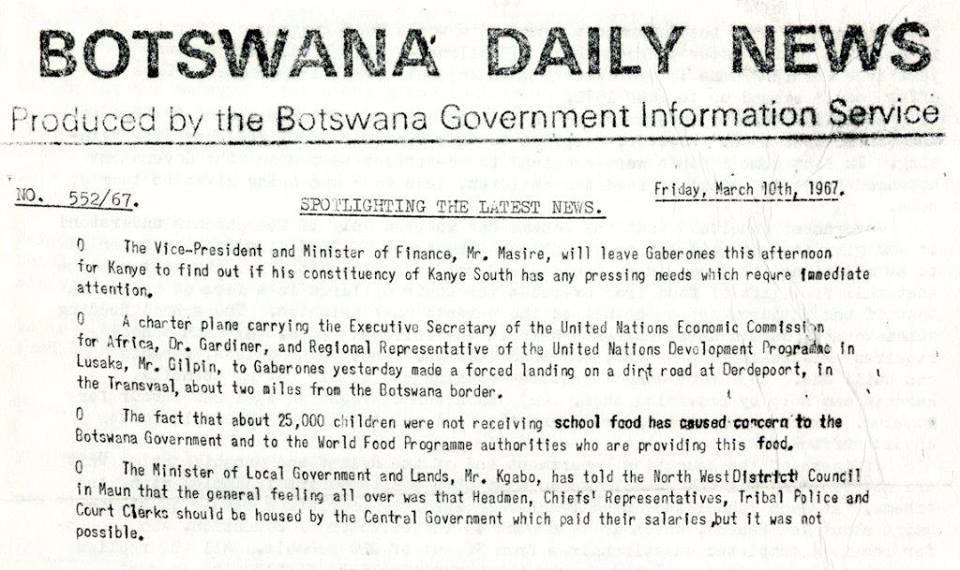

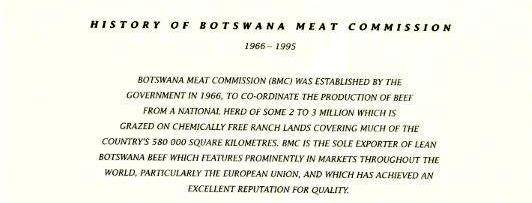

== See also ==
- Mmegi
- Botswana Guardian
- The Botswana Gazette
- Yarona FM
