= Blue diamond =

Blue-colored variant of a diamond

Blue Diamond
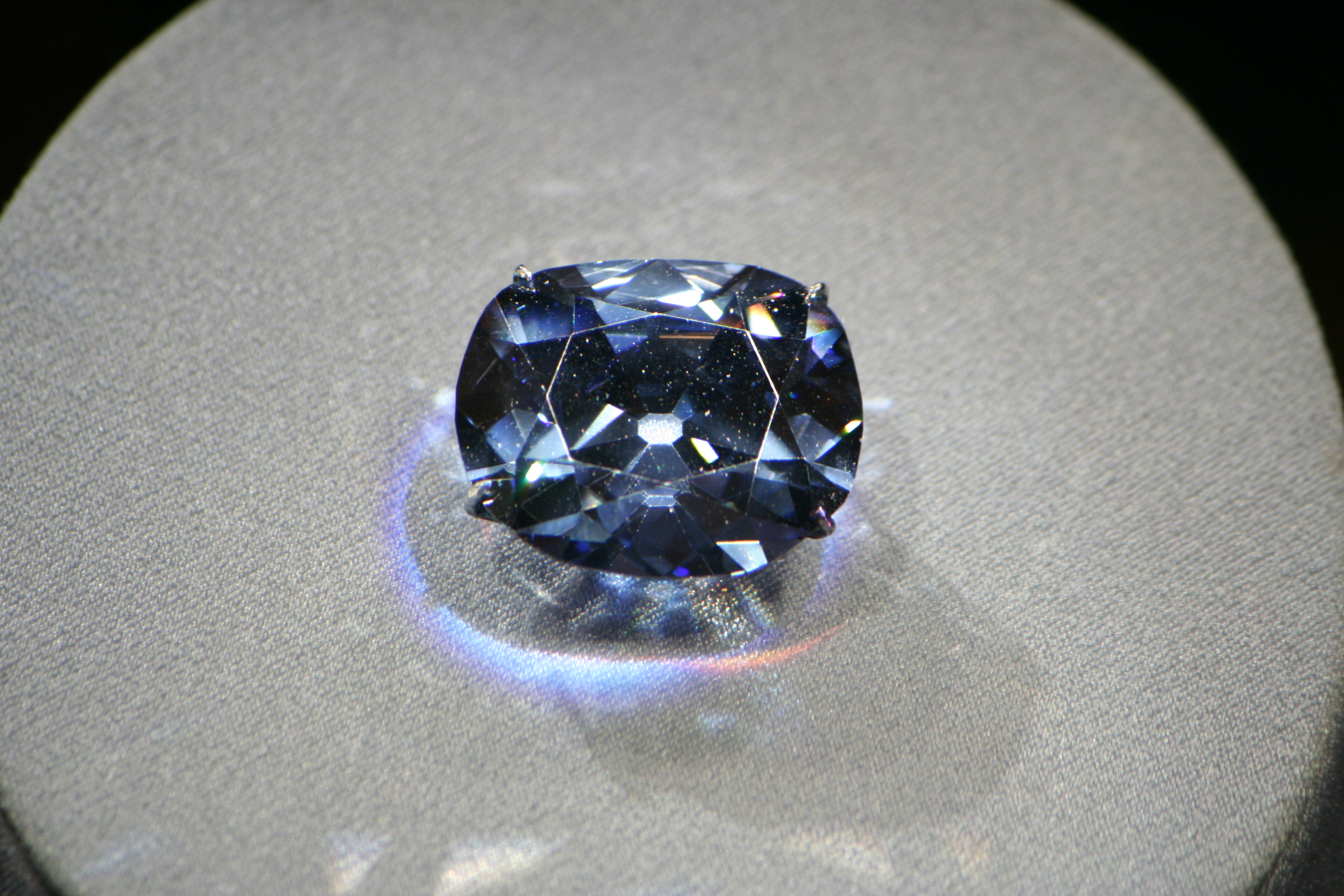
- Closeup of the Hope Diamond, a famous dark blue diamond

General
- Category: Native minerals
- Formula: C B (trace)
- Strunz classification: 1.CB.10a
- Crystal system: Cubic
- Crystal class: Hexoctahedral (m3̅m); H-M symbol: (4/m 3̅ 2/m)

Identification
- Formula mass: 12.01 g/mol
- Color: Light Blue to Deep Blue
- Crystal habit: Octahedral
- Twinning: Spinel law common (yielding "macle")
- Cleavage: 111 (perfect in four directions)
- Fracture: Conchoidal (shell-like)
- Mohs scale hardness: 10 (defining mineral)
- Luster: Adamantine
- Streak: Colorless
- Diaphaneity: Transparent to subtransparent to translucent
- Specific gravity: 3.52±0.01
- Density: 3.5–3.53 g/cm^{3}
- Polish luster: Adamantine
- Optical properties: Isotropic
- Refractive index: 2.418 (at 500 nm)
- Birefringence: None
- Pleochroism: None
- Dispersion: 0.044
- Melting point: Pressure dependent

Blue diamonds are a type of diamond which exhibit all of the same inherent properties of the mineral except with the additional element of blue color in the stone. The Mohs hardness of a blue diamond is around the same as a regular diamond, with a hardness of 10. They are colored blue by trace impurities of boron within the crystalline lattice structure. Blue diamonds belong to a subcategory of diamonds called fancy color diamonds, the generic name for diamonds that exhibit intense color.

== Properties determining value ==
The same four basic parameters that govern the grading of all gemstones are used to grade blue diamonds–the four Cs of Connoisseurship: color, clarity, cut and carat weight. Color is considered the most important criterion for grading a blue diamond and determining its value. However, the most valuable blue diamonds also exhibit the highest clarity grades. There is no known blue diamond with a completely flawless (F) clarity grading, although several are known which are graded Internally Flawless (IF).

One of the earliest mentioned blue diamonds is the Hope Diamond, a 45.52-carat fancy dark grayish-blue which is believed to have been discovered in India but whose first recorded presence was in 1666 by French gem merchant Jean-Baptiste Tavernier, after whom it was called the Tavernier Blue. Its last owner was famed jeweler Harry Winston before he donated it to the Smithsonian National Museum of Natural History in Washington, D.C. Colorless (“White”) diamonds have remained the most popular type of diamond through the millennia, but the existence of this blue diamond so long ago affirms the reality of the demand for fancy color diamonds over the years.

=== Color ===
In gemology, color is divided into three components: hue, saturation and tone. Blue diamonds occur in hues ranging from green-blue to gray-blue, with the primary hue necessarily being blue. Green and gray are the normal secondary hues that can be found in blue diamonds. Blue diamonds are considered most beautiful and valuable when no secondary color is present but are pure blue. However, a pure blue diamond of light color may be considered less valuable than a green-blue or gray-blue diamond whose color is more vivid. The characteristic of color is very complex in blue diamonds for this reason. Most pure blue diamonds are Type IIb, meaning they contain either very few or a complete lack of nitrogen impurities. Type Ia Blue stones contain a secondary hue and get their color from the presence of hydrogen.

=== Clarity ===
As with all diamonds, the loupe standard is used to grade clarity. This means that the inclusions are judged based on the appearance of the diamond under 10x magnification, and not how it would appear to the naked eye. Unlike in colorless diamonds, the clarity in blue diamonds has little effect on the diamond’s value. The exception is when there is an especially high clarity on a very vividly colored diamond. In this case, the clarity can add tremendous value.

=== Treatments ===
Blue diamonds are only considered rare and valuable if they are natural. The definition of a natural blue diamond is a blue diamond that was mined with its blue color already present. Since the 1950s, many methods have been developed to change a diamond’s appearance, including adding color to a colorless stone. These are considered enhanced diamonds and do not have a natural blue diamond value or resale value. Enhanced blue diamonds are not bought with the intention of investment or eventual resale. Synthetic blue diamonds have also been made, using the HPHT method.

== Mines ==
The earliest recorded blue diamond, the Hope Diamond, was discovered in India, in the Kollur mine in the Guntur district of Andhra Pradesh (which at the time was part of the Golconda kingdom), in the seventeenth century. However, blue diamonds have also been discovered in the Cullinan Mine in South Africa and the Golconda region. A few blue diamonds have been discovered in the Argyle Diamond Mine in Western Australia as well, and are offered at their annual Argyle Tender when they are found. It is thought that blue diamonds, unlike most other diamonds, are formed in the lower part of Earth’s mantle, and that the boron creating their blue color originates from serpentinite carried down to the mantle by subducting ocean tectonic plates.

== In popular culture ==
Aside from the fabled curse of the Hope Diamond, blue diamonds do not yet represent a large part of world culture. However, as of 2015, blue diamonds have become the most sought-after gems at auction. This was instigated by the sale of the 9.75-carat fancy vivid blue "Zoe" diamond to Hong Kong billionaire Joseph Lau, who bought it for, and named it after, his young daughter, Zoe.

An anthropomorphic character known as Blue Diamond is a member of the Great Diamond Authority in the TV show Steven Universe.

== Notable examples ==
| Blue diamond | Origin | Notability |
|---|---|---|
| Hope Diamond | Kollur Mine, Golconda, India | One of the most famous jewels in the world, with ownership records dating back almost four centuries |
| Baby Hope Diamond | Kalimantan, Indonesia | Once thought to be a lost piece of the Hope diamond as it phosphoresces red like the Hope. The 7.26 carat deep blue diamond originates from Kalimantan, Indonesia one of the oldest known sources of diamonds |
| Wittelsbach-Graff Diamond | Kollur Mine, Golconda, India | Passed through Austrian royalty until it was sold at auction in 2008 to Laurence Graff and then re-polished |
| The Tereschenko Diamond | probably Kollur Mine, Golconda, India | Originally owned by the prominent Tereschenko family, sold at auction in 1984 to Robert Mouawad |
| Heart of Eternity | South Africa | Part of the “De Beers Millennium Jewels” display in 2000, member of the Smithsonian “Splendor of Diamonds” exhibit in Washington D.C. in 2005 |
| Sultan of Morocco Diamond | Kollur Mine, Golconda, India | Originally owned by the Yousupov family in Russia, eventually passed to the Sultans in Morocco |
| The Transvaal Blue Diamond | Premier Mine (now called the Cullinan Mine), Transvaal, South Africa | Once owned by the Baumgold Bros, current owner is unknown |
| The Zoe Diamond | Probably South Africa | Originally owned by Rachel “Bunny” Mellon, was sold at auction in 2014 for $32.5 million which made it, at the time, the highest price ever paid for any diamond, the highest price ever paid for a blue diamond at auction, and the highest price per carat ever paid for a diamond. |
| The Blue Moon of Josephine Diamond | South Africa | Sold at auction to Hong Kong billionaire Joseph Lau Luen-hung in November 2015 for his 7-year-old daughter Josephine, one year after he bought the Zoe diamond for his 12-year-old daughter Zoe. At $48.5 million, it became, at the time, the highest price ever paid for any diamond, the highest price ever paid for a blue diamond at auction, and the highest price per carat ever paid for a diamond. |
| The Oppenheimer Blue Diamond | Premier Mine, South Africa | Originally owned by the Oppenheimer family, the diamond was sold at auction in 2016 for $58 million, making it the highest price ever paid for any diamond, and the highest price ever paid for a blue diamond at auction. |
| The Okavango Blue | Orapa mine, Botswana | The largest blue diamond ever discovered in Botswana, it caught media attention because its original size, 41.11 carats, was comparable to that of the famous Hope Diamond, whose clarity and purity this newly discovered diamond exceeded. Its weight reduced to 20.46 carats after cutting and polishing |

== Gallery ==
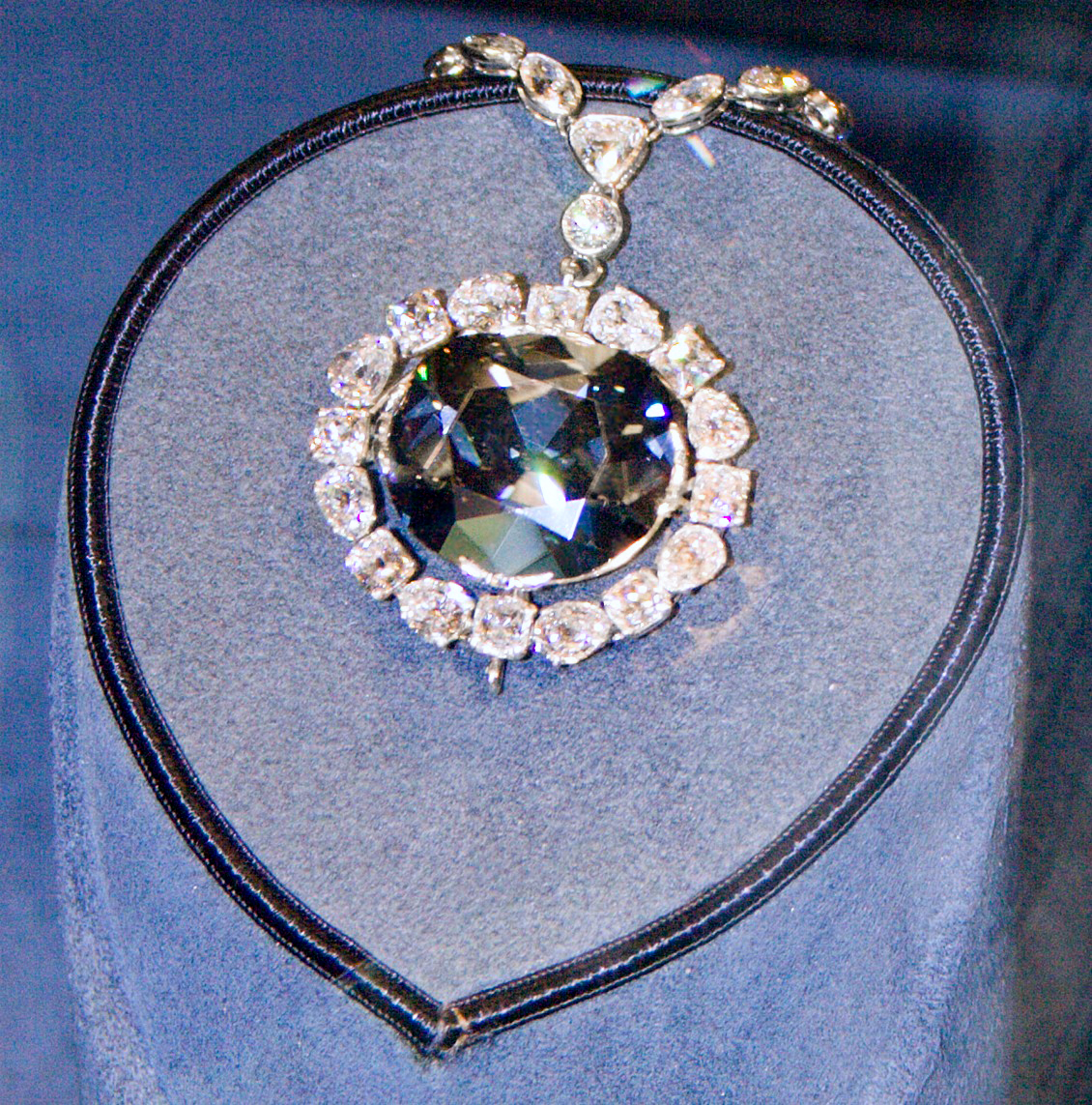
The Hope Diamond

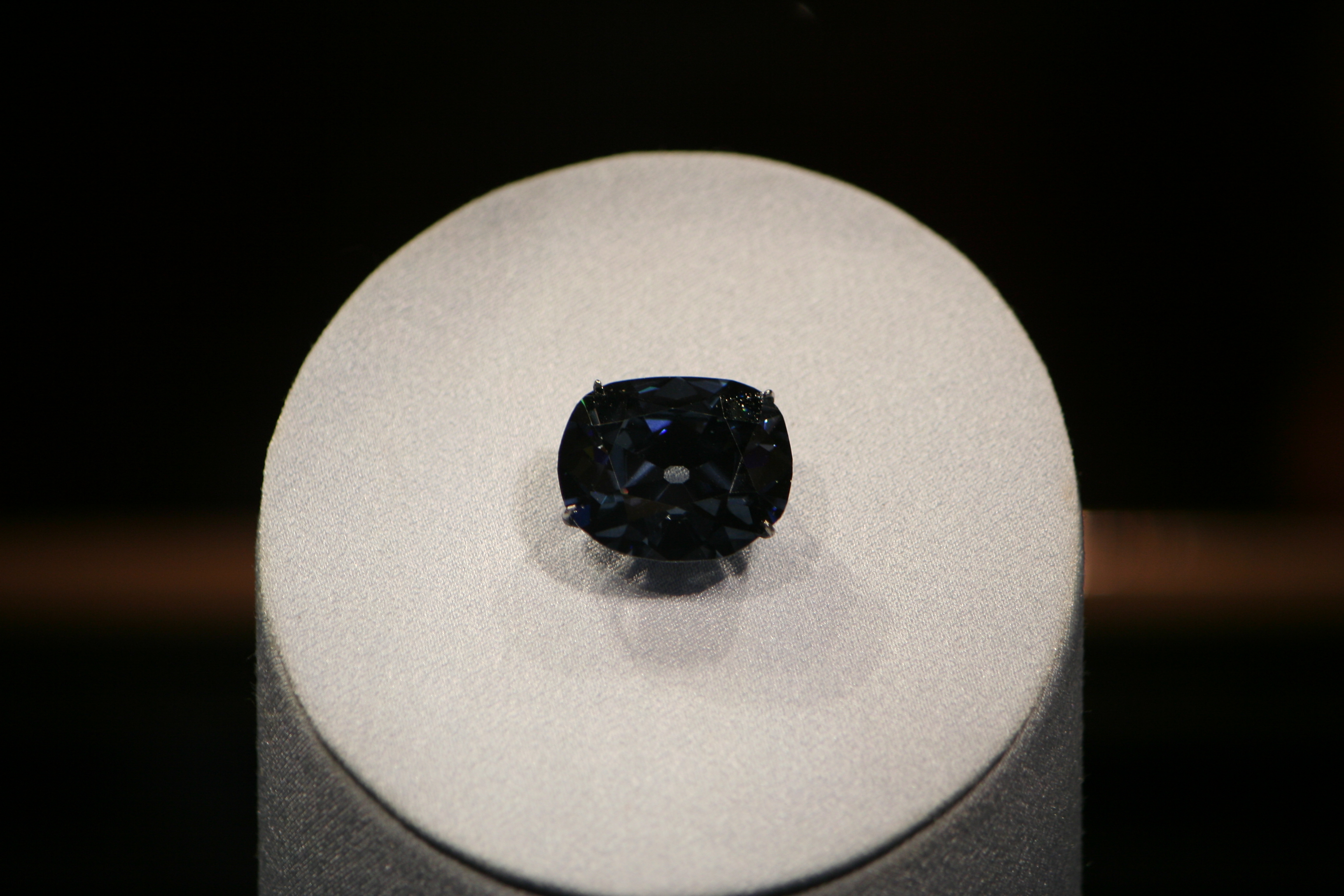
The Hope Diamond without lighting

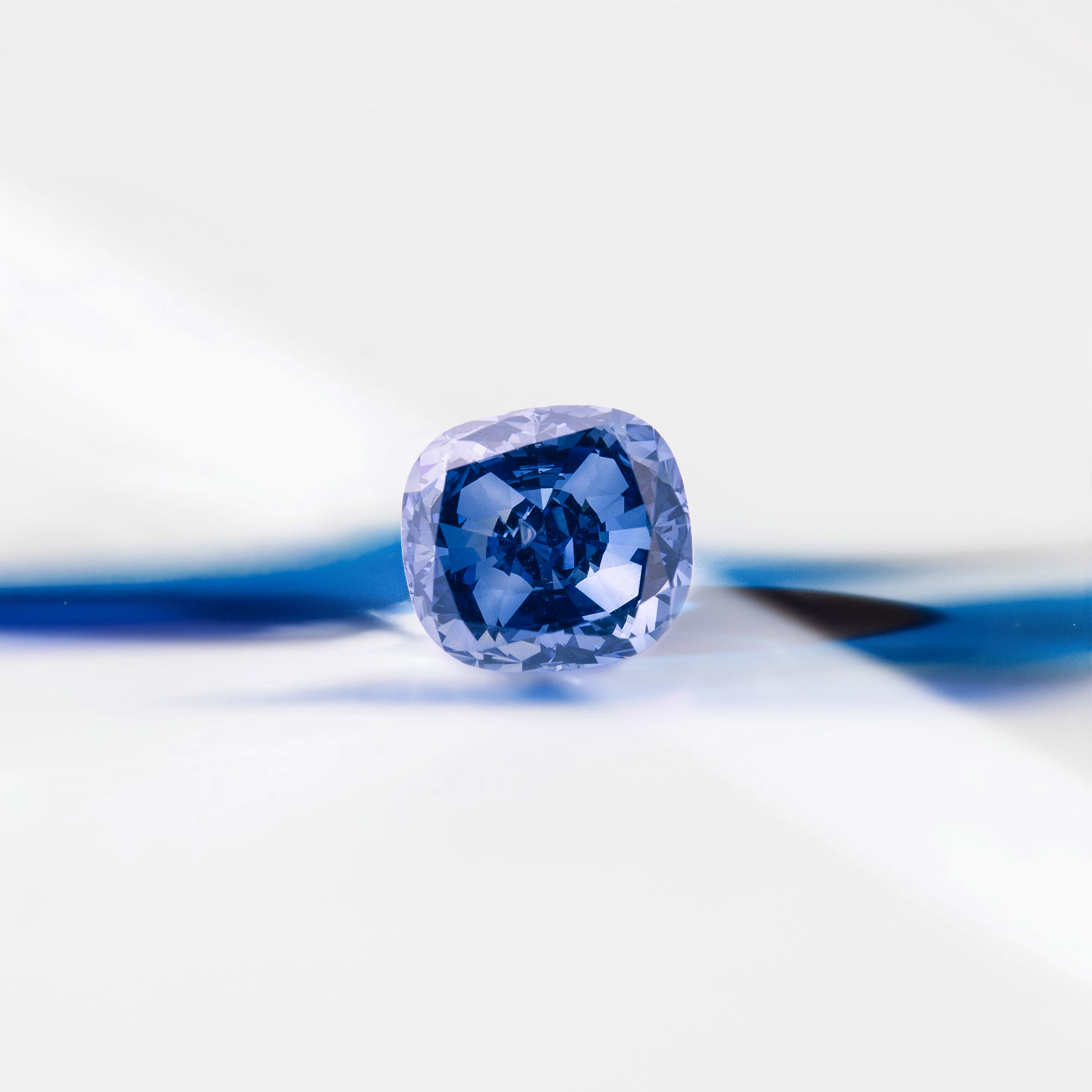
Synthetic blue diamond bracelet

== See also ==
- Brown diamond
- Pink diamond
- Red diamond
- List of minerals
- List of diamonds
