= Tapela and Another v Attorney General and Others =

Tapela and Another v Attorney General and Others is a legal case in Botswana concerning the right of two HIV-positive non-citizen prisoners to access antiretroviral (ARV) medication at state expense. On 22 August 2014, the High Court of Botswana in Gaborone ordered the government of Botswana to provide ARV medication to the prisoners.

== Background ==
The case was brought by two Zimbabwean citizens who were imprisoned in Gaborone Central Prison and the Botswana Network on Ethics, Law and HIV/AIDS (BONELA). The two prisoners were both diagnosed as HIV-positive in prison. They were denied ARV treatment despite that their physical conditions met the treatment criteria under the government's Treatment Guidelines. The government denied them ARV treatment on the basis that they were not citizens. HIV-positive prisoners who were citizens were given access to ARV treatment at state expense in terms of the government's policy at the time.

== Litigation ==
The applicants brought a legal challenge against the government's refusal to provide the inmates with ARV treatment in the High Court in Gaborone. They argued that their denial of access to treatment, and the policy underlying the government's refusal to provide treatment, were unlawful and unconstitutional.

=== Default judgment ===
The state respondents initially failed to defend the application. Default judgment was therefore issued in the applicants' favour in March 2014. The default judgment was rescinded with the parties’ consent on 19 March 2014.

=== High Court judgment ===
The merits of the case were argued in the Gaborone High Court on 10 June 2014. On 22 August 2014, Judge Bengame Sechele ruled in the applicants' favour. The Court held that the policy denying foreign prisoners ARV treatment was unlawful in terms of the common law, statutory law and the Constitution of Botswana. The Court held that denying the prisoners ARV treatment unjustifiably limited their rights to life, equality, and freedom from inhuman and degrading treatment. The Court ordered the Botswana government to enroll all foreign prisoners who meet the treatment criteria on ARV treatment.

The government respondents initially indicated an intention to comply with the Court's order but have since appealed the High Court decision to the Botswana Court of Appeal.
