= 2020 Botswana–Namibia border killings =

- Date: November 4, 2020
- Location: Sedudu, Chobe River, Botswana
- Deaths: 4

On 4 November 2020, anti-poaching forces of the Botswana Defence Force (BDF) killed four men at Sedudu on the Chobe River at the Botswana–Namibia border. They were brothers Tommy Nchindo, Martin Nchindo and Wamunyima Nchindo, and their cousin Sinvula Munyeme. This caused an international incident between Botswana and Namibia.

== Background ==
Botswana has historically struggled to address poaching, and the government had authorised military force with a shoot-to-kill policy to protect native fauna. The policy is controversial in the Southern Africa region, with critics arguing that it presents a threat to innocent civilians. At least 12 suspected poachers had previously been killed by Botswana Defence Force anti-poaching forces in 2020, and a total of 37 Namibian citizens were killed in poaching raids by December 2021. The countries of Botswana and Namibia share close relations, but the shoot-to-kill policy has caused tension between the two governments and their citizens.

In 2018, the government of Botswana hired a Namibian man to monitor activity on the Chobe River while working as a tour guide. The tour guide alerted the BDF after spotting the four men on the Chobe River. A brother of one of the victims who is still alive claims that the tour guide knew the Nchindo family personally before the killings.

== Killings ==
At approximately 11pm on 4 November 2020, brothers Tommy Nchindo, Martin Nchindo, and Wamunyima Nchindo, and their cousin Sinvula Munyeme were killed by anti-poaching forces of the Botswana Defence Force at Sedudu on the Chobe River at the Botswana–Namibia border. Their relatives said they were not poachers, rather unarmed fishermen.

== Aftermath ==
The incident challenged diplomatic relations between Botswana and Namibia and began a long term escalation of the debate over BDF practices at the Botswana–Namibia border. Following the incident, President Mokgweetsi Masisi of Botswana and President Hage Geingob of Namibia spoke over the telephone to discuss a joint investigation, and Geingob received the family of the deceased at the state house. Geingob condemned the shoot-to-kill policy and supported the position that the men killed were innocent civilians. The diplomatic aspects of the incident were complicated by the site of the killings at Sedudu, which had been the subject of an intense border dispute 21 years prior. In response to the killings, anti-Botswana protests took place in Namibia cities including Windhoek and Katima Mulilo.

The government of Botswana announced an inquest into the killings in November 2021. Namibian Lives Matter criticised the action, arguing that it should instead be brought to trial as a murder case under the High Court of Botswana. Presiding officer Taboka Mopipi ruled in January 2022 that the killings were an act of self-defence after determining that the men killed were the first to shoot. Namibian Lives Matter's leader Sinvula Mudabeti condemned the ruling, describing it as a "miscarriage of justice", arguing that no weapons were found at the scene. New allegations were made by the Namibian government in December 2021 that the men killed were forcibly abducted from Namibian territory by the BDF and taken Botswana to have them killed, though this point was conceded by the Namibian government at the conclusion of the inquest. Namibia's Standing Committee on Foreign Affairs, Defence and Security launched its own investigation of BDF activity on the Chobe River in July 2022.
