= High Court of Botswana =

Highest court in Botswana

Coordinates: 25.1927°S 25.6775°E

- Coat of arms of Botswana
- Established: 1938
- Jurisdiction: Botswana
- Location: Gaborone, Lobatse, Francistown, and Maun
- Appeals to: Court of Appeal
- Website: www.justice.gov.bw

The High Court of Botswana is a superior court of law in Botswana. It is based in Gaborone with branches in Lobatse, Francistown, and Maun. It operates above the Magistrates' Courts of Botswana, but below the Appeal Court. The High Court is headed by the Chief Justice of Botswana.

== History ==
Bechuanaland Protectorate was a British protectorate established in 1885, which became the Republic of Botswana in 1966. The Protectorate's legal system was heavily influenced by Roman-Dutch law, inherited through the Cape Colony. Additionally, English common law also shaped the system, particularly in relation to criminal and evidence law. Customary law existed alongside colonial statutes but it lacked formal recognition until later.

The judicial system in the Protectorate consisted of judicial commissioners and customary courts. The High Court of Botswana was officially established in 1938. It was modeled after the Supreme Court of South Africa.

Appeals from the High Court were directly made to the Privy Council. In 1954, a court of appeal was established for appeals from Botswana, Lesotho, and Swaziland. The final appeals to the Privy Council were continued till 1973.

== Judges ==
The High Court consisted of expatriate judges until 1992. Since then, Batswana citizens were appointed to the Court. As of 2024, all the judges on the Court were Batswana citizens.

=== List of chief justices of Botswana ===
Chief Justice		Term		Ref.
(Rhodesia)	Dendy Young	1968	1971	
(Nigeria)	Akinola Aguda	1972	1975	
(Nigeria)	George O. L. Dyke	1975	1977	
(Ghana)	Robert John Hayfron-Benjamin	1977	1981	
(Republic of Ireland)	Aiden O'Brien Quinn	1981	1987	
(Sierra Leone)	Eben Livesey Luke	1987	1992	
(Botswana)	Moleleki Mokama	1992	1997	
(Botswana)	Julian Nganunu	1997	2010	
(Botswana)	Maruping Dibotelo	November 2009 (Acting)	1 February 2010 (Acting)	
(Botswana)	Maruping Dibotelo	2 February 2010	30 April 2018	
(Botswana)	Terence Rannowane	30 April 2018	18 January 2025	
(Botswana)	Gaolapelwe Ketlogetswe	18 January 2025	Current	

== Notable cases ==
- Mmusi v Ramantele (2012)
- Tapela v Attorney General (2014)
