= Mapoka =

Village in Botswana

Coordinates: 20°32′S 27°35′E

Mapoka

Mapoka is a small village in the North-East District of Botswana. Its neighboring villages are Nlapkhwane, Moroka, and Masukwane. The 2001 population and housing census put its population at 1,540.

== History and culture ==
Mapoka has a wealth of unexplored rock paintings similar to the ones found in the Tsodilo Hills.These paintings are found in caves in the Dalale hills that stretch from Nlaphwane to Plumtree in Zimbabwe.

A rain making dance event is held in Mapoka every year at a special place called Gumbu. The dancers, called "wosana", dress in black clothes, don black and white beads, and they dance to Mwali (God) pleading for rain. Like all the villages in North East when it comes to the festive season, the village comes to life. All working professionals who are based in the cities use the holidays to visit their parents and families.

Football is a major spectacle in the village, generating money for the whole village - however, this is typically an end of the year activity where a few local teams are engaged in soccer tournaments.

== Civil society - Schools and infrastructure ==
There is a local police station, a clinic with maternity ward, a post office and several small scale retail/general dealer stores.

There is one primary school and one secondary school in the village. Mapoka Primary School is famous nationally for being one of the oldest in the country and for having educated some of the country's most prominent figures. Past graduates of the school include Botswana's former chief justice Julian Nganunu, government ministers Charles Tibone and Phandu Skelemani, the late Knight Maripe who co-founded the opposition Botswana People's Party, Milenje City Kealotswe, Josia Moswela and a score of University of Botswana academics including Professor Richard Tabulawa, and Dr Badala Tachilisa Balule . In 2006, the school celebrated 106 years of existence in a ceremony officiated by the country's president Festus Mogae.

Mapoka village is also home to Batanani Junior Secondary School. This school has boarding facilities and takes students from several nearby villages.
