= 2025 Botswana floods =

The 2025 Botswana floods were caused by several days of severe rainfall across the country, including Ghanzi, Gaborone and Francistown among other regions. The severe flooding lead to widespread closure of roads, as well as the Botswana government closing all schools from the 19th to 24 February. Overflowing rivers and dams caused extensive infrastructure damage and displaced residents. At least 31 were killed, including 22 in KwaZulu-Natal and 9 in Gaborone.

== Relief Efforts ==
The Botswana Red Cross Society provided emergency assistance to affected families and regions, by distributing food, clean water, blankets, and temporary shelter for displaced residents. The European Union provided €150,000 in humanitarian aid. UNICEF appealed for US$350,000 to support government efforts at delivering life-saving aid and working towards long-term recovery.

Olympic Gold medallist Letsile Tebogo has been praised in him saving stranded civilians in Gaborone and taking them into his vehicle, describing him as "a true man of the people".
