= Knight Maripe =

Motswana politician

Personal details
- Born: April 1927 Mapoka, Bechuanaland Protectorate
- Died: November 2006 (aged 79)
- Party: Botswana People’s Party

Knight Maripe (1927-2006) was a prominent Motswana politician, trade unionist, and nationalist who played a significant role in the anti-colonial labor movements of Southern Rhodesia (now Zimbabwe) and the development of opposition politics in Botswana.

== Early life ==
=== Childhood ===
Knight Maripe was born in Mapoka, Botswana in April 1927, as one of two sons of Tumedi Maripe and Mayaya Maripe.

=== Education ===
Maripe attended his local community primary school before proceeding to the Dombodema Mission School of the Plumtree District in Southern Rhodesia He then went to Tonota, in the Central District of Bechuanaland, where he finished his primary education by completing standard six in 1946.

== Political career ==
Maripe began his political career in the early 1950s within the trade union and nationalist spheres of Southern Rhodesia. In 1952, alongside Joshua Nkomo, Grey Bango, and Benjamin Burongo, he co-founded the All-African Convention. This organization sought to unify disparate nationalist factions, though it was short-lived due to internal leadership disputes. Maripe subsequently engaged with the Bulawayo branch of the Bantu Congress and the Southern Rhodesia African National Congress (SRANC). In 1957, Maripe and Nkomo met with Seretse Khama in Serowe to discuss establishing a Bechuanaland Congress dedicated to the liberation of the territory.

He eventually became the president of the Botswana People's Party (BPP) in 1982, but the party lost many followers under his leadership before he retired in 1999.

== Sources ==
- Tutwane, Letshwiti (17 November 2006). "Botswana: Tribute to Knight Tt Maripe". Mmegi via allAfrica.
- Barei, Geoffrey (20 April 2009). Ness, Immanuel (ed.). The International Encyclopedia of Revolution and Protest (1 ed.). Wiley. doi:10.1002/9781405198073.wbierp0974. ISBN 978-1-4051-8464-9.
- Ndulama Anthony, Morima (18 April 2016). "Remembering the unwanted: Dr. Knight Maripe". The Weekend Post. Archived from the original on 2 October 2023.
- Chakalisa, Dube (4 April 2013). "Maripe's son jostles for BPP presidency". Mmegi Online. Archived from the original on 4 July 2026.
