= 2023 Serowe West by-election =

Botswana parliamentary by-election

- 8 July 2023

Serowe West constituency
- Turnout: 44.9% (▼38.3 pp)
	First party	Second party
	BPF	BDP
Candidate	Onalepelo Kedikilwe	Moemedi Dijeng
Party	BPF	BDP
Popular vote	2,933	1,266
Percentage	66.9%	28.9%
Swing	▲11.5pp	▼1.4pp
- Boundary of Serowe West constituency
MP before election
Tshekedi Khama II
BPF
Elected MP
Onalepelo Kedikilwe
BPF

A by-election for the Botswana parliamentary constituency of Serowe West was held on 8 July 2023. The vacancy was caused by the expulsion on 21 April 2023 of the incumbent Member of Parliament (MP), Tshekedi Khama of the BPF, following his absence from the minimum required two consecutive meetings of the same session to trigger a by-election per the Standing Orders of the National Assembly.

The election was won by Onalepelo Kedikilwe of the Botswana Patriotic Front. The BPF's majority of 25.1 pp in the 2019 general election was increased to a majority of 38.0 pp in this by-election, further consolidating the BPF's hold on the constituency. This result makes it the highest result achieved by an opposition party in the constituency, breaking the previous 2019 record.

== Background ==
=== Constituency ===
Serowe West lies in the Central District and is primarily rural, with the main settlement being the village of Serowe. The constituency is part of the three historically safe BDP seats that flipped to the BPF and had an average swing of 76.7 percentage points towards the BPF. This shift can be attributed to the fact that the BaNgwato tribe, of which the Khama family is the royal family, resides in this constituency and the surrounding Serowe North and Serowe South constituencies. Prior to Ian and Tshekedi Khama's departure from the BDP, the constituency consistently voted for the party by significant margins. However, following the fallout between Ian Khama and President Mokgweetsi Masisi, Khama encouraged people in the Serowe region to vote for the newly formed BPF, and this message strongly resonated with the locals.

Tshekedi first became an MP for Serowe West in 2008 during a by-election that took place when his brother, Ian Khama, became the President of Botswana. Gomolemo Motswaledi initially expressed interest in contesting the constituency but was persuaded by the party to step aside for Tshekedi. Since then, Tshekedi was re-elected in the general elections of 2009, 2014, and 2019. In 2019, he became the first opposition candidate to win the constituency, breaking the ruling party's stronghold on the seat since independence in 1966. The constituency was previously represented by Seretse Khama, the founding President of Botswana and the father of both Ian and Tshekedi, from 1965 to 1974.

=== Trigger ===
On 21 March 2022, Khama, the younger brother of former president Ian Khama, along with his twin brother Anthony and wife Thea, were arrested by the Directorate of Intelligence and Security (DIS) for alleged corrupt deals involving their company, Seleka Springs. Following their arrest, they fled to South Africa to meet Ian, who was in self-imposed exile at the time of the by-election after evading the confiscation of illegally possessed firearms.

According to Standing Order 16.2 of the National Assembly of Botswana, a Member of Parliament's (MP) seat becomes vacant if they are absent from the Assembly for two consecutive meetings during the same session without prior written permission from the Speaker:

For the purposes of the Constitution it is hereby prescribed that the seat of any Member of Parliament (MP) shall become vacant if, without the leave of the Speaker obtained in writing before the end of the meetings referred to in this paragraph, that Member is absent from the Assembly for two consecutive meetings occurring during the same session.

— Standing Order 16.2, National Assembly of Botswana

Having met the required criteria, Tshekedi Khama's seat in Serowe West was declared vacant on 21 April 2023 by the acting Speaker at the time, Pono Moatlhodi. Prior to his expulsion, Tshekedi's last virtual attendance in parliament was during the winter (July-August) meeting of 2022. He failed to participate in the proceedings after the resumption of physical attendance in November 2022.

== Candidates ==
=== BPF primary ===
==== Nominee ====
- Onalepelo Kedikilwe

==== Eliminated in primary ====
- James Kgalajwe
- Gaotilwe Omphile
- Mokgobolelo Mokgobelelo
- Mmaletlhare Kgosikhumo
- Monamodi Bagwasi
- Chimbidzani Chimidza

==== Results ====
Botswana Patriotic Front primary results
Party	Candidate	Votes	%
BPF	Onalepelo Kedikilwe	443	44.1
BPF	Gaotilwe Omphile	276	27.5
BPF	James Kgalajwe	117	11.6
BPF	Mokgobolelo Mokgobelelo	73	7.3
BPF	Mmaletlhare Kgosikhumo	66	6.6
BPF	Monamodi Bagwasi	22	2.2
BPF	Chimbidzani Chimidza	8	0.8
Total votes		1,005	100.0

The two other parties, the BDP and the BCP, did not hold primaries. The BDP nominated Moemedi Dijeng as the party's candidate whilst the BCP nominated Sebusiso Ngwenya.

== Results ==
By-election 2023: Serowe West
Party	Candidate	Votes	%	±%
BPF	Onalepelo Kedikilwe	2,933	66.90	+11.53
BDP	Moemedi Dijeng	1,266	28.88	−1.43
BCP	Sebusiso Ngwenya	103	2.35	N/A
Independent	Kefilwe Koboto	82	1.87	N/A
Margin of victory		1,667	38.02	+12.96
Turnout		4,422	~44.99	~−35.74
BPF hold		Swing	+6.48	

== Previous result ==
General election 2019: Serowe West
Party	Candidate	Votes	%	±%
BPF	Tshekedi Khama	4,394	55.37	N/A
BDP	Moemedi Dijeng	2,405	30.31	−48.26
UDC	Rolent Gambule	749	9.44	−4.35
AP	Leremela Bogosing	387	4.88	N/A
Margin of victory		1,989	25.06	N/A
Total valid votes		7,935	96.88	−1.86
Rejected ballots		256	3.12	+1.86
Turnout		7,935	80.73	−1.13
Registered electors		9,829		
BPF hold		Swing	+51.82	
