= Okavango Blue =

Blue diamond

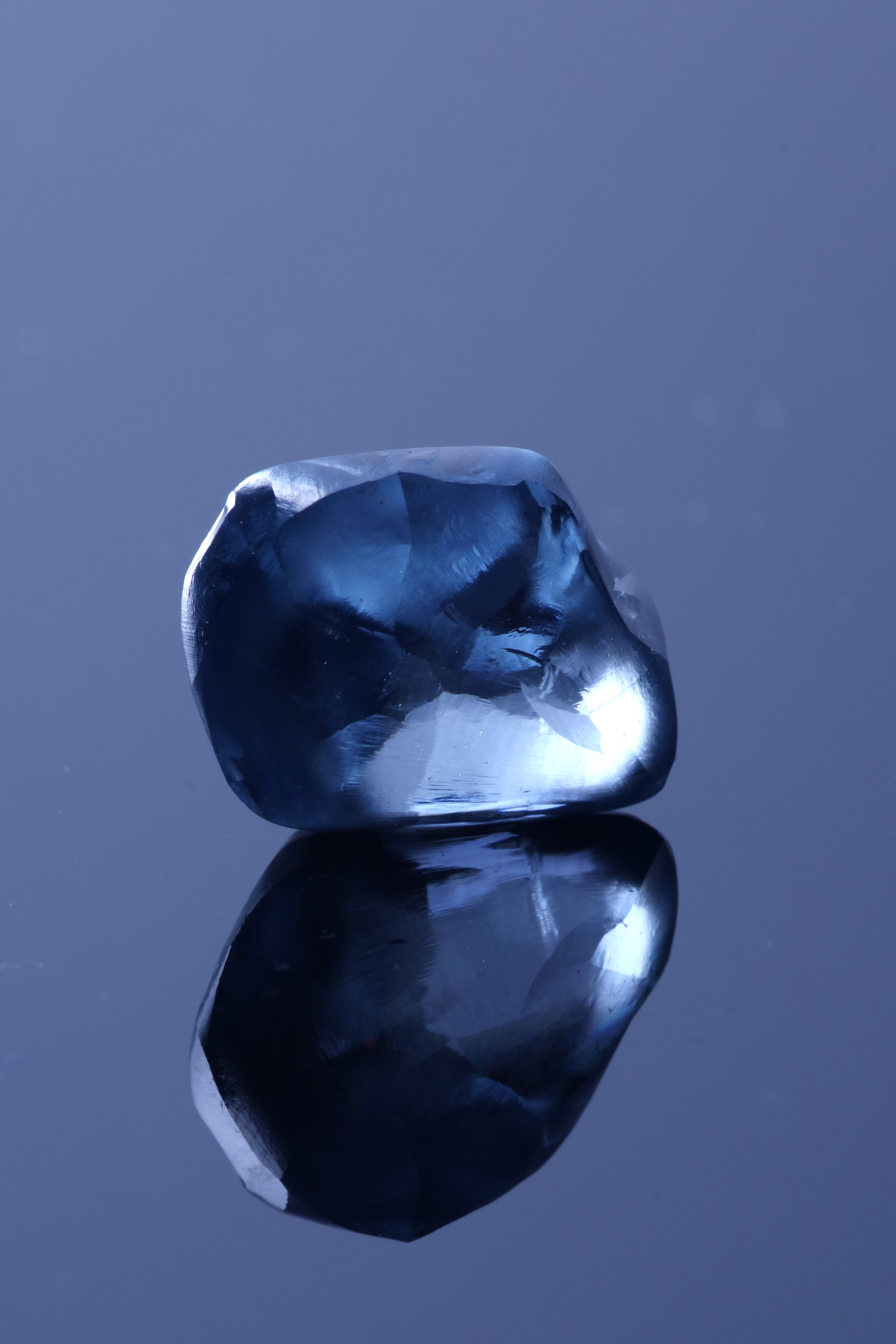
The Okavango Blue, rough

The Okavango Blue is a 20.46 carat blue diamond of exceptional clarity.

The Okavango Blue originated from the Orapa diamond mine in Botswana. The original stone was found in May 2018, weighing 41.11 carat, and was cut in an oval shape. The diamond is classified as a Type IIb "fancy blue" diamond, and was graded by the Gemological Institute of America (GIA) as "Very, Very Slightly Included", or VVS2. The stone was unveiled in April 2019, and is the largest ever blue diamond found in the country. The stone was anticipated to be sold in November 2019.

The "nearly flawless" Okavango Blue Diamond went on public exhibition for the first time in 2022 at the American Museum of Natural History.

== See also ==
- List of diamonds
