= Botswana Red Cross Society =

Organization

- Founded: 1968
- Type: Non-profit organisation
- Purpose: Humanitarian Aid
- Location: Botswana
- Affiliations: International Committee of the Red Cross; International Federation of Red Cross and Red Crescent Societies
- Website: http://www.botswanaredcross.org.bw

The Botswana Red Cross Society, also known as LRC, was founded in 1968. It has its headquarters in Gaborone, Botswana.
