= Rediscover Botswana =

Botswana tourism initiative

- Date: July 27 – August 22, 2020
- Duration: 26 days
- Type: Tourism campaign
- Organized by: Thalefang Charles; Sonny Serite

Rediscover Botswana was a domestic tourism campaign that ran in Botswana from July 27 to August 22, 2020. It encompassed an 8,000-kilometer (5,000-mile) tour across various tourist attractions in Botswana. The event was organised and hosted by media personalities Thalefang Charles and Sonny Serite, and it was sponsored by the Botswana Tourism Organisation with support from several tourism associations. The tour began at the Matsieng Footprints and ended at the Dikgosi monuments in Gaborone. Sites were selected to demonstrate diversity among tourist destinations, including "national parks, heritage sites, cultural offerings, and other sites" at various budgets.

Rediscover Botswana was carried out in response to the COVID-19 pandemic and the resulting decline of international tourism. It was intended to spread awareness of notable places in Botswana and educate citizens about how to best travel domestically. Tourism has been a significant aspect of the Botswana economy prior to the COVID-19 pandemic, and the Rediscover Botswana campaign sought to prevent some of the financial losses associated with the decline in tourism. The campaign was well received and is believed to have contributed to domestic tourist bookings.

Charles listed the most significant visits of the tour as the Kgalagadi Transfrontier Park, the Gcwihaba caves, the Boro and Thamalakane rivers, AfroBotho, the Moremi Game Reserve, and the Makgadikgadi Pan.
