= COVID-19 vaccination in Botswana =

Immunisation programme against COVID-19 in Botswana

- Date: March 8, 2021 – present
- Time: (GMT +2)
- Location: Botswana
- Cause: COVID-19 pandemic
- Target: COVID-19
- Budget: $10 Million
- Organised by: Ministry of Health and Wellness
- Participants: 150,019 total doses administered (7 June 2021): 150,019 people with at least 1 dose administered; 0 people fully vaccinated
- Website: Registration Portal

COVID-19 vaccination in Botswana is an ongoing immunisation campaign against severe acute respiratory syndrome coronavirus 2 (SARS-CoV-2), the virus that causes coronavirus disease 2019 (COVID-19), in response to the ongoing pandemic in the country.

Mass vaccination started on 26 March 2021, initially with AstraZeneca's Covishield vaccine. As of 7 June 2021, Botswana has administered 150,019 doses.

== Background ==
=== Vaccines On Order ===
Vaccine name	Quantity	Doses Arrived	Approval
Pfizer-BioNTech	101,790	101,790	Approved
CoronaVac	TBA	200,000	Approved
Covaxin	166,600	66,600	Approved
Janssen	1,200,000	0	Approved
Moderna	500,000	0	Approved
Oxford-AstraZeneca	38,400	38,400	Approved

== History ==
=== Timeline ===
==== February 2021 ====
In February, Botswana spent 10 million dollars on purchasing vaccines.

==== March 2021 ====
Start of vaccinations of those aged 55 and older (phase 1) on 26 March, initially with 30,000 doses of Covishield donated by India and 33,600 doses purchased through the COVAX facility.

==== April 2021 ====
In the first four weeks 47,160 persons received their first inoculation. A week later, on 30 April, the number of vaccinated persons had increased to 49,882.

==== May 2021 ====
49,959 persons had received their first inoculation by 3 May; 53,375 by 7 May; and 142,864 by 28 May.

On 29 May Botswana received 38,400 doses of the Oxford-AstraZeneca vaccine through COVAX, facilitated by UNICEF Botswana.

==== June 2021 ====
On 3 June Botswana received 19,890 doses of the Pfizer-BioNTech vaccine through COVAX. A supply agreement with Moderna was announced.

On 24 June Botswana received 200,000 doses of the CoronaVac vaccine. By the end of the month 91,482 persons had been fully vaccinated.

==== July 2021 ====
Vaccination of 55-year-olds and older resumed on 5 July. Health ministry officials announced their intention to extend vaccination to those aged 30 to 54 (phase 2) at the end of July.

On 16 July, the Ministry of Health and Wellness reported a shortfall of 15,000 doses of the Oxford-AstraZeneca vaccine, initially foreseen for delivery in early June. To remedy the shortfall and ensure that those already vaccinated once with Oxford-AstraZeneca received their second inoculation within 12 weeks of the first, the Ministry recommended using the Moderna or Pfizer-BioNTech vaccines for the second dose in case Oxford-AstraZeneca was unavailable.

On 30 July, the Minister for Health and Wellness informed that out of more than two million vaccine doses on order, only 282,890 doses had been delivered so far. By the end of the month 127,362 persons had been fully vaccinated.

==== August 2021 ====
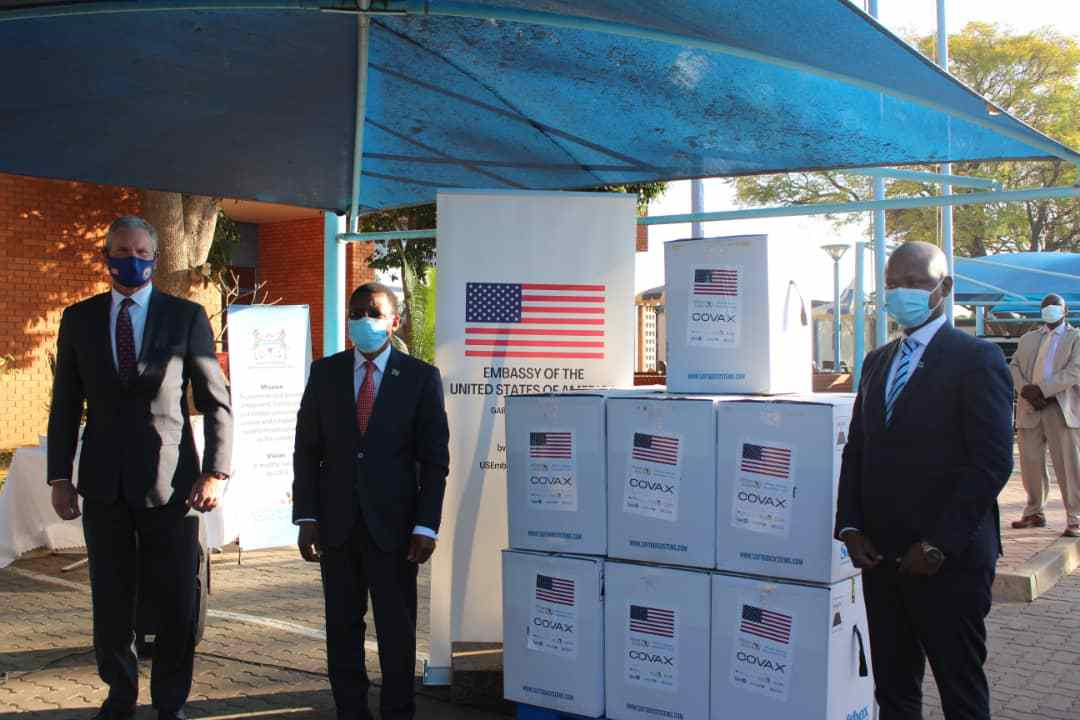
The US delivers Pfizer–BioNTech COVID-19 vaccines to Botswana as part of the COVAX program in 2021

In August, the chief executive officer of former president Ian Khama's SKI Khama Foundation issued a statement to the effect that the foundation had secured two million doses of the Oxford-AstraZeneca vaccine and two million doses of the Pfizer-BioNTech vaccine, sourced through U.S. firm KKM Global Group. The foundation offered the government to purchase the four million doses but needed a decision within five business days. Pfizer and AstraZeneca denied supplying any doses to KKM Global Group.

On 8 August, Botswana received 38,400 doses of the Oxford-AstraZeneca vaccine, followed by 108,000 doses of the Janssen vaccine. On 19 August, it received 81,900 doses of the Pfizer-BioNTech vaccine donated by the United States.

By 23 August, Greater Gaborone had run out of Oxford-AstraZeneca, Janssen and CoronaVac doses and had to halt first inoculations until further notice, pending the arrival of more vaccine doses. Inoculations resumed a month later.

By the end of the month, 337,989 persons had received their first inoculation and 215,502 had received both doses.

==== September 2021 ====
On 5 September, Botswana received 404,494 doses of the CoronaVac vaccine.

On 18 September, Botswana received the first 101,760 of 401,280 Oxford-AstraZeneca doses donated by Germany.

On 23 September, Botswana received 50,400 doses of the Janssen vaccine donated by South Africa.

By the end of the month 245,559 persons had been fully vaccinated.

==== October 2021 ====
On 14 October, Botswana received a first batch of 49,200 doses under the supply agreement with Moderna reached in June 2021. One week later, it received 72,000 doses of the Janssen vaccine purchased through the African Vaccine Acquisition Trust, followed by 72,000 more doses of the same vaccine on 25 October and 57,600 doses on 30 October.

By the end of the month 383,320 persons had been fully vaccinated, corresponding to 40% of the targeted population.

==== November 2021 ====
On 18 November, Botswana received 100,260 doses of the Pfizer-BioNTech vaccine through COVAX.

By the end of the month 519,544 persons had been fully vaccinated, corresponding to 93% of the targeted population.

==== December 2021 ====
Botswana received 525,230 doses of the Pfizer-BioNTech vaccine on 2 December; 200,070 doses of the same vaccine on 6 December; 151,200 and 79,200 of the Janssen vaccine on 6 and 8 December respectively. On 12 December it received 72,000 doses of the Janssen vaccine and 72,000 Oxford-AstraZeneca doses, followed by 737,100 doses of the Pfizer-BioNTech vaccine on 16 December.

By the end of the month 1.03 million persons had been fully vaccinated, exceeding the targeted population.

==== January 2022 ====
By the end of the month more than 1.1 million persons had been fully vaccinated, exceeding the targeted population.

==== February 2022 ====
By the end of the month more than 1.4 million persons had been fully vaccinated, exceeding the targeted population.

==== April 2022 ====
By the end of the month more than 1.9 million persons had been fully vaccinated, exceeding the targeted population.

== Progress ==
Cumulative vaccinations

View source data.
