= Maruping Dibotelo =

Maruping Dibotelo is a Botswana judge that served as the Chief Justice of Botswana from 2010 to 2018. He was born on October 13, 1947, in Thamaga
