= Botswana–Namibia border =

International border

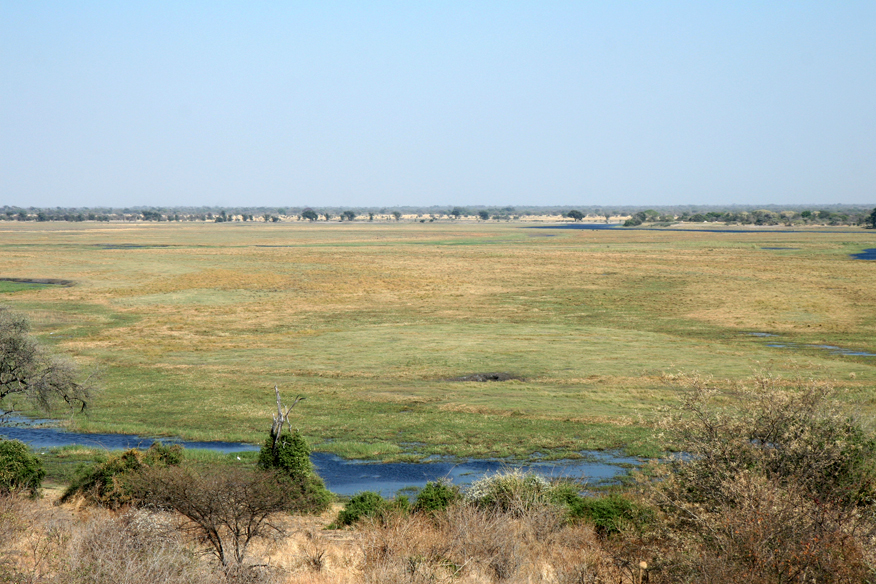
Border Botswana-Namibia at Ngoma

The Botswana–Namibia border is a 1,544 km (959 mi) long border between Botswana and Namibia.

== Border crossings ==
Border crossings:

=== Namibia ===
- Buitepos
- Shakawe
- Ngoma
- Impalila

=== Other ===
==== Zambia ====
- Kazungula

== Sedudu island dispute ==
In 1992, the uninhabited Sedudu island sparked a border dispute between Botswana and Namibia. The island is located in the Cuando River, which is considered a part of the border between two countries. Judges at the World Court ruled that the island belonged to Botswana in December 1999.
