= COVID-19 pandemic in Botswana =

- Disease: COVID-19
- Pathogen: SARS-CoV-2
- Location: Botswana
- First outbreak: Wuhan, Hubei, China
- Index case: Gaborone
- Arrival date: 30 March 2020 (6 years, 6 months and 4 weeks)
- Confirmed cases: 330,699 (updated 18 September 2026)
- Deaths: 2,801 (updated 18 September 2026)
- Vaccinations: 1,951,054 (total vaccinated); 1,663,490 (fully vaccinated); 3,171,667 (doses administered)

This article documents the impacts of the COVID-19 pandemic in Botswana.

== Background ==
On 12 January 2020, the World Health Organization (WHO) confirmed that a novel coronavirus was the cause of a respiratory illness in a cluster of people in Wuhan, Hubei, China, which was reported to the WHO on 31 December 2019.

The case fatality ratio for COVID-19 has been much lower than SARS of 2003, but the transmission has been significantly greater, with a significant total death toll. Model-based simulations for Botswana indicate that the 95% confidence interval for the time-varying reproduction number R_{t} was lower than 1 in the second half of 2021.

== Timeline ==
=== March 2020 ===
On 25 March, a 78-year-old woman who was suspected of having COVID-19 died in Ramotswa. A few days after her death, the results came back positive, making it the fourth confirmed case of COVID-19 in Botswana. In a live broadcast on BTV, vice president Slumber Tsogwane said tracer teams had picked up fourteen people who had been in contact with the infected patients and testing had been conducted on them. On 30 March, the first four cases in the country were confirmed via an announcement by Minister of Health and wellness Dr. Lemogang Kwape.

=== April 2020 ===
There were two new COVID-19 tests a week later and on 19 April 2020 Dr. Kwape announced that there were five new COVID-19 cases, two of which came from the United Kingdom and three of which were locally transmitted, making the locally transmitted cases at that time 6.

On 22 April, two more cases were confirmed in the Metsimotlhabe-Molepolole region, bringing the total number of cases to 22. Both new cases were reported to be locally transmitted, raising the total number of locally transmitted cases to 8 at that time. On 28 April there was one more locally transmitted case.

According to the Ministry of Health contact tracing has commenced in Molepolole, Metsimotlhabe, Mahalapye, Bobonong and Siviya, all of which have coronavirus cases. As of 1 May 2020, 7675 tests have been made, members of the National Assembly and the president and the vice-president were found negative.

In a televised speech, President Masisi extended the national lockdown by a week and a further two weeks during which the lockdown would be sequentially eased. According to the president all 21 COVID-19 patients are asymptomatic and on their way to a full recovery. The results of those who were in contact with the deceased were announced by the Minister of Health and wellness Dr. Lemogang Kwape whom also announced the first three cases, Kwape announced that 7 of the 14 were found positive bringing the total number of cases at that time to 13.

On 29 April, Botswana recorded a total of 5 recoveries.

By the end of April the total number of confirmed cases reached 24, an increase by 19 from March. The death toll remained unchanged. There were 17 active cases, 14 more than at the end of March.

=== May 2020 ===
Three more recovered patients were announced on 1 May 2020. On Thursday 7 May 2020 Botswana recorded on more COVID-19 recovery. On Friday 8 May 2020 00:00 GMT+2 Botswana's 35 day lockdown period came to an end, the end of this period marks the beginning of the ease of the COVID-19 restrictions put in place by government for a further three weeks, with the return to work phases starting on 8 May 2020 and ending on 14 May. On Monday 11 May 2020, Botswana recorded 1 more case. As of 12 May 2020 there have been 11,495 tests performed. Five more patients recovered, leaving six active cases. One more patient tested positive on 17 May, raising the number of active cases to 7. On 21 May four more positive tests were announced while two infected patients recovered, bringing the active cases at that time to 9. A day later on Friday 22 May 2020, Botswana recorded one case bringing the total number of new cases reported in the week beginning Sunday 17 May to six. On 24 May there were five additional cases, raising the total number to 35 and the number of active cases to 15.

By the end of May, the total number of confirmed cases reached 35, with the death toll remained unchanged. There were 14 active cases, a decrease by 18% from the end of April.

=== June 2020 ===
By 14 June, there was a total of 24,800 COVID tests performed.

On 13 June, The Botswana COVID-19 Presidential Task Force had decided to put the zone under lockdown for the second time. Schools and other non-essential services were re-closed, with no outside activity allowed without permits. The lockdown period ended on 16 June as they had successfully used contact tracing to identify the known contacts.

By the end of June, the total number of confirmed cases reached 227. Of these people, 181 persons had agreed to be repatriated to their home countries, 28 of the remaining 46 patients had recovered, one had died, and 17 remained active cases (an increase by 21% from the end of May).

=== July 2020 ===
On 27 July, the second Botswana death via COVID-19 was reported.

On 31 July, the Greater Gaborone zone had come under lock down for the third time after a steep uptick of COVID-19 locally transmitted cases. The lockdown was expected to take a period of two weeks. By the end of the month, the total number of confirmed cases was 894.

=== August 2020 ===
On 6 August a doctor and his wife tested positive at Bamalete Lutheran Hospital, while a patient at the same hospital died from suspected COVID-19. The following day, members of the Presidential COVID-19 task force were tested for coronavirus. 10 of the 46 tests carried out among the task force were positive. Members testing positive included Dr Kereng Masupu (coordinator) and Dr Mogomotsi Matshaba (scientific advisor). Professor Mosepele (deputy coordinator), who tested negative, tendered his resignation from the task force but later withdrew it.

There were 172 new cases on 7 August, the highest number of infections announced in a single day so far. Three days later 148 new cases were reported, raising the total number of confirmed cases to 1214. A fatality was announced on 13 August, raising the death toll to three. The same day 94 new cases were reported, of which 67 were citizens and 27 were foreign nationals. The total number of confirmed cases rose to 1308.

On 16 August there were 134 new cases, raising the total number of cases to 1442. This rose to 1562 on 22 August after 120 new cases were confirmed (73 locals and 47 foreigners).

71 new cases and three deaths were reported on 24 August, raising the total number of cases to 1633 and the death toll to 6. The three fatalities reported on 24 August were a three-month-old baby and two adult women.

There were 91 new cases on 28 August, raising the total number of confirmed cases to 1724.

=== September 2020 ===
On 4 September the number of confirmed cases rose by 278 to 2002; the highest daily increase so far. The death toll increased to 8. On 7 and 10 September another 124 and 126 cases were announced, raising the total number of confirmed cases to 2252. The death toll increased to 10.

On 14 September there were 211 new cases, raising the total number of confirmed cases to 2463. The death toll rose to 11. Two days later 104 more cases were reported, bringing the total number of confirmed cases to 2567. The death toll rose to 13.

There were 354 new cases on 24 September, the highest number of daily reported cases so far and bringing the total number of confirmed cases to 2921. The death toll rose to 16.

Three days later, the total number of confirmed cases rose by 251 to 3172. The death toll remained unchanged.

=== November 2020 ===
On 25 November, the number of confirmed cases increased to 10258, surpassing 10000 confirmed cases in the country.

=== December 2020 ===
On 2 December the number of confirmed cases increased to 11531, of which 1521 had been transferred to other countries, while the death toll rose to 34.

On 6 December the number of confirmed cases increased to 12058, of which 1532 had been transferred to other countries. The death toll rose to 36.

On 11 December the number of confirmed cases increased to 12501, of which 1570 had been transferred to other countries. The death toll rose to 37. Three days later the number of confirmed cases increased to 12873, of which 1593 had been transferred to other countries. The death toll rose to 38. Two days later the number of confirmed cases rose to 13014, of which 1600 had been transferred to other countries.

On 20 December the number of confirmed cases increased to 13622 of which 1640 had been transferred to other countries.

On 23 December the number of confirmed cases increased to 14025 of which 1685 had been transferred to other countries. The death toll rose to 40.

On 29 December the number of confirmed cases increased to 14700 of which 1759 had been transferred to other countries. Two days later the number of confirmed cases increased to 14877 of which 1786 had been transferred to other countries. The death toll rose to 42.

=== January 2021 ===
On 3 January the number of confirmed cases increased to 15440 of which 1827 had been transferred to other countries. The death toll rose to 45. The Minister of Health and Wellness Edwin Dikoloti announced that the 501.V2 variant first identified in South Africa on 18 December had reached Botswana. According to the Director of Health Services, Dr Malebogo Kebabonye, cases of the variant appeared to be overrepresented in the Maun area.

On 6 January the number of confirmed cases increased to 16050 of which 1879 had been transferred to other countries. The death toll rose to 48. Two days later the number of confirmed cases increased to 16768 of which 1925 had been transferred to other countries. The death toll rose to 59.

On 18 January, the number of confirmed deaths surpassed 100, increasing to 105.

=== February 2021 ===
On 1 February the number of confirmed cases increased to 23503 of which 2230 had been transferred to other countries. The death toll rose to 163.

On 5 February the number of confirmed cases increased to 24435 of which 2270 had been transferred to other countries. The death toll rose to 179.

On 8 February the number of confirmed cases increased to 24926 of which 2299 had been transferred to other countries. The death toll rose to 202.

On 15 February the number of confirmed cases increased to 26524 of which 2327 had been transferred to other countries. The death toll rose to 254.

On 19 February the number of confirmed cases increased to 27721 of which 2329 had been transferred to other countries. The death toll rose to 300. Most cases occurred in population agglomerations such as Gaborone, Francistown, Selebi Phikwe, Maun, Mochudi and Molepolole.

On 22 February the number of confirmed cases increased to 28371 of which 2340 had been transferred to other countries. The death toll rose to 310.

On 26 February the number of confirmed cases increased to 30727 of which 2353 had been transferred to other countries. The death toll rose to 332.

=== March 2021 ===
On 9 March Botswana received a shipment of 30,000 doses of AstraZeneca's Covishield vaccine, donated by India.

Mass vaccination began on 26 March, initially with 30,000 doses donated by India and 33,600 doses purchased through the COVAX facility. The number of confirmed cases increased to 39851 of which 2389 had been transferred to other countries. The death toll rose to 568.

=== April 2021 ===
By 10 April, 31628 persons had received their first inoculation.

On 30 April the number of confirmed cases increased to 50333 of which 2482 had been transferred to other countries. The death toll rose to 724. Since the start of vaccination on 26 March, 49882 persons had received their first inoculation.

=== May 2021 ===
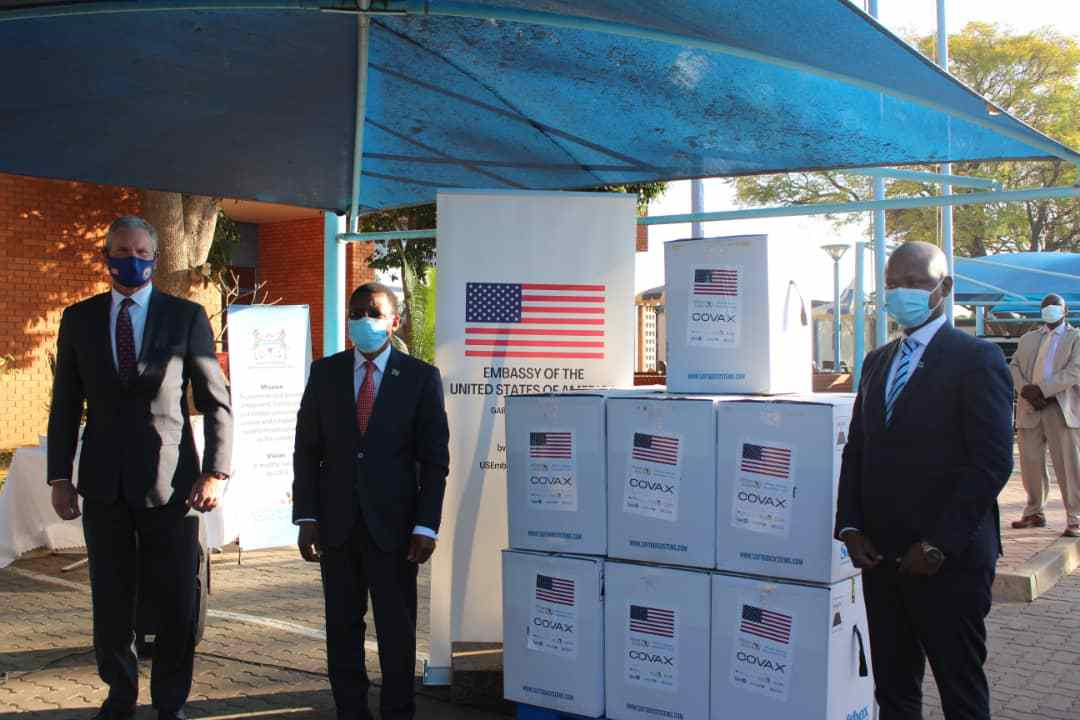
The US delivers Pfizer–BioNTech COVID-19 vaccines to Botswana as part of the COVAX program in 2021

On 17 May the number of confirmed cases increased to 54151 of which 2531 had been transferred to other countries. The death toll rose to 784. Since the start of vaccination on 26 March, 88907 persons had received their first inoculation. The same day the Ministry of Health and Wellness announced that the variant first identified in India on 5 October had reached Botswana on 24 April and that so far two cases had been identified.

On 21 May the number of confirmed cases increased to 55402 of which 2537 had been transferred to other countries. The death toll rose to 809. Since the start of vaccination on 26 March, 120055 persons had received their first inoculation.

=== June 2021 ===
On 18 June the number of confirmed cases increased to 68387 of which 2579 had been transferred to other countries. The death toll rose to 1069. Since the start of vaccinations on 26 March, 152383 vaccine doses had been administered and 48510 persons had been fully vaccinated.

=== July 2021 ===
On 23 July the number of confirmed cases increased to 102124 (excluding those transferred to other countries). The death toll rose to 1485. Since the start of vaccinations on 26 March, 121518 persons had been fully vaccinated.

=== August 2021 ===
On 13 August, the death toll rose to 2043, surpassing 2000 deaths in the country.

On 27 August, the number of fully vaccinated citizens surpassed 200,000 increasing to 207,695.

=== November 2021 ===
On 11 November, the first four cases in the world of the highly mutated Omicron variant of COVID-19 were identified on 22 November from tests taken in Botswana.

By 26 November, the number of fully vaccinated citizens surpassed half a million, increasing to 508980 on that day.

=== December 2021 ===
On 10 December, the number of fully vaccinated people surpassed one million.

On 16 December the number of confirmed cases surpassed 200,000, increasing to 204701.

Modelling by WHO's Regional Office for Africa suggests that due to under-reporting, the true cumulative number of infections by the end of 2021 was around 1.3 million while the true number of COVID-19 deaths was around 3586.

=== January 2022 ===
On 3 January, as it was announced that the president of Botswana, Mokgweetsi Masisi, tested positive for COVID-19 and was self-isolating.

On 16 January, the COVID-19 vaccine booster was administered worldwide.

=== March 2022 ===
On 15 March, the number of confirmed cases surpasses 300,000, increasing to 304706. The death toll rose to 2673. Since the start of vaccinations on 26 March 2021, over 1.4 million persons had been fully vaccinated while over 200,000 people have received the booster vaccination.

=== June 2022 ===
On 24 June, the Ministry of Health announced that the country was in the midst of a fifth wave of COVID-19 infections that began in May of the same year.

On 30 June, the number of people that have received the booster vaccination surpassed 400,000.

=== October 2022 ===
On 27 October, the number of fully vaccinated people rose above 1.5 million.

=== December 2022 ===
The number of confirmed cases increased to 327,021 on 3 December, 327471 on 10 December, 327,820 on 17 December, 328031 on 24 December, and 328,190 on 31 December. The death toll rose to 2787.

Since the start of vaccinations on 26 March 2021, 1.6 million persons had been fully vaccinated while half a million have received the booster vaccination.

=== 2023 ===
The Ministry of Health and Wellness announced on 13 January that the XBB.1.5 variant had been detected in Botswana.

The number of confirmed cases increased to 330,409 in 2023. The death toll rose to 2,800.

== Statistics ==
The line charts below show the cumulative and new COVID-19 cases and deaths in Botswana during the height of the pandemic. All info was taken from the Weekly Bulletin on outbreaks and other emergencies. from the Africa CDC.

== Prevention ==
As a precautionary measure the government has banned gatherings of more than 50 people and the entry of people from countries deemed high-risk. On 24 March, the government announced that borders would be closed, save for twelve designated entry points. Citizens of Botswana are permitted to return but must be quarantined for 14 days. There is concern, however, that people may still enter Botswana illegally from Zimbabwe by avoiding official border crossings.

All schools were closed from 20 March. Teaching resumed on 2 June.

The pandemic and travel restrictions disrupted what was to be Botswana's first elephant hunting season since 2014 and affected the diamond industry.

On 31 March the president of Botswana, Mokgweetsi Masisi gave a speech and declared a State of Public Emergency for the purpose of taking appropriate and stringent measures to address the risks posed by the COVID-19 pandemic. The president said that a 21-day State of Public Emergency would not be sufficient to employ the necessary measures to fight the pandemic. The State of Public Emergency would have come into effect from Thursday, 2 April 2020 until Thursday, 30 April 2020, days later the president wanted to extend the 28 day State of Public Emergency to a six month long State of Public Emergency which will end on Friday, 2 October 2020. The president summoned the National Assembly in order for the MPs to vote on the six-month extension. On Thursday, 9 April 2020 the National assembly voted in favour of the six-month extension by acclamation. The full presidential speech can be found here: Botswana's response to the COVID-19 pandemic.

With effect from 1 May 2020, wearing a face mask is compulsory when leaving one's home.

On 20 May the extreme social distancing brought in on 2 April came to an end. It was replaced by a zoning strategy combined with 13 check points between zones. There are nine COVID-19 zones: Boteti, Chobe, Ghanzi, Greater Francistown, Greater Gaborone, Greater Palapye, Greater Phikwe, Maun, Kgalagadi. On 31 July the Greater Gaborone zone came under lock down.

On 12 June Stanbic Bank Botswana was ordered temporarily to close its Gaborone head office and Fairgrounds branch following a positive test for COVID-19 from an employee. After comprehensive testing with negative results they were able to open again on 17 June (head office) and 18 June (branch).

Also on 12 June, Gaborone Private Hospital (GPH) was ordered to close following eight patients testing positive. All eight tests were later declared negative by the COVID-19 Task Force Team after additional testing and the hospital was allowed to open again from 15 June. GPH has subsequently insisted on its original positive test results. The disagreement over test protocols, outcomes and use of accredited laboratories risked escalating to a matter of national security.

From 24 December to 31 January a nationwide curfew was in place nightly from 7pm to 4am.

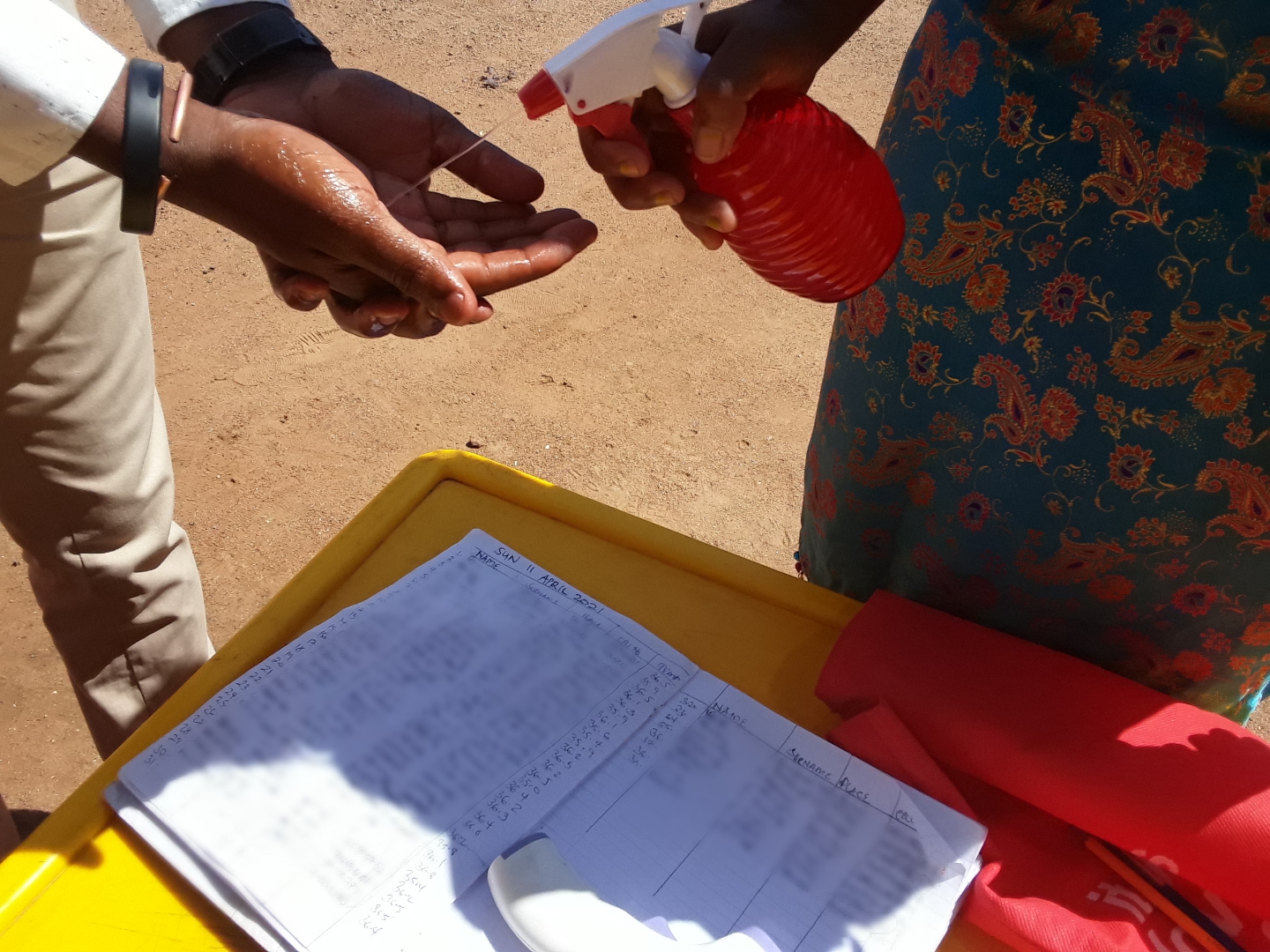
Sanitising station at church.

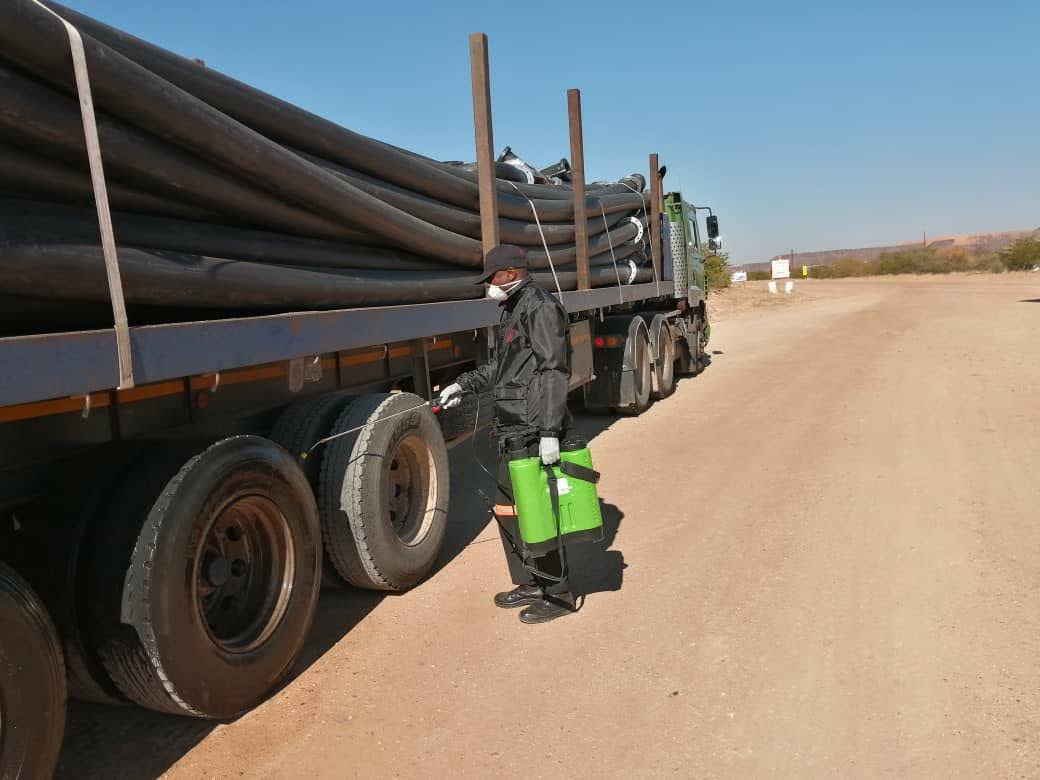
A man disinfecting a truck.

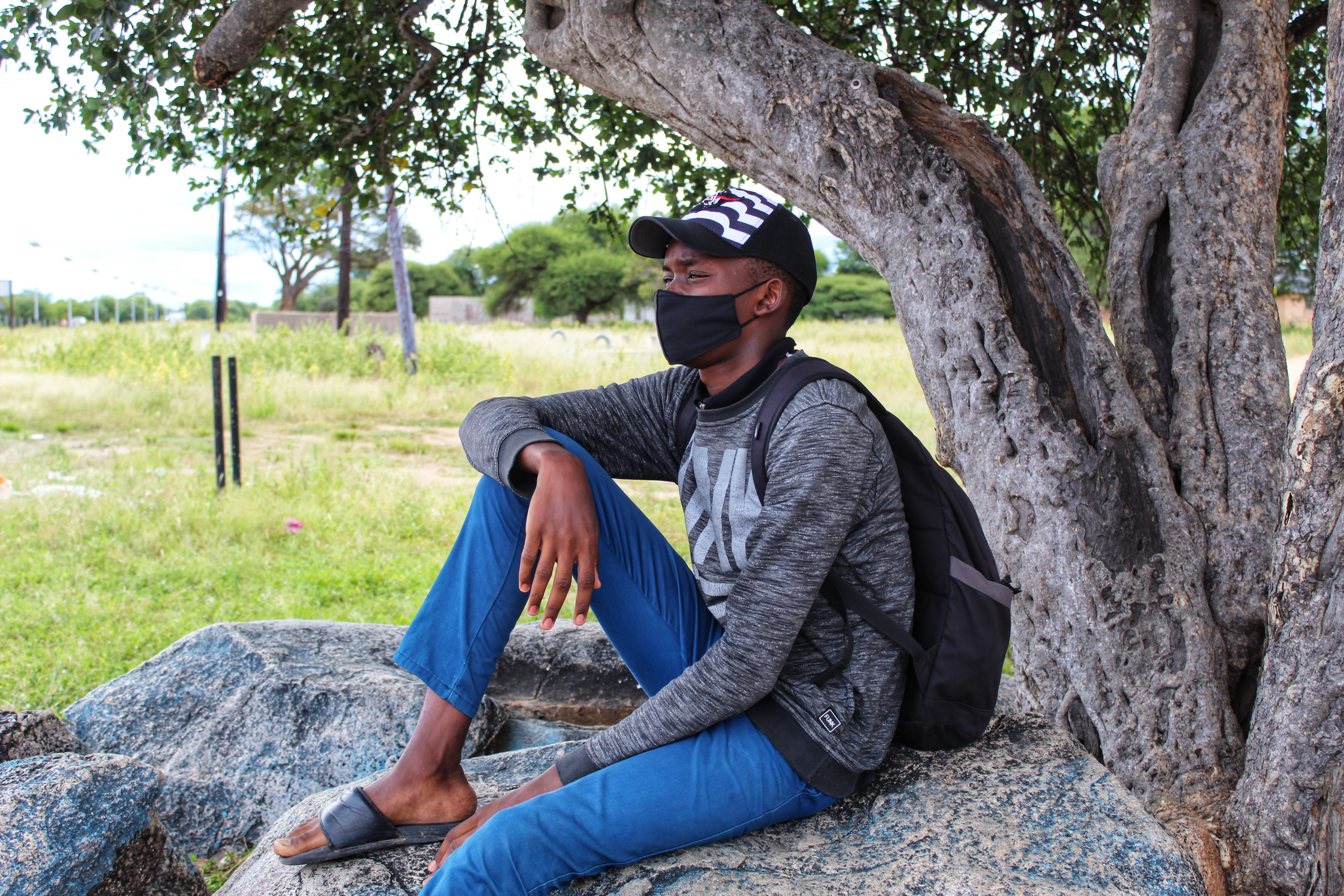
Teenager wearing a mask.

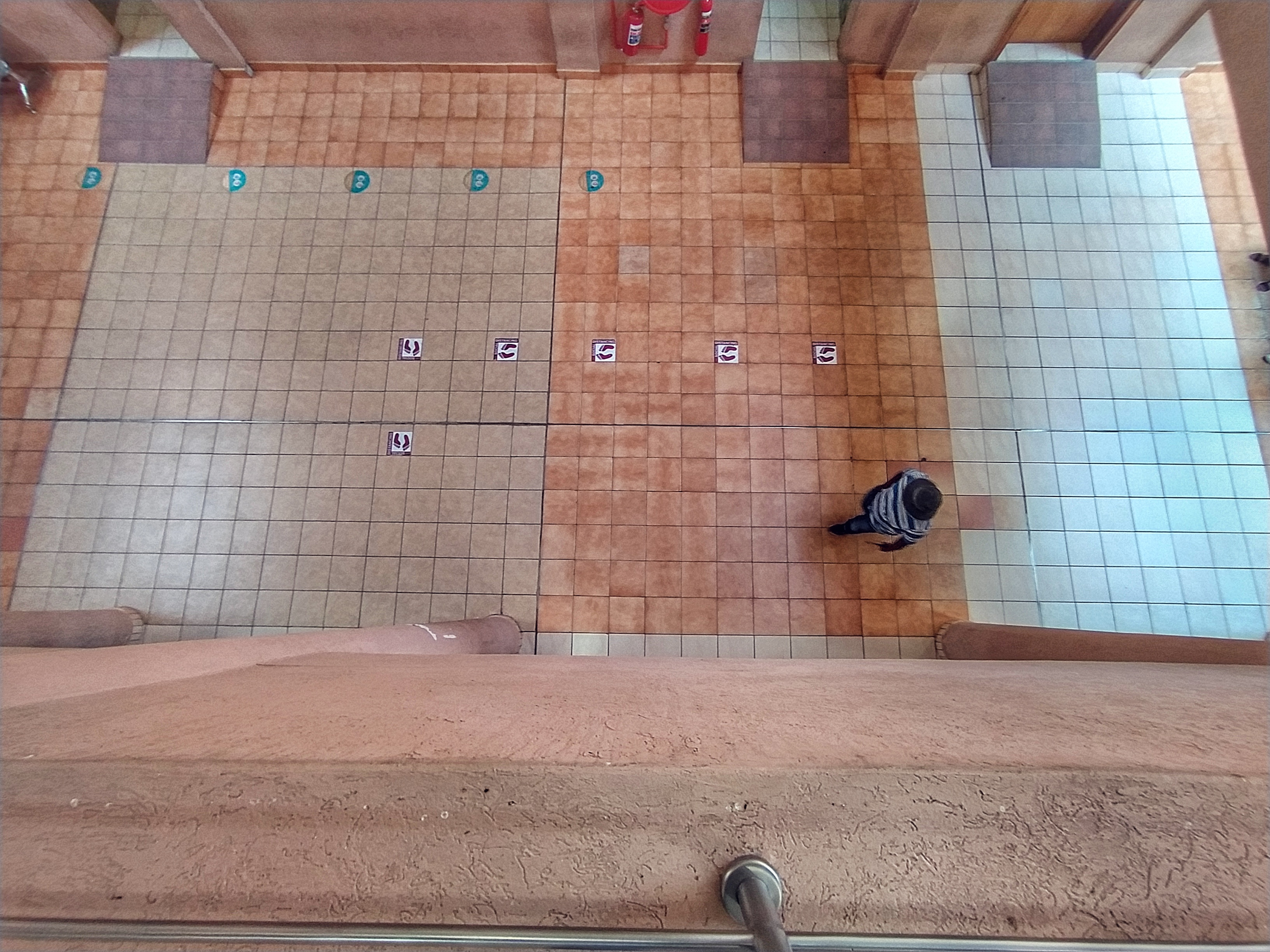
Social distancing at University of Botswana.

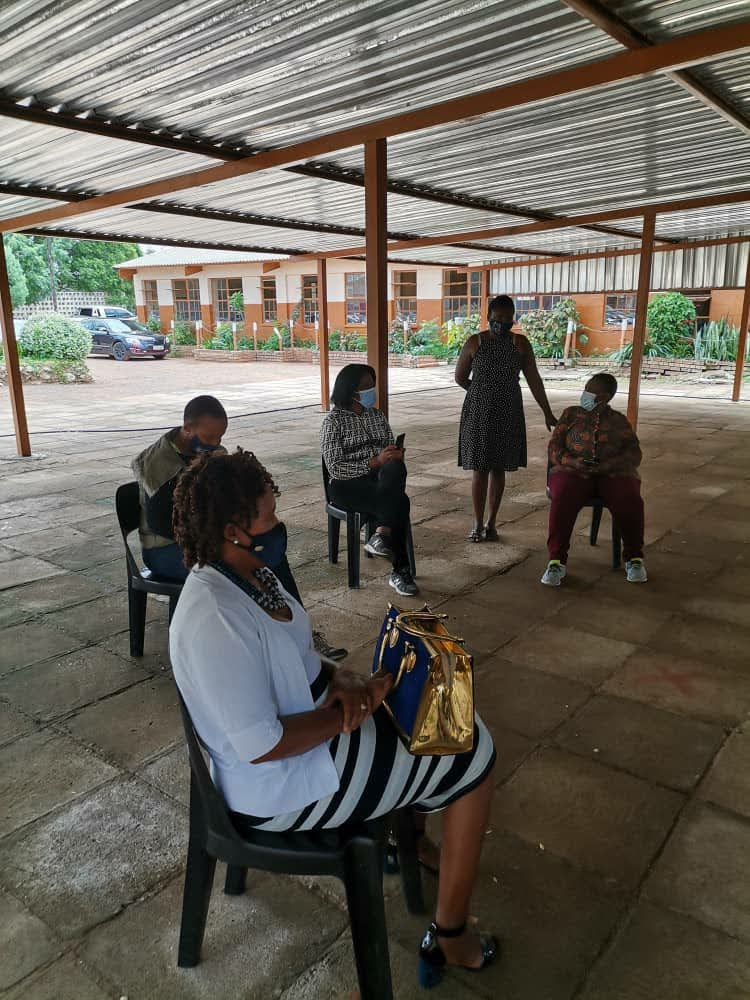
Teachers keeping a safe distance.

== See also ==
- COVID-19 pandemic in Africa
- COVID-19 pandemic by country and territory
- World Health Organization
- COVID-19 recession in Botswana
- SARS-CoV-2 Omicron variant
