= Phandu Skelemani =

Politician in Botswana

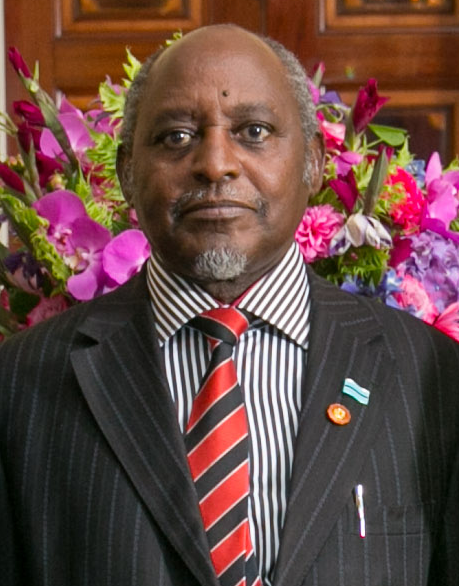
- Skelemani in 2014

9th Speaker of the National Assembly of Botswana
- In office 5 November 2019 – 7 November 2024
- Deputy: Pono Moatlhodi
- Preceded by: Gladys Kokorwe
- Succeeded by: Dithapelo Keorapetse

Minister of Foreign Affairs
- In office 1 April 2008 – 31 October 2014
- Preceded by: Mompati Merafhe
- Succeeded by: Pelonomi Venson-Moitoi

Personal details
- Born: 5 January 1945 (age 81) Mapoka Village, North East District, Bechuanaland
- Party: Botswana Democratic Party
- Education: University of Botswana (LLB)

Phandu Tombola Chaka Skelemani (born 5 January 1945) is a Motswana politician who is the former speaker of the National Assembly of Botswana having served from 2018 to 2024. He served in the government of Botswana as Minister of Foreign Affairs from 2008 to 2014. A member of the Botswana Democratic Party (BDP), Skelemani was a Member of Parliament in the National Assembly of Botswana, a position he vacated following the defeat of the Botswana Democratic Party in November 2024, and a member of the Pan-African Parliament from Botswana, and he served as Attorney-General of Botswana from 1992 to 2003.

== Career ==
Skelemani was born in Mapoka Village. He earned a degree in law from the University of Botswana, Lesotho and Swaziland and worked in the civil service for 30 years, beginning when he became a State Counsel in 1973. Subsequently he became Senior State Counsel in 1975, Principal State Counsel in 1978, and Deputy Attorney-General in 1980. He was appointed Attorney-General in 1992; in that capacity, he advised the Cabinet and attended Cabinet meetings.

When Joy Phumaphi resigned from Parliament in August 2003 to become Assistant Director-General of the World Health Organization, Skelemani in turn resigned from his post as Attorney-General and stood as the BDP candidate in the by-election held in Phumaphi's former constituency, Francistown East. In campaigning for the seat, Skelemani pointed to his background in the area, saying that this would enable him to represent it well in Parliament. Skelemani won the by-election and took his parliamentary seat in November 2003. A year later, on November 9, 2004, he was appointed to the Cabinet as Minister of Presidential Affairs and Public Administration.

Skelemani was moved to the position of Minister for the Administration of Justice, Attorney General's Chambers, Botswana Defence Force, Police, the Directorate on Corruption and Economic Crime, and Security in January 2007. When Ian Khama took office as President on 1 April 2008, he appointed Skelemani as Minister of Foreign Affairs instead.

On November 5, 2019 he was elected as speaker of the National Assembly of Botswana by the parliament.

== See also ==
- List of members of the Pan-African Parliament
- https://www.parliament.gov.bw/index.php/2012-02-13-15-06-33
