= Terence Rannowane =

Botswana judge

Chief Justice of Botswana
- In office 1 May 2018 – 18 January 2025
- Appointed by: Mokgweetsi Masisi
- Preceded by: Maruping Dibotelo
- Succeeded by: Gaolapelwe Ketlogetswe

Personal details
- Education: University of Botswana (LLB); University of Warwick (LLM)

Terence Rannowane is a Botswana judge who served as chief justice of Botswana from 2018 to 2025. He judicial career started in 1990, and he was appointed to the High Court of Botswana in 2008. Rannowane also served as chair of the National Parole Board and National Delimitation Commission.

== Early life and education ==
Rannowane graduated from the University of Botswana with a Bachelor of Laws degree in 1990, and from the University of Warwick with a Master of Laws degree in 2003.

== Career ==
Rannowane became a Magistrate Grade II in 1990, and rose to become a Regional Magistrate in 2005. He was appointed to the High Court of Botswana in 2008. He was appointed as chair of the National Delimitation Commission, which was in charge of drawing new parliamentary constituencies, in 2012. He also served as chair of the National Parole Board and the Botswana Magistrates Welfare committee.

President Mokgweetsi Masisi appointed Rannowane to succeed Maruping Dibotelo as chief justice and swore him into office on 1 May 2018. Rannowane stepped down as chief justice due to medical reasons and was succeeded by Gaolapelwe Ketlogetswe on 18 January 2025.

In 2014, Rannowane ruled in response to a petition filed by Lesbians, Gays and Bisexuals of Botswana (LEGABIBO) that LGBT people could register their organisations due to freedom of association. LEGABIBO applied for registration in 2012, but were rejected under the claim that the Constitution of Botswana did not recognize homosexuals and that recognising them would violate the Botswana Societies Act.

== Works cited ==
=== News ===
- "Botswana: Rannowane New Chief Justice". Daily News Botswana. 27 April 2018. Archived from the original on 27 June 2025.
- "Ketlogetswe new Chief Justice". Daily News Botswana. 18 January 2025. Archived from the original on 27 June 2025.
- "Masisi swears in new Chief Justice". Daily News Botswana. 1 May 2018. Archived from the original on 27 June 2025.
- LaForgia, Elizabeth (15 November 2014). "Botswana court allows LGBT rights group to formally register". Jurist. Archived from the original on 27 June 2025.

=== Web ===
- "Hon. Terence Rannowane". Southern African Chief Justices Forum. Archived from the original on 27 June 2025.
- "Justice Terence Rannowane". Centre for Human Rights. Archived from the original on 27 June 2025.
