= Speaker of the National Assembly of Botswana =

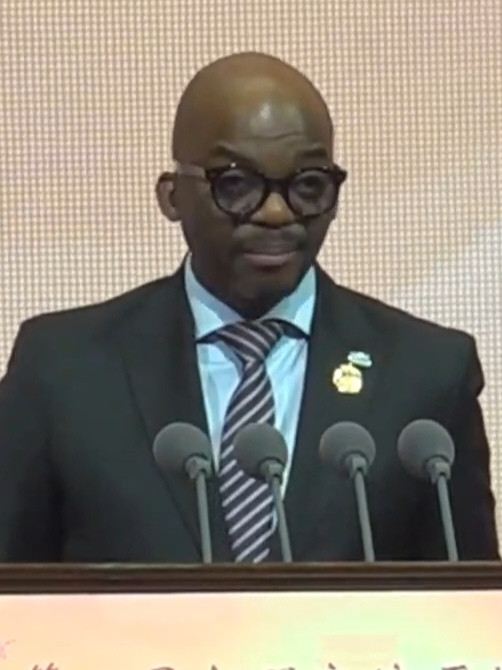
- Incumbent; Dithapelo Keorapetse since 7 November 2024
- National Assembly of Botswana
- Status: Presiding officer
- Seat: National Assembly Building, Gaborone
- Constituting instrument: Constitution of Botswana
- Formation: 1965; 61 years ago
- First holder: Alfred Merriweather; 1965
- Deputy: Helen Manyeneng

The Speaker of the National Assembly is the presiding officer of the unicameral Parliament of Botswana. Since Botswana's independence from the United Kingdom in 1965, eight men and women have served as Speaker. The first, Alfred Merriweather, a Scottish missionary and physician, served from 1965 to 1968. The current Speaker, Dithapelo Keorapetse, has been speaker since 7 November 2024.

== List of speakers ==
Name	Office	Party
Alfred Merriweather OBE	1965–1968	Botswana Democratic Party
Albert Frank Lock	1968–1979	Botswana Democratic Party
James G. Haskins OBE	1979–1989	Botswana Democratic Party
Moutlakgola P. K. Nwako	1989–1999	Botswana Democratic Party
Matlapeng Ray Molomo	1999–2004	Botswana Democratic Party
Patrick Balopi	2004–2009	Botswana Democratic Party
Margaret Nasha	2009–2014	Botswana Democratic Party
Gladys Kokorwe	2014–2019	Botswana Democratic Party
Phandu Skelemani	2019–2024	Botswana Democratic Party
Dithapelo Keorapetse	2024–present	Umbrella for Democratic Change

== Sources ==
- Former Speakers of Parliament, Official website of the Parliament of Botswana
