= Government of Botswana =

- Central government

Overview
- Established: 30 September 1966; 59 years ago
- State: Botswana
- Leader: President (Duma Boko)
- Main organ: Cabinet of Botswana
- Responsible to: Parliament of Botswana
- Annual budget: BWP53. 47 billion
- Website: www.gov.bw

The Government of Botswana often abbreviated as GOB, is the union government created by the constitution of Botswana having the executive, parliament, and the judiciary. The Seat of the Government is located in Gaborone, Botswana. The government is led by the president.

== Executive ==
This section defines the executive branch including the President, Vice President, and Cabinet.

=== The President ===
The President is the chief executive of the state. The President is elected president by members of the National Assembly. These members state on the ballot who they would support for President if elected, and after election to the National Assembly vote for whomever they indicated they would elect as President. The President has the following requirements: (a) is a citizen of Botswana by birth or descent; (b) has attained the age of 30 years; and (c) is qualified to be elected as a Member of the National Assembly. The President's term is limited up to 10 years, or however long the President holds office in the National Assembly.

The executive power of Botswana resides solely in the President. The President is also the commander of the armed forces. The president also has the power to pardon a person convicted of a crime.

=== The Vice President ===
The Vice President is chosen by the President from among the members of the National Assembly. The Vice President takes over for the President when the President is unable to fulfil his duties either because of illness, death, or other reasons.The Vice President is second-in-command to the President and carries out the missions of the President.The current vice-president is Ndaba Gaolathe.

=== The Cabinet ===
This Cabinet is composed of the President, the Vice President and no more than six ministers who are appointed by the President from the National Assembly. The Ministers in the Cabinet are responsible for advising the President with respect to the policy of the government.

== Parliament ==
This section describes both the National Assembly as well as the Ntlo ya Dikgosi, which together create the Parliament of Botswana.

=== National Assembly ===
The Parliament consists of the President and National Assembly. The president is a voting member of the National Assembly. There are an additional 57 elected members of the National Assembly. There is also a speaker of the Assembly who is elected by the members of the Assembly, but does not necessarily have to be a member of the assembly themselves. There is also a deputy speaker elected by the Assembly.

In order for a person to be eligible to be a member of the Assembly they must: be a citizen of Botswana, be 18 years old, be registered to vote, and be able to speak and read in English. There are many conditions that disqualify a member from eligibility, most of these dealing with allegiance to other countries.

Botswana is divided into the number of constituencies that they have members of parliament so that each district sends one member to the Assembly. People in Botswana are eligible to vote if they are: 18, a citizen, and have resided in Botswana for 12 consecutive months.

=== Ntlo ya Dikgosi ===
In addition to a parliament, Botswana also has a Ntlo ya Dikgosi. The Ntlo ya Dikgosi acts as an advisory body to the Parliament of Botswana. This body consists of 33-35 members. In order to be eligible to be a member one must be 21 years old and a citizen. There are similar disqualifying conditions for this body as there are for the National Assembly. Members are appointed for 5-year terms. No member may participate in party politics, and many members are tribal chiefs. This body possesses no legislative power, including approval or veto power; rather they advise the Parliament on bills and measures. A power the body does have is to summon members of the government to appear before it.

== Local government ==
Local government is administered by nine district councils and five town councils. District commissioners have executive authority and are appointed by the central government and assisted by elected and nominated district councillors and district development committees. There has been ongoing debate about the political, social, and economic marginalization of the San (Bushmen). The government's policies for remote area dwellers continue to spark controversy and may be revised in response to domestic and donor concerns.

== Judicature ==
This section describes the varying parts of the judiciary in Botswana including the High Court, the Court of Appeal, and the Judicial Service Commission.

=== High Court ===
The High Court of Botswana acts as the supreme legal source, in which the court possesses unlimited original jurisdiction to hear any cases. The court has a Chief Judge as well as a number of other judges, in which the number is determined by the Parliament. The Chief Justice is appointed by the President, as are all of the other Justices, but these can be advised to the President by the Parliament. In order to be qualified to be a judge on this court one must have either been a judge, been an attorney, been a law professor with a law degree, or been a Chief Magistrate. Appointments to this court are until the person reaches the age of 70. The only other reason a judge would leave the high court is if the Parliament decides the person is no longer able to properly perform their duties.

The High Court has authority to interpret the constitution. If there is disagreement on any interpretation, that disagreement is settled by the High Court.

Botswana has had ten chief justices:

No.	Name	Tenure
1	Dendy Young	1968–1971
2	Akinola Aguda	1972–1975
3	George O. L. Dyke	1975–1977
4	Robert John Hayfron-Benjamin	1977–1981
5	James Aiden O'Brien Quinn	1981–1987
6	Luke Livesey	1987–1992
7	Moleleki D. Mokama	1992–1997
8	Julian Nganunu	1997–2010
9	Maruping Dibotelo	2010–2018
10	Terence Rannowane	2018-2025
11	Gaolapelwe Ketlogetswe	2025-present

=== Court of Appeal ===
The Court of Appeal has the right to hear any case in Botswana in which one party has appealed the decision found. This court consists of a President of the Court of Appeal, a number of other judges, and the entirety of the High Court. Like the High Court, the President is appointed by the President as are the other judges, with the advice of Parliament. In order to be qualified a person must have been either a judge, attorney, or law professor. As is with the High Court a person is appointed until the age of 70, barring Parliament does not find them incapable during their tenure.

=== Judicial Service Commission ===
The Judicial Service Commission is created to help advise the President on judicial nominations. It consists of the Chief Justice, the President of the Court of Appeals, the Attorney-General, the Chairman of the Public Service Commission, a member of the Law Society nominated by the Law Society, and a person of integrity and experience who is not a legal practitioner appointed by the President.

== Politics of Botswana ==
Politics of Botswana takes place in a framework of a parliamentary representative democratic republic, whereby the President of Botswana is both head of state and head of government, and of a multi-party system. Executive power is exercised by the government. Legislative power is vested in both the government and the Parliament of Botswana. In part because the party system has been dominated by the Botswana Democratic Party (BDP), which never lost power since the country gained independence, until 2024, the Economist Intelligence Unit has rated Botswana as a "flawed democracy."

== Foreign relations ==
=== International organizations ===
ACP, AfDB, C, ECA, FAO, G-77, IAEA, IBRD, ICAO, ICCt, ICFTU, ICRM, IDA, IFAD, IFC, IFRCS, ILO, IMF, Interpol, IOC, ISO, ITU, NAM, OAU, OPCW, SACU, SADC, UN, UNCTAD, UNESCO, UNIDO, UPU, WCO, WFTU, WHO, WIPO, WMO, WTO, WT.
