= 13th Parliament of Botswana =

Current meeting of the Botswana National Assembly

←	12th
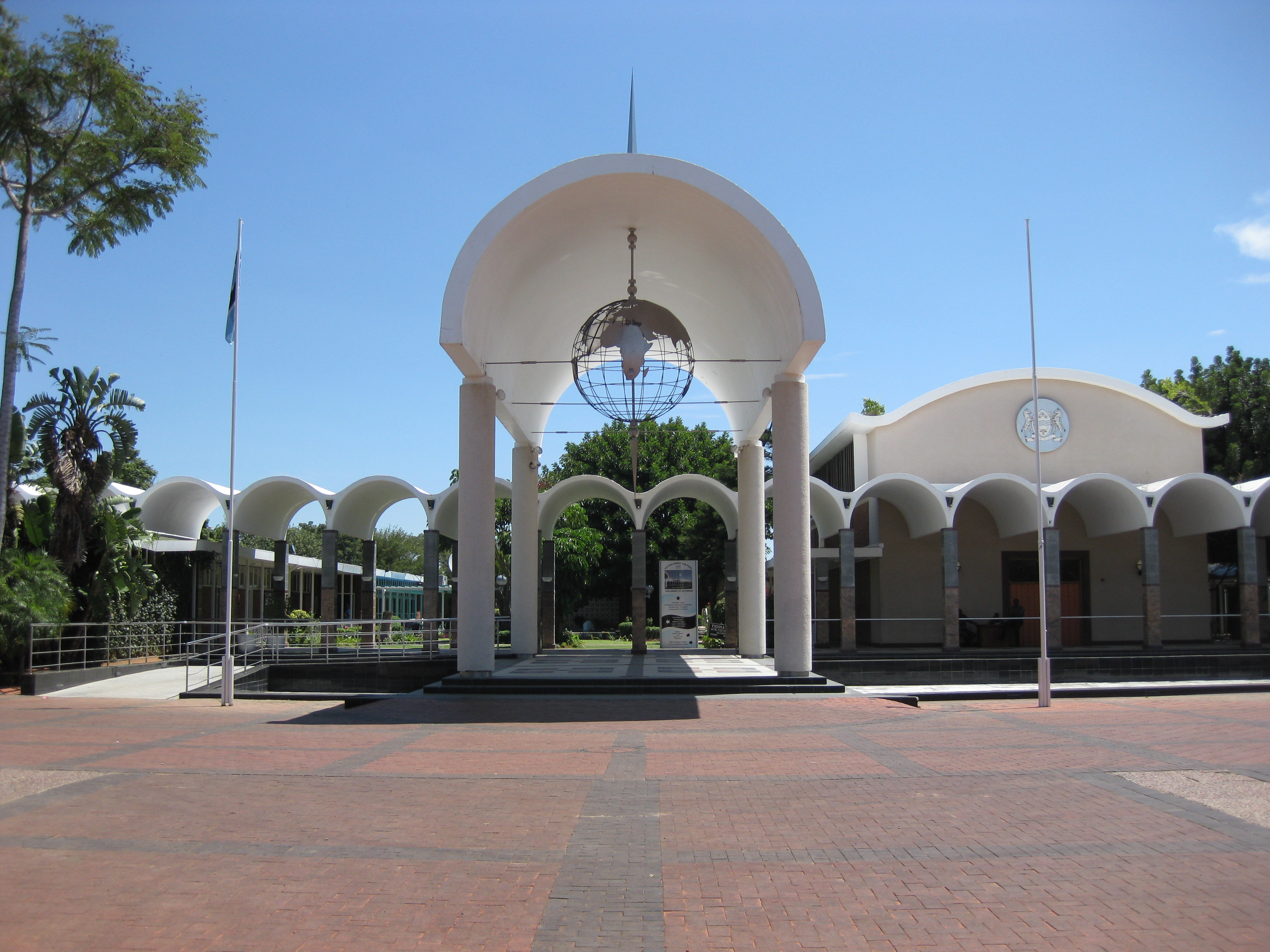
- National Assembly Building, Gaborone

Overview
- Legislative body: National Assembly
- Term: 7 November 2024 –
- Election: 30 October 2024
- Government: Boko cabinet
- Opposition: BCP
- Website: parliament.gov.bw

National Assembly
- Members: 69
- Speaker: Dithapelo Keorapetse (ex-officio)
- Deputy Speaker: Helen Manyeneng (UDC)
- President of Botswana: Duma Boko (ex-officio)
- Leader of the House: Moeti Mohwasa (Specially-elected)
- Leader of the Opposition: Dumelang Saleshando (BCP)
- Party control: UDC

The 13th Parliament of Botswana is the current meeting of the National Assembly, the unicameral legislature of the Parliament of Botswana. Its membership was determined by the results of the 2024 general election. It began on 7 November 2024 following the 30 October 2024 general election and will end in or before November 2029 to trigger the next election.

The Parliament was elected using first-past-the-post voting and single-member constituencies. The Parliament has 61 elected members, an increase of four members, compared to the 12th Parliament, following the 2022 seat redistricting cycle, marking the first time since the inauguration of the 9th Parliament that the number of elected members has risen.

== Background ==
=== 2024 general election ===
The 2024 general election was held on 30 October. The official opposition Umbrella for Democratic Change (UDC) won 36 seats in the election, an increase of 28 seats and the first time in history that a party other than the Botswana Democratic Party (BDP) won an election. The Botswana Congress Party, got 15 seats, an increase of 8. The Botswana Patriotic Front won 5 seats, an increase of 1 seat. The ruling BDP was reduced to a rump of 4 seats after losing a total of 34 seats. Whilst Edwin Dikoloti of Goodhope-Mmathethe, garnered a seat as an independent candidate, the second time Parliament has had an elected independent since Nehemiah Modubule of Lobatse constituency in 2009.

Botswana general election results (30 October 2024)

Party or alliance		Votes	%	Seats	+/–
Umbrella for Democratic; Change	Botswana National Front	193,173	23.12	23	+19
Umbrella for Democratic; Change	Alliance for Progressives	46,799	5.60	6	+5
Umbrella for Democratic; Change	Independents	39,261	4.70	3	+3
Umbrella for Democratic; Change	Botswana People's Party	31,636	3.79	4	+4
Umbrella for Democratic; Change	Total	310,869	37.21	36	+21
Botswana Democratic Party		254,583	30.47	4	−34
Botswana Congress Party		175,972	21.06	15	New
Botswana Patriotic Front		68,978	8.26	5	+2
Botswana Republican Party		4,152	0.50	0	New
Botswana Movement for Democracy		1,146	0.14	0	0
Real Alternative Party		23	0.00	0	0
Independents		19,690	2.36	1	+1
Appointed and ex officio members				8	0
Total		835,413	100.00	69	+4
Valid votes		835,413	98.83		
Invalid/blank votes		9,905	1.17		
Total votes		845,318	100.00		
Registered voters/turnout		1,038,275	81.42		
Source: Independent Electoral Commission

== Seat distribution ==
The table below lists the distribution of the 69 seats by party in the National Assembly. This table shows the number of MPs in each party:

Affiliation	Members
Affiliation	As at the 2025 Kgalagadi South by-election
UDC	36
BPF	5
Specially-elected	6
President	1
Independent	1
Government total	49
BCP	15
BDP	4
Opposition total	19
Speaker	1
Total MPs in Parliament	69
Working Government majority	30

== Members ==
This is a list of the 61 elected members and the 6 specially-elected members of the 13th Parliament of Botswana.

No.	Constituency	Name	Party	Majority	% of total votes	Margin (% points)
1	Chobe	Simasiku Mapulanga	BCP	2,853	63.31	34.49
2	Maun North	Dumelang Saleshando	BCP	5,707	64.08	43.65
3	Maun East	Goretetse Kekgonegile	BCP	4,061	59.14	32.09
4	Maun West	Caterpillar Hikuama	BCP	2,709	55.60	20.75
5	Ngami	Phillimon Aaron	BCP	2,255	59.54	22.84
6	Okavango West	Kenny Kapinga	BCP	1,049	53.12	11.11
7	Okavango East	Gabatsholwe Disho	BCP	795	50.11	9.34
8	Tati East	Thabologo Furniture	BCP	418	33.47	3.12
9	Tati West	Justin Hunyepa	UDC	3,490	49.99	25.99
10	Francistown East	Tiroeaone Ntsima	UDC	370	36.84	4.42
11	Francistown South	Wynter Mmolotsi	UDC	5,109	67.71	53.17
12	Francistown West	Mokwaledi Ignatius Moswaane	UDC	3,803	58.51	35.70
13	Nata-Gweta	Lawrence Ookeditse	BPF	3,916	52.62	33.21
14	Nkange	Motlhaleemang Moalosi	BCP	2,634	43.11	12.16
15	Shashe West	Jeremiah Frenzel	BPF	3,517	53.47	29.97
16	Tonota	Gaefele Sedombo	UDC	2,509	48.20	17.22
17	Bobirwa	Taolo Lucas	BCP	2,343	52.57	12.23
18	Mmadinare	Ketlhalefile Motshegwa	UDC	38	30.33	0.35
19	Selebi-Phikwe East	Kgoberego Nkawana	BCP	968	41.30	14.07
20	Selebi-Phikwe West	Reuben Kaizer	BCP	36	36.94	0.40
21	Palapye	Onneetse Ramogapi	UDC	4,022	44.34	18.74
22	Tswapong North	Prince Maele	UDC	3,076	37.44	15.49
23	Mahalapye East	Augustine Nyatanga	UDC	4,140	53.03	30.75
24	Mahalapye West	David Tshere	UDC	7,957	73.20	58.43
25	Tswapong South	Kesitegile Gobotswang	BCP	1,626	38.22	10.36
26	Shoshong	Moneedi Bagaisamang	UDC	5,112	58.22	38.43
27	Serowe North	Baratiwa Mathoothe	BPF	4,836	63.66	40.32
28	Serowe South	Lesedi Leepetswe	BPF	3,214	44.18	25.12
29	Serowe West	Onalepelo Kedikilwe	BPF	4,141	65.24	41.21
30	Boteti East	Atamelang Keoagile	UDC	2,278	41.92	15.90
31	Boteti West	Sam Digwa	UDC	2,235	49.17	14.66
32	Kgatleng Central	Mpho Morolong	UDC	2,114	43.63	12.74
33	Kgatleng East	Mabuse Pule	BDP	30	39.58	0.25
34	Kgatleng West	Unity Dow	BCP	193	33.05	1.44
35	Gaborone Central	Phenyo Butale	UDC	2,381	47.30	20.50
36	Gaborone North	Shawn Nthaile	UDC	935	37.28	6.51
37	Gaborone South	Nelson Ramaotwana	UDC	4,740	60.31	37.28
38	Gaborone Bonnington North	Maipelo Mophuting	UDC	2,565	47.90	21.94
39	Gaborone Bonnington South	Ndaba Gaolathe	UDC	5,674	63.73	41.07
40	Tlowkeng	Phenyo Segokgo	UDC	4,351	57.63	29.51
41	Gamalete	Boniface Mabeo	BCP	1,629	42.79	7.09
42	Mogoditshane East	Barongwang Letlhogonolo	UDC	1,103	45.38	11.29
43	Mogoditshane West	Galenawabo Lekau	UDC	1,375	42.46	13.39
44	Gabane-Mmankgodi	Thomas Mmusi	BDP	434	37.05	3.29
45	Mmopane-Metsimotlhabe	Helen Manyeneng	UDC	120	33.19	1.16
46	Thamaga-Kumakwane	Palelo Motaosane	BDP	2,191	53.29	14.05
47	Molepolole South	Shima Monageng	UDC	2,364	51.56	14.74
48	Molepolole North	Arafat Khan	UDC	3,057	54.50	12.88
49	Lentsweletau-Lephephe	Bogatsu Tshenolo	UDC	1,116	42.87	7.30
50	Letlhakeng	Domcaza Mogwathi	UDC	4,163	60.67	35.38
51	Takatokwane	Jacob Kelebeng	UDC	3,706	63.20	32.32
52	Lobatse	Kamal Jacobs	UDC	4,173	66.35	40.29
53	Goodhope-Mmathethe	Edwin Dikoloti	Ind.	5,151	45.06	18.88
54	Kanye East	Mogorosi Mosanana	UDC	3,488	59.59	19.19
55	Kanye West	Victor Phologolo	UDC	2,335	53.32	14.68
56	Moshupa-Manyana	Karabo Gare	BDP	6,865	59.50	30.43
57	Jwaneng-Mabutsane	Omphemetse Kwapa	UDC	1,426	44.48	7.33
58	Kgalagadi North	Reason Lekhutlane	UDC	283	48.55	2.67
59	Kgalagadi South	Tokyo Modise	UDC	2,840	57.08	23.96
60	Ghanzi	Noah Salakae	UDC	2,880	54.90	20.88
61	Charleshill	Motsamai Motsamai	UDC	295	41.07	3.73
Specially-elected MPs
62	Pius Mokgware		UDC			
63	Bogolo Kenewendo		Ind.			
64	Moeti Mohwasa		UDC			
65	Stephen Modise		UDC			
66	Lesego Chombo		Ind.			
67	Nono Kgafela-Mokoka		UDC			
President
68	Duma Boko		UDC			
Presiding officer
69	Dithapelo Keorapetse		Spkr.			

== By-elections ==
Constituency	Date	Incumbent	Party	Winner	Party	Cause
Kgalagadi South	15 November 2025	Micus Chimbombi	UDC	Tokyo Modise	UDC	Death of incumbent.

== Membership changes ==
The 13th Parliament of Botswana stands out as unique among all its predecessors, as it is the first in which Members of Parliament have been prohibited from crossing the floor for the entirety of its term. This follows the enactment of a 2020 law that formally banned floor-crossing.

As a result, changes in parliamentary membership during this period are limited solely to resignations, expulsions and deaths.

The table below outlines the membership changes that have occurred in the 13th Parliament.

MP	Date	Constituency	Notes
Micus Chimbombi	26 July 2025	Kgalagadi South	Died in office.

== See also ==
- 2024 Botswana general election
- Politics of Botswana
