= Goodhope-Mmathethe in the 2024 Botswana general election =

Election in Botswana's Goodhope-Mmathethe constituency

2024 Botswana general election in Goodhope-Mmathethe
- 30 October 2024

Goodhope-Mmathethe constituency
- Registered: 33,340
- Turnout: 83.45%
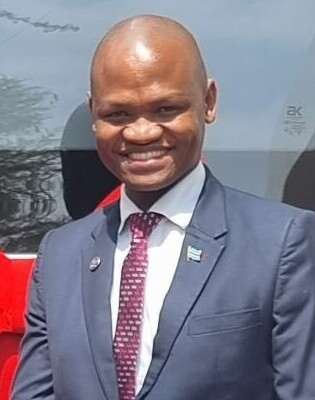

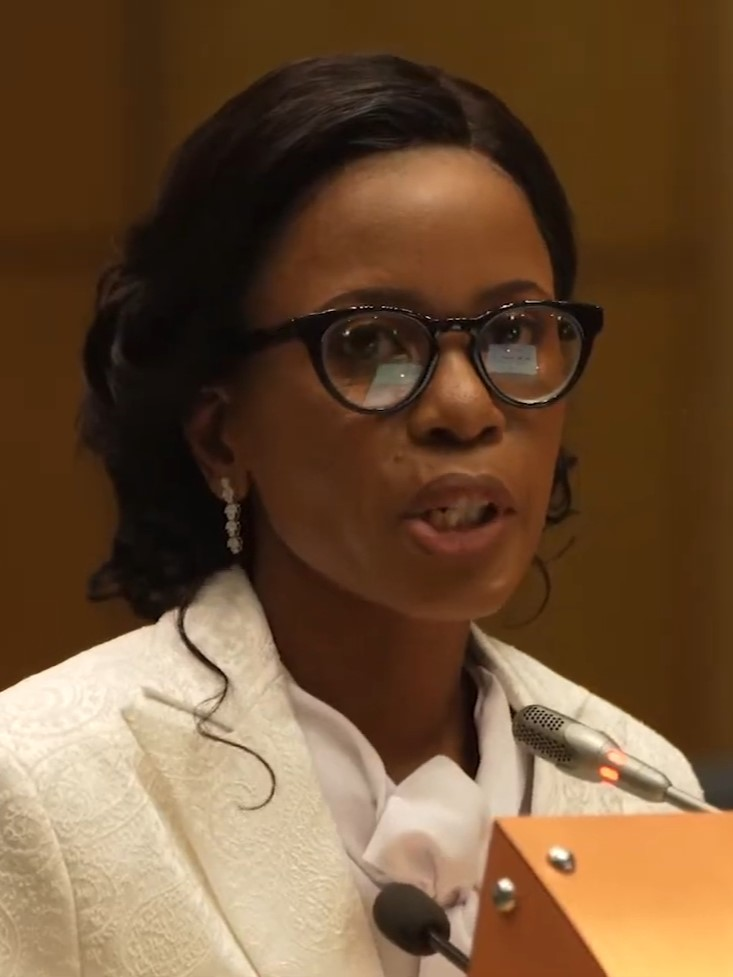
	First party	Second party	Third party
			UDC
Candidate	Edwin Dikoloti	Peggy Serame	Gaone Seleka
Party	Independent	BDP	UDC
Popular vote	12,294	7,143	6,513
Percentage	45.06%	26.18%	23.87%
MP before election
Constituency established
Elected MP
Edwin Dikoloti
Independent

The 2024 Botswana general election in Goodhope-Mmathethe was held on 30 October 2024 as part of the 2024 Botswana general election. It was the first parliamentary election in the newly delimited constituency of Goodhope-Mmathethe. The seat was won by Edwin Dikoloti, a former Botswana Democratic Party (BDP) MP and cabinet minister, who contested as an independent after being removed from the BDP ticket.

The contest became one of the most prominent constituency races of the election because it combined a high-profile BDP candidate-selection dispute, the candidacy of finance minister Peggy Serame, succession dynamics resulting in the election of Botswana's only independent MP in 2024.

== Background ==
=== Delimitation ===
Goodhope-Mmathethe was created ahead of the 2024 general election following the 2022 delimitation exercise, which increased the number of elected parliamentary constituencies from 57 to 61 and altered several constituency and council ward boundaries. The constituency combined the former Goodhope-Mabule constituency with part of the former Mmathethe-Molapowabojang constituency and its boundaries corresponded to the newly created Goodhope District Council.

In the 2019 Botswana general election, both predecessor constituencies had been won by the BDP. Eric Molale won Goodhope-Mabule, while Dikoloti won Mmathethe-Molapowabojang. Dikoloti was subsequently appointed to cabinet and served as Minister of Health during the 12th Parliament.

== BDP primary ==
=== Primary election ===
The BDP primary was held on 27 July. Dikoloti, the sitting MP for Mmathethe-Molapowabojang, sought the BDP nomination for the new seat. Serame, then Minister of Finance and Economic Development and a specially elected MP, also sought the nomination.

BDP primary election 2024: Goodhope-Mmathethe
Party	Candidate	Votes	%
BDP	Edwin Dikoloti	5,839	57.26%
BDP	Peggy Serame	4,358	42.74%
Total votes		10,197	100.00%

Dikoloti defeated Serame in the primary by 1,481 votes. Serame appealed the result and the dispute became increasingly controversial after allegations were made about the handling of ballot boxes and the party's internal procedures.

=== Central committee intervention ===
The dispute unfolded against a broader change in the BDP's 2024 bulela ditswe (primary) system. Although delayed primaries and post-primary appeals were not unusual in BDP internal contests, the 2024 primaries were distinguished by a stricter vetting system under which the BDP Central Committee approved or disqualified prospective candidates before they could contest party primaries. Critics argued that the system gave the party leadership significant influence over candidate selection and raised concerns that candidates could be excluded for political reasons or that favoured incumbents could be protected from competitive primary challenges.

The BDP Central Committee later bypassed a rerun, citing time constraints before nomination day and nominated Serame as the official party candidate under party rules allowing the central party to choose a candidate where primaries were considered unworkable. Dikoloti challenged the party's decision in court and was later suspended by President Mokgweetsi Masisi for 60 days on 25 September.

== Candidates ==
=== Edwin Dikoloti ===
After being removed from the BDP ticket, Dikoloti declined approaches from opposition parties and chose to contest the election as an independent candidate. He retained a local support base, particularly in areas of the former Mmathethe-Molapowabojang constituency where he had previously served as MP.

=== Peggy Serame ===
Serame's nomination gave the BDP a high-profile national candidate. The Goodhope-Mmathethe contest also took place in the context of succession politics within the BDP. Since the resignation of President Quett Masire in 1998, Botswana's vice presidents had assumed the presidency before the next general election, giving them a period of incumbency before seeking a public mandate. This precedent followed the introduction of presidential term limits in 1997 and Masire's resignation ahead of the 1999 general election.

Serame was widely viewed as Masisi's preferred successor as opposed to then vice-president Slumber Tsogwane. Academics later wrote that Masisi sought to "parachute" Serame into the new constituency after Eric Molale's retirement, but that Dikoloti was "in no mood to stand aside".

=== Opposition and minor candidates ===
The UDC nominated Gaone Seleka. Seleka argued that the BDP dispute created an opening for the opposition and campaigned on local development issues, including infrastructure, water shortages, unemployment, healthcare and education. The Botswana Congress Party (BCP) nominated Lesego Gatogang, while the Botswana Patriotic Front (BPF) nominated Mogomotsi Kaboeamodimo.

== Campaign ==
The campaign was short as Dikoloti was suspended five weeks before the general election. Serame campaigned as the official BDP candidate and as a senior cabinet minister, while Dikoloti ran as an independent with support from voters who opposed the party's decision to remove him from the ticket. The split in the BDP vote created a possible opening for the UDC, whose campaign focused on local service-delivery and development issues.

The dispute also changed the character of the constituency race. Instead of a straightforward contest between the BDP and the UDC, Goodhope-Mmathethe became a three-way race in which the BDP had to defend an official candidate against both the national opposition and a former BDP MP with an established local base.

== Results ==
Dikoloti defeated Serame by a majority of 5,151 votes, or 18.9 pp, and became the second MP to be elected as an independent in Botswana electoral history. Due to the constituency being the most populous in the country, Dikoloti received the second-highest raw vote total in the general election, behind Karabo Gare in Moshupa-Manyana. If Dikoloti's former Mmathethe-Molapowabojang seat is treated as the direct predecessor constituency, Serame's percentage-point difference from the 2019 general election was 41.15 pp – the harshest swing suffered by the BDP in 2024.

General election 2024: Goodhope-Mmathethe
Party	Candidate	Votes	%
Independent	Edwin Dikoloti	12,294	45.06
BDP	Peggy Serame	7,143	26.18
UDC	Gaone Seleka	6,513	23.87
BCP	Lesego Gatogang	878	3.22
BPF	Mogomotsi Kaboeamodimo	458	1.68
Margin of victory		5,151	18.88
Total valid votes		27,286	98.08
Rejected ballots		535	1.92
Turnout		27,821	83.46
Registered electors		33,333	
Independent notional gain from BDP			

== Aftermath ==
Dikoloti's victory was widely noted because independent candidates have rarely won parliamentary seats in Botswana. Mmegi described the result as the second successful independent parliamentary candidacy in Botswana, after Nehemiah Modubule won Lobatse as an independent in 2009. Sunday Standard also noted the Modubule precedent, while arguing that Dikoloti's case was distinct because he had made a clearer break from his former party before the election. Dikoloti was the only member of the preceding Masisi cabinet to also serve in the Boko cabinet.

The result formed part of the wider collapse of BDP parliamentary dominance in 2024. Nationally, the BDP lost power for the first time since independence and won only four of the 61 directly elected parliamentary seats. That day, the UDC also took control of Goodhope District Council.

== See also ==
- 2024 Botswana general election
- Goodhope-Mmathethe
- Edwin Dikoloti
- Peggy Serame
