= Kagiso Mmusi =

Botswana politician (born 1965)

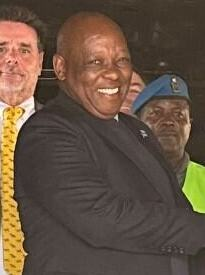

Minister of Defence and Security
- In office 2022–2024
- President: Mokgweetsi Masisi
- Preceded by: Office established

Minister of Defence, Justice and Security
- In office 2019–2022
- President: Mokgweetsi Masisi
- Preceded by: Shaw Kgathi
- Succeeded by: Office abolished

Member of Parliament for Gabane-Mmankgodi
- Incumbent
- Assumed office 23 October 2019

Personal details
- Born: October 25, 1965 (age 60)
- Citizenship: Botswana
- Party: Botswana Democratic Party
- Occupation: Politician

Thomas Kagiso Mmusi (born 25 October 1965) is a Botswana politician and businessman that served as the Minister of Defence and Security from 2022 to 2024. Prior to this, he was the Minister of Defence, Justice and Security from 2019 to 2022. He is the son of Peter Mmusi, Vice President of Botswana from 1983 to 1992.

== Career ==
Mmusi attended the Management Development Programme at the University of Cape Town Business School, and he founded the holding company Pula Holdings. He was asked to stand for Parliament following the death of his father in 1994, but he declined to pursue business. In 2008, he served on the Botswana Democratic Party finance committee, and he was chosen as the party's deputy treasurer. In the 2019 general election, Mmusi was elected as MP for Gabane-Mmankgodi with 12,204 votes out of 19,209 votes cast. After his election, Mmusi was chosen as Minister of Defence, Justice and Security in the cabinet of President Mokgweetsi Masisi.

While speaking at a police conference in February 2022, Mmusi encouraged police forces to show less restraint in response to rising crime and to "eliminate" criminals. The statement was made shortly after a random attack on cabinet minister Edwin Dikoloti. One week after the statement was made, state security controversially killed 10 suspects of a robbery. Mmusi clarified his statement in March 2022, emphasizing vigilance rather than aggression.

In 2022, the Ministry of Justice was created as a new ministry, and Mmusi was designated as the Minister of Defence and Security.
