= Next Botswana general election =

- By October 2029 (Note: Under section 91(3) of the Constitution of Botswana, Parliament is automatically dissolved five years after its first sitting unless dissolved earlier, giving a dissolution date of 7 November 2029. Section 90(3) requires a general election within 60 days of dissolution, giving a deadline of 6 January 2030. As this falls on a Sunday, the deadline extends to Monday, 7 January under section 40(5) of the Interpretation Act, which extends a statutory or constitutional deadline falling on a Sunday to the next day that is neither a Sunday nor a public holiday. However, due to long-standing political convention, all but one previous general elections in Botswana have been held in October, making it highly likely that the next election will occur that month.)

61 of the 69 seats in the National Assembly (Note: Eight of the seats in the 69-member legislature are not directly elected by the voters. Out of these eight seats, six are 'specially-elected' members appointed by the president and approved by the National Assembly. The remaining two seats are occupied by the Speaker and the President as ex-officio members.) 31 seats needed for a majority
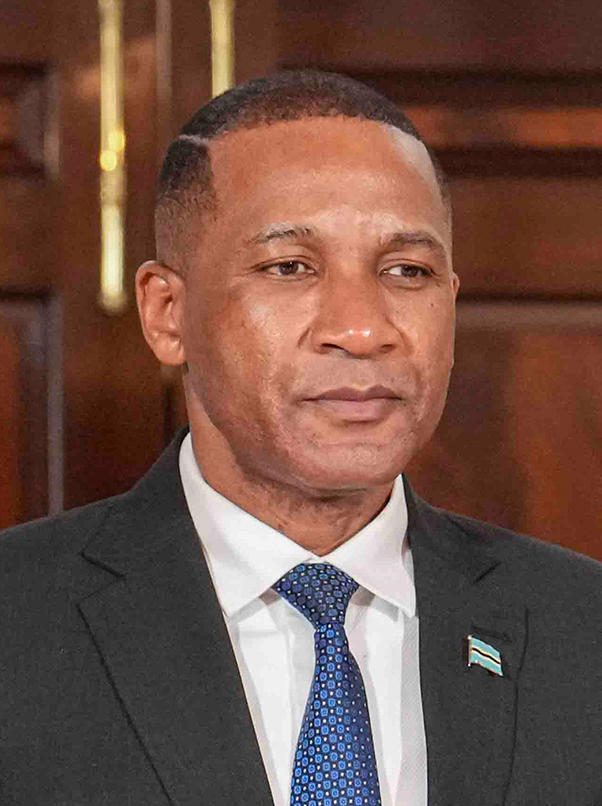

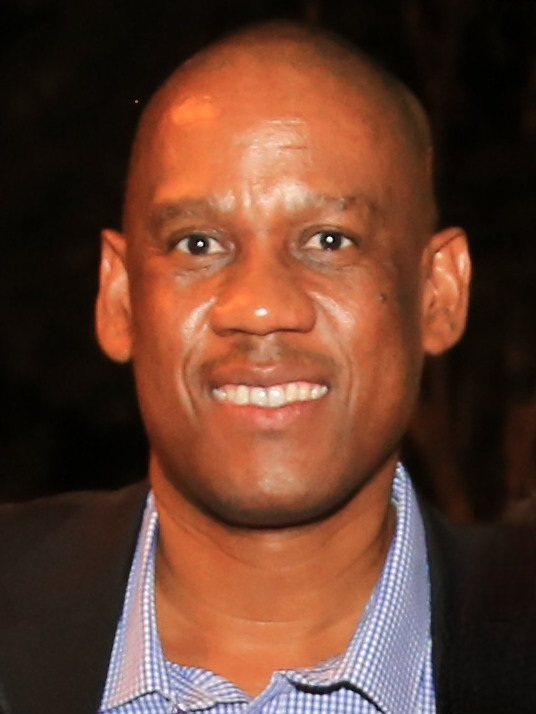

Leader	Duma Boko	Dumelang Saleshando
Party	UDC	BCP
Leader's seat	None (Note: Incumbent presidents are ineligible to contest National Assembly seats; instead, they serve as ex-officio members of Parliament.)	Maun North
Last election	37.21%, 36 seats	21.06%, 15 seats
Current seats	36	15
Seats needed	Steady	▲16
	BPF
Leader	Lawrence Ookeditse	Mpho Balopi
Party	BPF	BDP
Leader's seat	Nata-Gweta	None
Last election	8.26%, 5 seats	30.47%, 4 seats
Current seats	5	4
Seats needed	▲26	▲27
Incumbent President
Duma Boko
UDC

The next Botswana general election must be held no later than 7 January 2030, following the dissolution of the 13th Parliament of Botswana to renew the composition of the National Assembly and local councils, last elected on 30 October 2024.

Voters will elect 61 members to the National Assembly and 609 members to local councils across the country under the first-past-the-post voting system, in which all members are elected from single-member constituencies.

By to long-standing convention, general elections are held in October, meaning the next general election is likely to be held in October 2029. However, an election could be called earlier if the President dissolves Parliament for a snap election or if the government loses a vote on a supply bill or a motion of no confidence.

== Background ==
The election held on 30 October 2024 saw the Botswana Democratic Party (BDP) lose power for the first time in nearly six decades after being resoundingly defeated by the Umbrella for Democratic Change (UDC). In one of the worst defeats of a governing party in the Commonwealth, the BDP lost 90% of its parliamentary representation and was reduced to a rump of four seats out of 61, making it the smallest of the four parties represented in the National Assembly. The opposition alliance, UDC, emerged victorious by securing a majority of the directly elected seats in the National Assembly.

== Composition of Parliament ==
The table below shows the composition of the National Assembly as elected in the 2024 general election, as well as its current composition.

Name		Ideology	Political position	Leader	2024 result		Current seats
Name		Ideology	Political position	Leader	Percentage (%)	Seats	Current seats
UDC	Umbrella for Democratic Change	Social democracy Left-wing populism	Centre-left to left-wing	Duma Boko	37.21	36 / 61	36 / 61
BCP	Botswana Congress Party	Social democracy	Centre-left	Dumelang Saleshando	21.06	15 / 61	15 / 61
BPF	Botswana Patriotic Front	Populism; Pro-Ian Khama	Big tent	Lawrence Ookeditse	8.26	5 / 61	5 / 61
BDP	Botswana Democratic Party	Paternalistic conservatism	Centre to centre-right	Mpho Balopi	30.47	4 / 61	4 / 61
Independents					2.36	1 / 61	1 / 61

== Electoral system ==
For the next general election, the membership of the National Assembly consists of 61 MPs elected in single-member constituencies by first-past-the-post voting, six members appointed by the governing party and two ex-officio members (the President and the Speaker).

Voters are required to be citizens of Botswana and at least 18 years old and have been resident in the country for at least 12 months prior to voter registration. People who are declared insane, hold dual citizenship, under a death sentence, convicted of an electoral offence or imprisoned for at least six months are not allowed to vote. Candidates have to be citizens of Botswana, at least 21 years old, without an undischarged bankruptcy and be able to speak and read English sufficiently well to take part in parliamentary proceedings. They must also obtain a nomination from at least two voters in their constituency and the support of seven. A deposit is required, which is refunded if the candidate receives at least 5% of the vote in the constituency. Members of the Ntlo ya Dikgosi (House of Chiefs) cannot stand for election to the National Assembly.

The president is indirectly elected for a five-year term by the National Assembly. Since 1997, presidents are limited to a maximum of ten years in office, whether consecutive or not. The president's survival is dependent on whether their government has the support of a simple majority of the National Assembly MPs. He can be removed by a motion of no confidence, prompting their resignation or if not, the dissolution of parliament if the president refuses to do so.

During the general election campaign, all candidates for the National Assembly declare whom they endorse for President when they lodge their nomination papers. If a party or alliance secures an absolute majority of elected MPs in the legislative elections, its presidential candidate–always the party or alliance's leader–becomes president without the need for an investiture vote. In practice, since legislative elections are conducted through first-past-the-post voting, this has been the norm, with Botswana always having majority governments ever since the inaugural election in 1965.

In the event that no candidate secures a simple majority, the National Assembly elects the president through secret ballot, with a simple majority of the total number of MPs (excluding 'specially-elected' MPs) required to win. This election is limited to candidates who have the support of at least 10 MPs. If, after three rounds of voting, no candidate is elected, two additional rounds may be authorized by the speaker, if it is deemed that a successful election remains possible. Should these rounds also fail to produce a winner, or if the speaker declines to authorize further rounds, the National Assembly will be dissolved, and new elections will be held.
