= Ministry of Minerals and Energy (Botswana) =

Government ministry of Botswana

The Ministry of Minerals, Green Technology, and Energy Security (MMGE) is a ministry within the Cabinet of Botswana. The current minister is Bogolo Kenewendo. She was appointed by President Duma Boko on November 14th, 2024. The Ministry is made up of 6 departments/sections including the Department of Corporate Services, Department of Mines, Department of Energy, Mineral Affairs Division, Diamond Hub, and Projects & Energy Development Unit. The Ministry of Minerals and Energy holds massive importance in Botswana as Botswana is the world’s leading producer of diamonds by value.

This sector contributes to 80 percent of foreign exchange earnings in Botswana, but is heavily influenced by global demand. Largely due to increased costs, long term trends have shown a decline of mineral revenues especially in the diamond industry. The diamond industry was hit hard by the COVID-19 pandemic as global demand for diamonds revenues decreased significantly. Despite a short increase in 2021/2022 driven by the United States, the industry continues to see diminishing returns. This has been attributed to subdued demand, falling prices, and growing competition in synthetic diamonds.

Debswana Diamond Company currently operates almost 100% of all diamond mines in Botswana and a joint venture of Botswana and De Beers. Debswana currently sells 75% of its output to De Beers. However, De Beers' Rough Diamond Sales has seen major declines over the years.

2024	US$ 1.95 billion
2023	US$ 3.63 billion
2022	US$ 5.67 billion
2021	US$ 4.82 billion
2020	US$ 2.79 billion
2019	US$ 4.04 billion

Due to these global declines, The Ministry of Minerals and Energy is pursuing more investments in the industry through the exploration and exploitation of non-diamond minerals. The MMGE is looking to diversify the mineral sector from its diamond dependency through increased mining of copper, nickel, silver, coal, manganese, soda ash, gold, semi-precious stones, and granite. Additionally, there are untapped reserves of uranium, lead, and zinc that companies are seeking to exploit.

== Departments/Sections and Key Functions ==
- Department of Corporate Services
  - The Department of Corporate Services aims to support the Ministry’s main mission, instill a culture of excellence, and provide high-quality support services by managing its resources efficiently and adhering to best management practices.
- Department of Mines
  - The Department of Mines is dedicated to ensuring that mineral resources are prospected, developed, and exploited sustainably. It aims to enhance socio-economic and financial benefits to Botswana from mineral exploitation and oversees compliance with all relevant legislation related to prospecting and mining activities.
- Department of Energy
  - The Department of Energy serves as the government's principal authority on all matters related to energy supply and demand management. It is responsible for formulating and coordinating national energy policies and programs, and facilitating the provision of effective, reliable, and affordable energy services to customers in an environmentally sustainable way
- Mineral Affairs Division
  - The Mineral Affairs Division is the government's primary authority on all matters concerning mining and mineral sector development. It handles the formulation, implementation, and monitoring of policies for the mining and minerals sector, including sub-sectors. Additionally, the division collects market intelligence and promotes investment in minerals.
- Diamond Hub
  - The Diamond Hub coordinates the development of diamond beneficiation industries. It administers the implementation of the Kimberley Process requirements and provides business development services while regulating diamond beneficiation operations.
- Projects & Energy Development Unit

== Ministers ==
- Lefoko Maxwell Moagi (6 November 2019-)
