= Boko cabinet =

Government of Botswana since 2024

- 17th Cabinet of Botswana
- 1 November 2024 – present
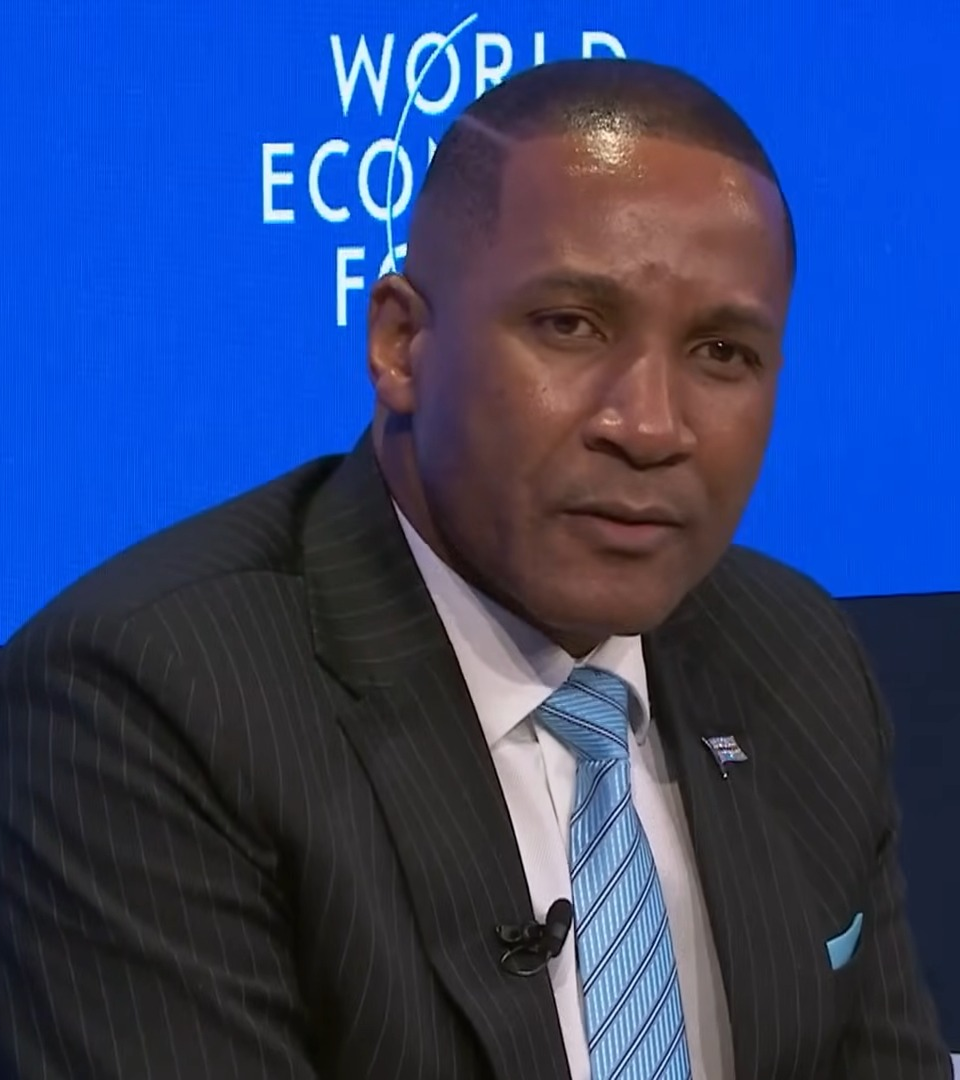

People and organisations
- President: Duma Boko
- Vice-President: Ndaba Gaolathe
- No. of ministers: 18
- Total no. of members: 28
- Member parties: Umbrella for Democratic Change; Botswana National Front; Alliance for Progressives; Botswana People's Party; Independents (Note: MPs with no political party but who are affiliated with and were elected under the Umbrella for Democratic Change banner.); Specially-elected MPs; Independent (Note: Edwin Dikoloti, MP for Goodhope-Mmathethe.); Botswana Patriotic Front
- Status in legislature: Majority government (coalition)
- Opposition party: Botswana Congress Party
- Opposition leader: Dumelang Saleshando

History
- Election: 2024 general election
- Legislature term: 13th Parliament
- Predecessor: Masisi II

The Boko cabinet is the seventeenth and current cabinet of Botswana. It was formed on 1 November 2024 following the general election held on 30 October 2024, which resulted in the Botswana Democratic Party (BDP) losing power after 58 years of uninterrupted rule since independence in 1966.

== Background ==
Following the 2024 election, a three-party alliance, the Umbrella for Democratic Change, led by the Botswana National Front, secured a majority of 11 seats in the National Assembly of Botswana. The election resulted in the first electoral loss for the BDP, which became the smallest party in the National Assembly. Former president Mokgweetsi Masisi conceded defeat on the morning of 1 November 2024 and later that day Duma Boko was sworn-in into office by Chief Justice Terence Rannowane.

== Ministers ==
The ministers of the cabinet were announced by Boko on a staggered basis from the 11th to the 15th of November 2024.

| Portfolio | Minister | Took office | Left office | Party |
Office of the President
Ministry for State President, Defence and Security
| President | Duma Boko | 1 November 2024 | Incumbent | BNF |
| Vice-President | Ndaba Gaolathe | 7 November 2024 | Incumbent | AP |
| Minister for State President, Defence and Security | Moeti Mohwasa | 15 November 2024 | Incumbent | Specially-elected |
| Assistant Minister for State President, Defence and Security | Maipelo Mophuting | 15 November 2024 | Incumbent | BNF |
Ministry of Finance
| Minister of Finance | Ndaba Gaolathe | 11 November 2024 | Incumbent | AP |
Ministry of International Relations
| Minister of International Relations | Phenyo Butale | 11 November 2024 | Incumbent | AP |
Ministry of Health
| Minister of Health | Stephen Modise | 11 November 2024 | Incumbent | Specially-elected |
| Assistant Minister of Health | Lawrence Ookeditse | 11 November 2024 | Incumbent | BPF |
Ministry of Child Welfare and Basic Education
| Minister of Child Welfare and Basic Education | Nono Kgafela-Mokoka | 11 November 2024 | Incumbent | Specially-elected |
| Assistant Minister of Child Welfare and Basic Education | Justin Hunyepa | 27 March 2025 | Incumbent | BNF |
Ministry of Higher Education
| Minister of Higher Education | Prince Maele | 15 November 2024 | Incumbent | Independent |
Assistant Minister of Higher Education (position abolished)
| Assistant Minister of Higher Education (position abolished) | Justin Hunyepa | 15 November 2024 | 27 March 2025 | BNF |
Ministry of Lands and Agriculture
| Minister of Lands and Agriculture | Micus Chimbombi | 11 November 2024 | 26 July 2025 (Note: Died in office.) | BNF |
| Minister of Lands and Agriculture | Edwin Dikoloti | 4 June 2026 | Incumbent | Independent |
| Assistant Minister of Lands and Agriculture | Edwin Dikoloti | March 2025 | 4 June 2026 | Independent |
| Assistant Minister of Lands and Agriculture | Motsamai Motsamai | 4 June 2026 | Incumbent | BNF |
Ministry of Youth and Gender Affairs
| Minister of Youth and Gender Affairs | Lesego Chombo | 11 November 2024 | Incumbent | Specially-elected |
Ministry of Justice and Correctional Services
| Minister of Justice and Correctional Services | Nelson Ramaotwana | 14 November 2024 | Incumbent | BNF |
| Assistant Minister of Justice and Correctional Services | Augustine Nyatanga | 14 November 2024 | Incumbent | BNF |
Ministry of Local Government and Traditional Affairs
| Minister of Local Government and Traditional Affairs | Ketlhalefile Motshegwa | 14 November 2024 | Incumbent | BNF |
| Assistant Minister of Local Government and Traditional Affairs | Ignatius Moswaane | 14 November 2024 | Incumbent | BPP |
Ministry of Minerals and Energy
| Minister of Minerals and Energy | Bogolo Kenewendo | 14 November 2024 | Incumbent | Specially-elected |
Ministry of Communications and Innovation
| Minister of Communications and Innovation | David Tshere | 14 November 2024 | Incumbent | Independent |
| Assistant Minister of Communications and Innovation | Shawn Nthaile | 14 November 2024 | Incumbent | BNF |
Ministry of Environment and Tourism
| Minister of Environment and Tourism | Wynter Mmolotsi | 15 November 2024 | Incumbent | AP |
Ministry of Labour and Home Affairs
| Minister of Labour and Home Affairs | Pius Mokgware | 14 November 2024 | Incumbent | Specially-elected |
Ministry of Sports and Arts
| Minister of Sports and Arts | Jacob Kelebeng | 15 November 2024 | Incumbent | AP |
Ministry of Trade and Entrepreneurship
| Minister of Trade and Entrepreneurship | Tiroeaone Ntsima | 14 November 2024 | Incumbent | BPP |
| Assistant Minister of Trade and Entrepreneurship | Baratiwa Mathoothe | 14 November 2024 | Incumbent | BPF |
Ministry of Transport and Infrastructure
| Minister of Transport and Infrastructure | Noah Salakae | 15 November 2024 | 18 August 2026 | BNF |
| Minister of Transport and Infrastructure | Keoagile Atamelang | 19 August 2026 | Incumbent | BPP |
| Assistant Minister of Transport and Infrastructure | Keoagile Atamelang | 15 November 2024 | 19 August 2026 | BPP |
| Assistant Minister of Transport and Infrastructure | Letlhogonolo Barongwang | 19 August 2026 | Incumbent | BNF |
Ministry of Water and Human Settlement
| Minister of Water and Human Settlement | Onneetse Ramogapi | 15 November 2024 | Incumbent | Independent |
| Assistant Minister of Water and Human Settlement (position abolished) | Motsamai Motsamai | 15 November 2024 | 4 June 2026 | BNF |

== See also ==
- 13th Parliament of Botswana
- 2024 Botswana general election
