= Emma Peloetletse =

Botswanan politician

Permanent Secretary to the President of Botswana
- In office September 1, 2021 – March 31, 2026
- President: Mokgweetsi Masisi Duma Boko

Personal details
- Born: Botswana
- Party: Botswana Democratic Party

Emma Peloetletse is a Motswana politician. She served as Permanent Secretary to the President of Botswana, from 2021 to 2026, having been appointed by Mokgweetsi Masisi, 5th President of Botswana.

Awards and achievements
Preceded by	Minister of Permanent Secretary to the President of Botswana	Succeeded by
