= Cabinet of Botswana =

National cabinet of Botswana

The Cabinet of Botswana consists of the President, Vice President and all the Ministers and assistant ministers, the permanent secretary and deputy permanent secretary to the president and cabinet.

== Current cabinet ==
The ministers of the cabinet were announced by Duma Boko on a staggered basis from the 11th to the 15th of November 2024.

Portfolio	Minister	Took office	Left office	Party
Office of the President
President.	Duma Boko	1 November 2024	Incumbent	BNF
Vice-Presidency
Vice-President	Ndaba Gaolathe	7 November 2024	Incumbent	AP
Ministry of Finance
Minister of Finance	Ndaba Gaolathe	11 November 2024	Incumbent	AP
Ministry of International Relations
Minister of International Relations	Phenyo Butale	11 November 2024	Incumbent	AP
Ministry of Health
Minister of Health	Stephen Modise	11 November 2024	Incumbent	BNF
Assistant Minister of Health	Lawrence Ookeditse	11 November 2024	Incumbent	BPF
Ministry of Child Welfare and Basic Education
Minister of Child Welfare and Basic Education	Nono Kgafela-Mokoka	11 November 2024	Incumbent	BPP
Ministry of Higher Education
Minister of Higher Education	Prince Maele	15 November 2024	Incumbent	Independent
Assistant Minister of Higher Education	Justin Hunyepa	15 November 2024	Incumbent	BNF
Ministry of Lands and Agriculture
Minister of Lands and Agriculture	Edwin Dikoloti (acting)	26 July 2025	Incumbent	BNF
Assistant Minister of Lands and Agriculture	Edwin Dikoloti	11 November 2024	Incumbent	Independent
Ministry of Youth and Gender Affairs
Minister of Youth and Gender Affairs	Lesego Chombo	11 November 2024	Incumbent	Independent
Ministry of State Presidency
Minister of State Presidency	Moeti Mohwasa	15 November 2024	Incumbent	BNF
Assistant Minister of State Presidency	Maipelo Mophuting	15 November 2024	Incumbent	BNF
Ministry of Justice and Correctional Services
Minister of Justice and Correctional Services	Nelson Ramaotwana	14 November 2024	Incumbent	BNF
Assistant Minister of Justice and Correctional Services	Augustine Nyatanga	14 November 2024	Incumbent	BNF
Ministry of Local Government and Traditional Affairs
Minister of Local Government and Traditional Affairs	Ketlhalefile Motshegwa	14 November 2024	Incumbent	BNF
Assistant Minister of Local Government and Traditional Affairs	Ignatius Moswaane	14 November 2024	Incumbent	BPP
Ministry of Minerals and Energy
Minister of Minerals and Energy	Bogolo Kenewendo	14 November 2024	Incumbent	Independent
Ministry of Communications and Innovation
Minister of Communications and Innovation	David Tshere	14 November 2024	Incumbent	Independent
Assistant Minister of Communications and Innovation	Shawn Nthaile	14 November 2024	Incumbent	BNF
Ministry of Environment and Tourism
Minister of Environment and Tourism	Wynter Mmolotsi	15 November 2024	Incumbent	AP
Ministry of Labour and Home Affairs
Minister of Labour and Home Affairs	Pius Mokgware	14 November 2024	Incumbent	AP
Ministry of Sports and Arts
Minister of Sports and Arts	Jacob Kelebeng	15 November 2024	Incumbent	AP
Ministry of Trade and Entrepreneurship
Minister of Trade and Entrepreneurship	Tiroeaone Ntsima	14 November 2024	Incumbent	BPP
Assistant Minister of Trade and Entrepreneurship	Baratiwa Mathoothe	14 November 2024	Incumbent	BPF
Ministry of Transport and Infrastructure
Minister of Transport and Infrastructure	Keoagile Atamelang	21 August 2026	Incumbent	BPP
Assistant Minister of Transport and Infrastructure	Letlhogonolo Barongwang	21 August 2026	Incumbent	BNF
Ministry of Water and Human Settlement
Minister of Water and Human Settlement	Onneetse Ramogapi	15 November 2024	Incumbent	Independent
Assistant Minister of Water and Human Settlement	Motsamai Motsamai	15 November 2024	Incumbent	BNF

== See also ==
- Politics of Botswana
