= Ministry of Defence and Security (Botswana) =

Government ministry of Botswana

Ministry overview
- Jurisdiction: Government of Botswana
- Minister responsible: Kagiso Mmusi
- Website: Official website

The Ministry of Defence and Security of Botswana aims to provide safety, protection and promote human rights and rule of law via the implementation of pertinent policies and programming in order to achieve peace and tranquility. The ministry oversees the following departments:

- Botswana Defence Force
- Botswana Prison Service
- Attorney General's Chambers
- Botswana Police Service

== List of ministers ==
=== Minister of Defence, Justice and Security ===
No.	Portrait	Name (born–died)	Term of office			Political party	Government	Ref.
No.	Portrait	Name (born–died)	Took office	Left office	Time in office	Political party	Government	Ref.
		Dikgakgamatso Ndelu Seretse (1958–2021)	2008	2010	1–2 years		Khama	
		Lesego Motsumi* (c. 1956–2023)	2010	2011	0–1 years		Khama	
		Dikgakgamatso Ndelu Seretse (1958–2021)	2012	2014	1–2 years		Khama	
		Shaw Kgathi (born 1961)	2014	2019	4–5 years	Botswana Democratic Party	Khama; Masisi II	
		Kagiso Mmusi (born 1965)	2019	2022	2–3 years	Botswana Democratic Party		

*She is identified as the Acting Minister of Defence, Justice and Security in various sources.

=== Minister of Defence and Security ===
No.	Portrait	Name (born–died)	Term of office			Political party	Government	Ref.
No.	Portrait	Name (born–died)	Took office	Left office	Time in office	Political party	Government	Ref.
		Kagiso Mmusi (born 1965)	2022	17 October 2024	1–2 years	Botswana Democratic Party		

== See also ==
- Politics of Botswana
- Government of Botswana
- Ministry of defence
- List of current defence ministers
- List of female defence ministers
