= Bogolo Kenewendo =

Motswana economist and politician (born 1987)

The Honourable Bogolo Kenewendo
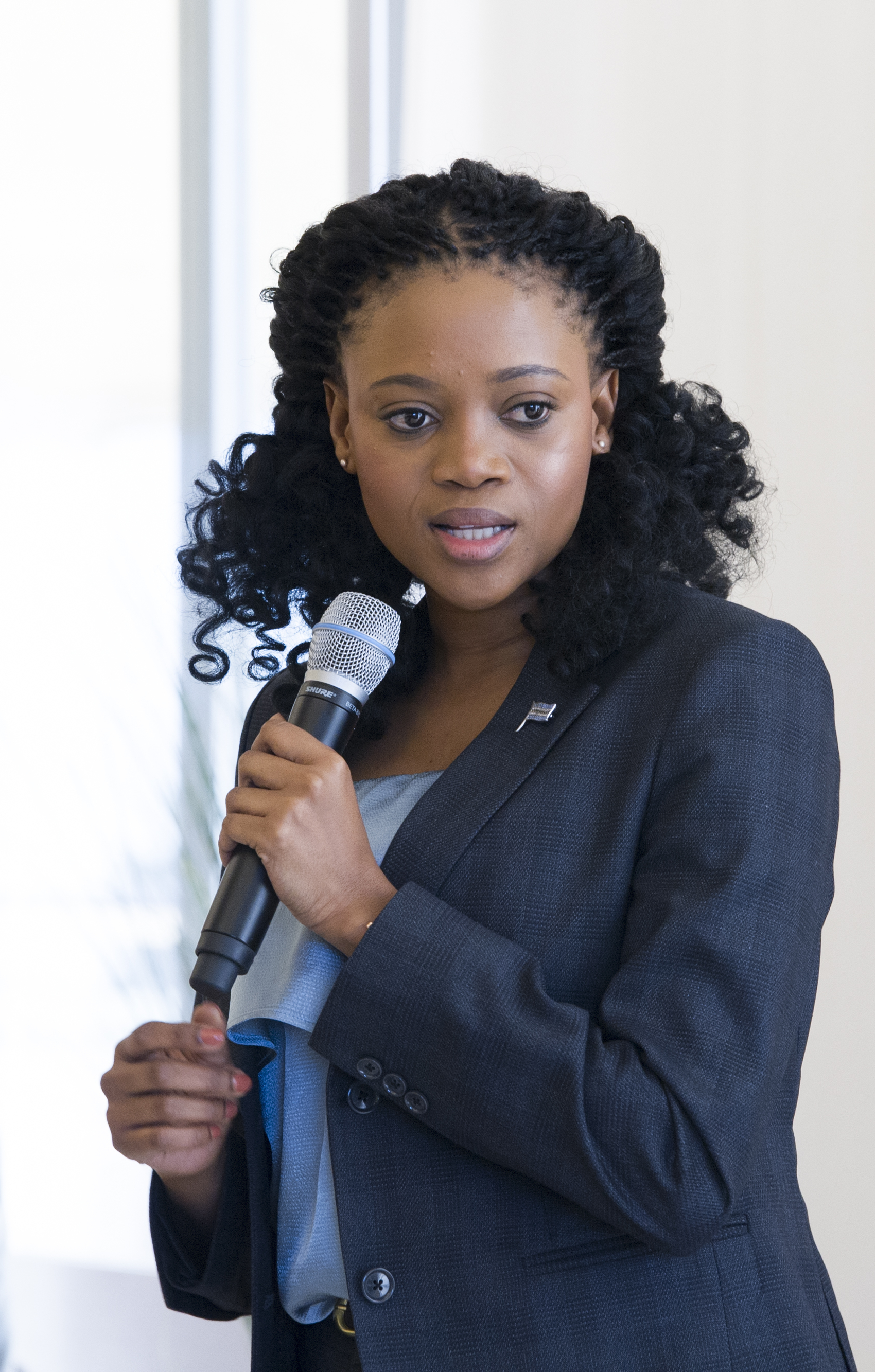
- Bogolo Kenewendo at the World Investment Forum 2018

Minister of Minerals and Energy
- Incumbent
- Assumed office 14 November 2024
- President: Duma Boko
- Preceded by: Lefoko Maxwell Moagi

Special Advisor and Africa Director to the United Nations Climate Change High-Level Champions
- Incumbent
- Assumed office June 2022
- High-Level Champions: Razan Al Mubarak; Mahmoud Mohieldin; Nigel Topping

Minister of Investment, Trade and Industry
- In office 4 April 2018 – 6 November 2019
- President: Mokgweetsi Masisi
- Vice President: Slumber Tsogwane
- Succeeded by: Peggy Serame

Member of the United Nations Secretary-General’s High-level Panel on Digital Cooperation
- In office 12 July 2018 – November 2019
- Secretary-General: António Guterres
- Co-chairs: Melinda Gates Jack Ma

Member of the Parliament of Botswana
- In office 27 October 2016 – 04 April 2018
- President: Ian Khama

Personal details
- Born: 1987 (age 38–39) Botswana
- Education: University of Botswana (Bachelor of Arts in Economics); University of Sussex (Master of Science in International Economics)
- Occupation: Economist and politician
- Website: https://www.kenewendo.com/

Bogolo Joy Kenewendo (born c. 1987) is a Motswana economist and politician. She serves as a Specially Elected Member of Parliament in the Botswana Parliament as of November 2024, she is the incumbent Minister of Minerals and Energy in the current administration after serving as Cabinet Minister of Investment, Trade and Industry of Botswana under President Mokgweetsi Masisi. After being dropped from cabinet in November 2019 she has served as the managing director of Kenewendo Advisory, based in Gaborone, Botswana. She leads Molaya Kgosi Women Leadership and Mentorship Program and the Board Chair of Molaya Kgosi Trust.

In June 2022, Kenewendo was appointed as Special Advisor and Africa Director to the United Nations Climate Change High-Level Champions.

== Background and education ==
Kenewendo was born in Motopi Village in the Boteti Area, in Botswana circa 1987. After attending primary school, she enrolled in Pitzer College in Botswana. She was then admitted to the University of Botswana, graduating with a Bachelor of Arts in Economics. Later, she obtained a Master of Science in International Economics from the University of Sussex in the United Kingdom. She is also a certified project manager. She received training in Economic Freedom Philosophy from the Foundation for Economic Education.

== Career before politics ==
After her postgraduate studies at the University of Sussex in the United Kingdom as Chevening Scholar, earning an Msc International Economics, Kenewendo worked as a trade economist ODI Fellow in the Ghanaian Ministry of Trade and Industry. She also served as an economic consultant at Econsult Botswana, a Gaborone-based think tank.

== Political career ==
In 2016, the then president of Botswana, Ian Khama, nominated Kenewendo to the Parliament of Botswana, where she was elected as a presidential nominee to parliament. On 4 April 2018, the new incoming president, Mokgweetsi Masisi, appointed Kenewendo as the new Minister of Investment, Trade and Industry.

In her capacity as minister, Kenewendo was appointed by United Nations Secretary General António Guterres in 2018 to the High-level Panel on Digital Cooperation, co-chaired by Melinda Gates and Jack Ma. As the Minister of Investment, Trade and Industry in Botswana, she implemented reforms to significantly improve the ease of doing business, open up both domestic and international markets, and position the country to succeed in the global value chains as well as the digital economy. During her tenure, she was the youngest Cabinet Minister in Africa and in Botswana’s history.

Kenewendo was cited as one of the Top 100 most influential Africans by New African magazine in 2018.

When the United Kingdom assumed the presidency of the G7 in 2021, Kenewendo was appointed by the country's Minister for Women and Equalities, Liz Truss, to a newly formed Gender Equality Advisory Council (GEAC) chaired by Sarah Sands.

The year 2024 set a different tone for Kenewendo and Botswana as she was specially elected to be a Member of Parliament under the new administration and was sworn in as minister of Minerals and Energy.

== Personal life ==
In her spare time, Kenewendo meditates, travels and reads.
