= Tlokweng (Botswana constituency) =

Parliamentary constituency in Botswana

- Single-member constituency for the National Assembly
- District: South-East
- Population: 57,143
- Electorate: 18,114
- Major settlements: Tlokweng
- Area: 285 km^{2}

Current constituency
- Created: 2004
- Party: UDC
- Created from: South-East
- MP: Phenyo Segokgo
- Margin of victory: 4,351 (29.5 pp)

Tlokweng is a constituency in the South-East District represented by Phenyo Segokgo, a UDC MP in the National Assembly of Botswana since 2024.

== Constituency profile ==
Tlokweng was created from the former South-East constituency ahead of the 2004 general election. It was contested as South East North in the 2004 and 2009 general elections, before being contested as Tlokweng from the 2014 general election onwards.

The constituency lies around Tlokweng. According to the 2022 Delimitation Commission, the constituency has a population of 57,143 and covers an area of 285 km^{2}.

The constituency has the following localities:

1. Tlokweng
2. Ruretse

== Members of Parliament ==
Key: BNF UDC BDP UDC

Election	Winner
2004 election	Olebile Gaborone
2009 election	Olebile Gaborone
2014 election	Same Bathobakae
2017 by-election	Masego Segokgo
2019 election	Thulagano Segokgo
2024 election	Phenyo Segokgo

== Election results ==
=== 2024 election ===
General election 2024: Tlokweng
Party	Candidate	Votes	%	±%
UDC	Phenyo Segokgo	8,498	57.63	+21.36
BDP	Thulagano Segokgo	4,147	28.12	−30.12
BCP	Masego Segokgo	1,948	13.21	N/A
Independent	Ian Bogatsu	153	1.04	N/A
Margin of victory		4,351	29.51	N/A
Total valid votes		14,746	99.59	−0.08
Rejected ballots		60	0.41	+0.08
Turnout		14,806	81.74	+0.07
Registered electors		18,114		
UDC gain from BDP		Swing	+25.74	

=== 2019 election ===
General election 2019: Tlokweng
Party	Candidate	Votes	%	±%
BDP	Thulagano Segokgo	7,473	58.24	+24.63
UDC	Masego Segokgo	4,654	36.27	−19.73
AP	Kgothe Bogatsu	704	5.49	N/A
Margin of victory		2,819	21.97	N/A
Total valid votes		12,831	99.67	−0.15
Rejected ballots		42	0.33	+0.15
Turnout		12,873	81.67	−1.13
Registered electors		15,763		
BDP gain from UDC		Swing	+22.18	

=== 2017 by-election ===
By-election 2017: Tlokweng
Party	Candidate	Votes	%	±%
UDC	Masego Segokgo	4,635	67.68	+11.68
BDP	Elijah Katse	2,156	31.48	−2.13
Independent	Shirley Segokgo	57	0.83	N/A
Margin of victory		2,479	36.20	+13.82
Total valid votes		6,848	99.59	−0.23
Rejected ballots		28	0.41	+0.23
Turnout		6,876		
UDC hold		Swing	+6.91	

=== 2014 election ===
General election 2014: Tlokweng
Party	Candidate	Votes	%	±%
UDC	Same Bathobakae	6,442	56.00	+14.00
BDP	Olebile Gaborone	3,867	33.61	−8.19
BCP	Phaladi Zachariah	1,195	10.39	−5.81
Margin of victory		2,575	22.38	+22.20
Total valid votes		11,504	99.82	+0.77
Rejected ballots		21	0.18	−0.77
Turnout		11,525	82.80	+2.39
Registered electors		13,919		
UDC hold		Swing	+11.10	

=== 2009 election ===
General election 2009: South East North
Party	Candidate	Votes	%	±%
BNF	Olebile Gaborone	3,824	41.99	−7.03
BDP	Elijah Katse	3,807	41.81	+4.47
BCP	Zacharia Phaladi	1,475	16.20	+2.56
Margin of victory		17	0.19	−11.50
Total valid votes		9,106	99.05	+0.02
Rejected ballots		87	0.95	−0.02
Turnout		9,193	80.41	+0.13
Registered electors		11,433		
BNF hold		Swing	−5.75	

=== 2004 election ===
General election 2004: South East North
Party	Candidate	Votes	%
BNF	Olebile Gaborone	3,243	49.02
BDP	Shirley Segokgo	2,470	37.34
BCP	John Mokgalagadi	902	13.64
Margin of victory		773	11.69
Total valid votes		6,615	99.03
Rejected ballots		65	0.97
Turnout		6,680	80.28
Registered electors		8,321	
BNF win (new seat)			
