= Lesego Motsumi =

Botswana politician (c. 17 May 1955 – 9 January 2023)

Lesego Ethel Motsumi
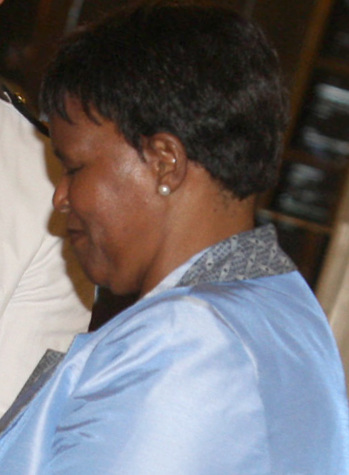
- Died: 2023/01/09; Ramotswa
- Occupation: Politician
- Children: Four Children

Lesego Ethel Motsumi (1955/56 – 9 January 2023) was a Botswana politician. She was elected to the National Assembly in 1999. She became Assistant Minister of Labour and Home Affairs from 2002 to 2003. She then became Minister of Health until November 2004, when she became the Minister of Works and Transport. In the 2008 cabinet reshuffle, held upon the appointment of then president Ian Khama, Motsumi reverted to her old post as Minister of Health, serving until 2009. She served as Minister of Presidential Affairs Governance and Public Administration from 2009 to 2011, also serving as acting Minister of Defence and Security from 2010 to 2011. From 2011 to 2019, she served as Botswana's High Commissioner to India.

Motsumi died on 9 January 2023, at the age of 67, from burns that resulted when an item exploded while she was burning refuse on 31 December 2022 at her residence in Ramotswa.

== Personal life ==
Miss Motsumi had four children and six grandchildren. In 1999 she was elected as the first female member of parliament for her constituency South East South.
