= Metsimotlhabe =

Metsimotlhabe Metsimotlhaba
- Village
- Location in Botswana
- Coordinates: 24°33′11″S 25°48′14″E
- Country: Botswana
- District: Kweneng District

Population (2011)
  - Total: 8,884

Metsimotlhabe is a village in Kweneng District of Botswana. The village is located 20 km north-west of Gaborone, along the Gaborone–Molepolole road. The population was 8,884 in 2011 census.

== Healthcare ==
The village is the home of LenMed Health Bokamoso Private Hospital, founded in 2010 and formerly known as Bokamoso hospital.

== Government ==
Metsimotlhabe is part of the Mmopane-Metsimotlhabe constituency for elections to the National Assembly of Botswana.
