= Politics of Botswana =

- Coat of arms of Botswana
- Polity type: Unitary parliamentary republic with an executive presidency
- Constitution: Constitution of Botswana

Legislative branch
- Name: Parliament of Botswana
- Type: Unicameral with an advisory body
- Meeting place: National Assembly Building, Gaborone
- Presiding officer: Dithapelo Keorapetse, Speaker

Executive branch
- Head of state and government
- Title: President
- Currently: Duma Boko
- Appointer: National Assembly
- Cabinet
- Name: Cabinet of Botswana
- Current cabinet: Boko cabinet
- Leader: President
- Deputy leader: Vice-President
- Appointer: President
- Ministries: 18

Judicial branch
- Name: Judiciary of Botswana
- High Court
- Chief judge: Gaolapelwe Ketlogetswe
- Court of Appeal
- Chief judge: Tebogo Tau

Botswana is a parliamentary republic in which the president of Botswana is both head of state and head of government. The nation's politics are based heavily on the Westminster system and on traditional Setswana chiefdom. The legislature is made up of the unicameral National Assembly and the advisory body of tribal chiefs, the Ntlo ya Dikgosi.

The president is, by convention, the leader of the political party capable of commanding the confidence of the National Assembly. Once in office, executive dominance over the legislature is structurally reinforced by the first-past-the-post electoral system, which tends to manufacture large parliamentary majorities for the governing party. This dynamic is further entrenched by a high cabinet-to-MP ratio, which leaves behind a small backbench thus weakening legislative oversight capacity as cabinet collective responsibility binds a large proportion of governing party legislators to the executive.

During the country's 58-year-long dominance of the BDP, political opposition was mostly fragmented and faced institutional challenges. These included the first-past-the-post electoral system, which tended to split the opposition vote and allowed the BDP to win many seats with only a plurality, and the lack of state-funded party funding. Factionalism and splits were frequent amongst opposition parties and they regularly held a small number of seats in the National Assembly for much of that period. These were mainly the Botswana National Front (BNF) and the Botswana Congress Party (BCP). The BNF-led Umbrella for Democratic Change (UDC) was formed in 2012 as an electoral alliance of opposition parties to pool the opposition vote in one political formation.

The first Botswana elections took place in 1965, with Botswana achieving independence from the United Kingdom in 1966. From 1966 to 2024, the BDP won every election. The BDP led by Seretse Khama formed the first government and continued winning elections every five years. Quett Masire became president following Khama's death in 1980 and the BDP was enveloped by factionalism in the 1990s. This factionalism persisted through the presidencies of Festus Mogae from 1998 to 2008 and Ian Khama from 2008 to 2018. The liberal Botswana Movement for Democracy was formed in 2010 to challenge what they saw as Khama's increasing authoritarian tendencies and was the BDP's first major splinter party. Khama's successor, Mokgweetsi Masisi, became president in 2018 and quickly entered into a strong political rivalry with Khama, which came to redefine the politics in Botswana over the following years.

Botswana has a comparatively strong human rights and democratic record in the African context; Freedom House rates the country as "Free", while Afrobarometer describes it as Africa's oldest continuous democracy, with multipartyism since independence in 1966. Economic policy in Botswana revolves around the nation's lucrative diamond industry, which accounts for around 80% of exports, one third of fiscal revenues and one quarter of GDP. The country has been praised as an economic success, combining diamond revenues with orthodox/pro-market economic policies and prudent management, although unemployment, inequality and limited diversification remain persistent challenges. Botswana has since expanded social spending and fiscal redistribution, but welfare provision remains comparatively limited and targeted, while public services and infrastructure have received substantial investment. Foreign policy in Botswana has historically emphasised multilateralism, non-alignment, peaceful resolution of conflicts and pragmatic regional engagement. Apartheid South Africa and white-minority rule in the region shaped Botswana's early foreign policy, while instability in Zimbabwe became a major regional concern from the early 2000s.

== History ==
=== Pre-statehood ===
The location of present-day Botswana was historically controlled by Bantu peoples, primarily the Tswana people. Many legal traditions practiced by the Tswana people, such as respect for traditional authority and protection of property rights, have played a role in the development of post-colonial Botswana politics. Centralised political structures developed prior to colonisation have also been retained. Politics of the Tswana people prior to statehood was often led by chiefs, who continue to have a role in Botswana politics. In the early-19th century, these chiefdoms developed into nation states. These nation states incorporated limited government and ethnic pluralism.

The United Kingdom first began influencing the region in the 1820s and the region became part of the British Empire in 1885 as the Bechuanaland Protectorate. The Tswana people were made subjects of the Crown and placed under British law. The first significant movement for independence was led by the radical Bechuanaland People's Party. The Botswana Democratic Party (BDP) was formed by Seretse Khama in 1962 as part of a negotiated independence process. Botswana became self-governing in 1965 and it became an independent republic in 1966. The United Kingdom continued to invest in the country financially and pay some of its expenses through 1971. Institutions and traditions from both precolonial Tswana society and colonial British rule were retained following independence and continue to influence the politics of Botswana.

=== Presidency of Seretse Khama ===
Upon receiving self-governance, the nation held the 1965 Bechuanaland general election, in which the BDP won a large victory. Of the 31 seats in the legislature, the BDP won 28. Three members of the Botswana People's Party made up the opposition, all elected from relatively urbanised constituencies. The government under the first president, Seretse Khama, was based heavily on collaborative governance similar to that of the pre-colonial tribal governments. Policies were often considered by several ministries and a commission before being adopted. Khama also ensured that foreign involvement was welcome, opposed to a nationalism that restricted opportunity.

While Khama was president, his vice president, Quett Masire, held considerable power as well. In addition to being the vice president, he was the minister of finance and he was the secretary general of the BDP. He oversaw a series of National Development Plans that dispensed much of the government's policies. Regional instability prompted the creation of a military, the Botswana Defence Force, in 1977. Prior to this, the Botswana Police Service handled all of the nation's security responsibilities. The Botswana National Front (BNF) was founded by Kenneth Koma as a left-wing party and it became the opposition party in the 1969 general election.

=== Presidency of Quett Masire ===
Khama served as president until his death in 1980, at which point Vice President Masire became president. The opposition gained support in the 1980s and 1990s as the country urbanised and the BDP's rural political base shrank.

The Kgabo Commission, part of a corruption controversy involving Vice President Peter Mmusi and BDP Secretary General Daniel Kwelagobe, dominated the politics of Botswana in 1991 and brought about an era of factionalism in the BDP. Mmusi's resignation led to Festus Mogae being chosen as the next vice president. The incident firmly established a growing factional conflict within the BDP. Mmusi and Kwelagobe formed one faction, the Big Two. Mompati Merafhe and his supporters—namely David Magang, Bahiti Temane, Roy Blackbeard and Chapson Butale—formed an opposing faction, the Big Five. Merafhe later took on Jacob Nkate as his closest ally and they dubbed themselves the 'A-Team'. The Big Two appealed the findings of the commission in court, but they were ultimately suspended from parliament. Their supporters then gained power after the 1994 general election. Amid this inter-party conflict, the BNF became a significantly stronger opposition, winning thirteen seats. Kwelagobe aligned with Ponatshego Kedikilwe following Mmusi's death and they renamed themselves the Barata-Phathi.

After the BDP's poor performance in the 1994 election, South African academic Lawrence Schlemmer was brought in by the party to provide a political strategy. He recommended replacing the long-standing members of the BDP with newer, non-factional members, with a particular focus on the presidency. Multiple constitutional reforms were enacted in Botswana following a referendum in 1997: the vice president was designated the automatic successor of the president, the voting age was lowered to eighteen and an independent electoral commission was established. These reforms were championed by Masire, as automatic succession allowed him to anoint a successor.

=== 1998–present ===
Masire stepped down as president in 1998 and Vice President Mogae became president. He chose Ian Khama as vice president and while the two were nominally non-factional, they effectively supported the A-Team faction of Merafhe and Nkate. This caused the factional differences in the party to further escalate. A schism also formed in the oppositional BNF, which led to the creation of the Botswana Congress Party in 1998. Enough assemblymen defected that this new party became the primary opposition, but they were replaced by BNF candidates in the 1999 general election.

Mogae's tenure as president ended in 2008 and Ian Khama, the son of President Seretse Khama, became president. The BDP underwent its first split in 2010 when Khama encouraged the Barata-Phathi faction to leave the party and they formed the Botswana Movement for Democracy, led by Gomolemo Motswaledi. Freedom House lowered Botswana's rating in the 2010s as a crackdown took place against journalists.

Khama stepped down in 2018 and Vice President Mokgweetsi Masisi became president. He immediately reversed Khama's policies and replaced top officials who had been appointed by Khama. The two former allies quickly became political rivals and Khama defected from the Botswana Democratic Party. He instead aligned with the newly formed Botswana Patriotic Front in addition to supporting the Umbrella for Democratic Change. This made the 2019 general election the first competitive election in the nation's history, but the BDP remained in power with 52.7% of the total vote, winning 38 of the 57 seats in the assembly. The rivalry significantly escalated when Masisi's pursued criminal charges against Khama for illegal ownership of firearms in 2022, causing Khama to seek asylum in South Africa.

=== Opposition's rise to power ===
In the run-up to the 2024 Botswana general election, the opposition was splintered, therefore it was thought that BDP would cruise to a comfortable victory again. Despite this division, opposition UDC was able to gain an outright majority of seats in the parliament and Duma Boko was elected to the Presidency. The BDP was relegated to last (fifth) place in terms of seats. Masisi peacefully conceded defeat and handed over power to the opposition.

== National government ==
Botswana is a parliamentary republic governed by the Constitution of Botswana. The constitution has been in effect since Botswana became independent from the United Kingdom on 30 September 1966. This makes it the longest uninterrupted democracy in Africa. Botswana operates under a blend of Roman-Dutch law, customary law and common law. Its seat of government is in Gaborone.

=== Legislative branch ===
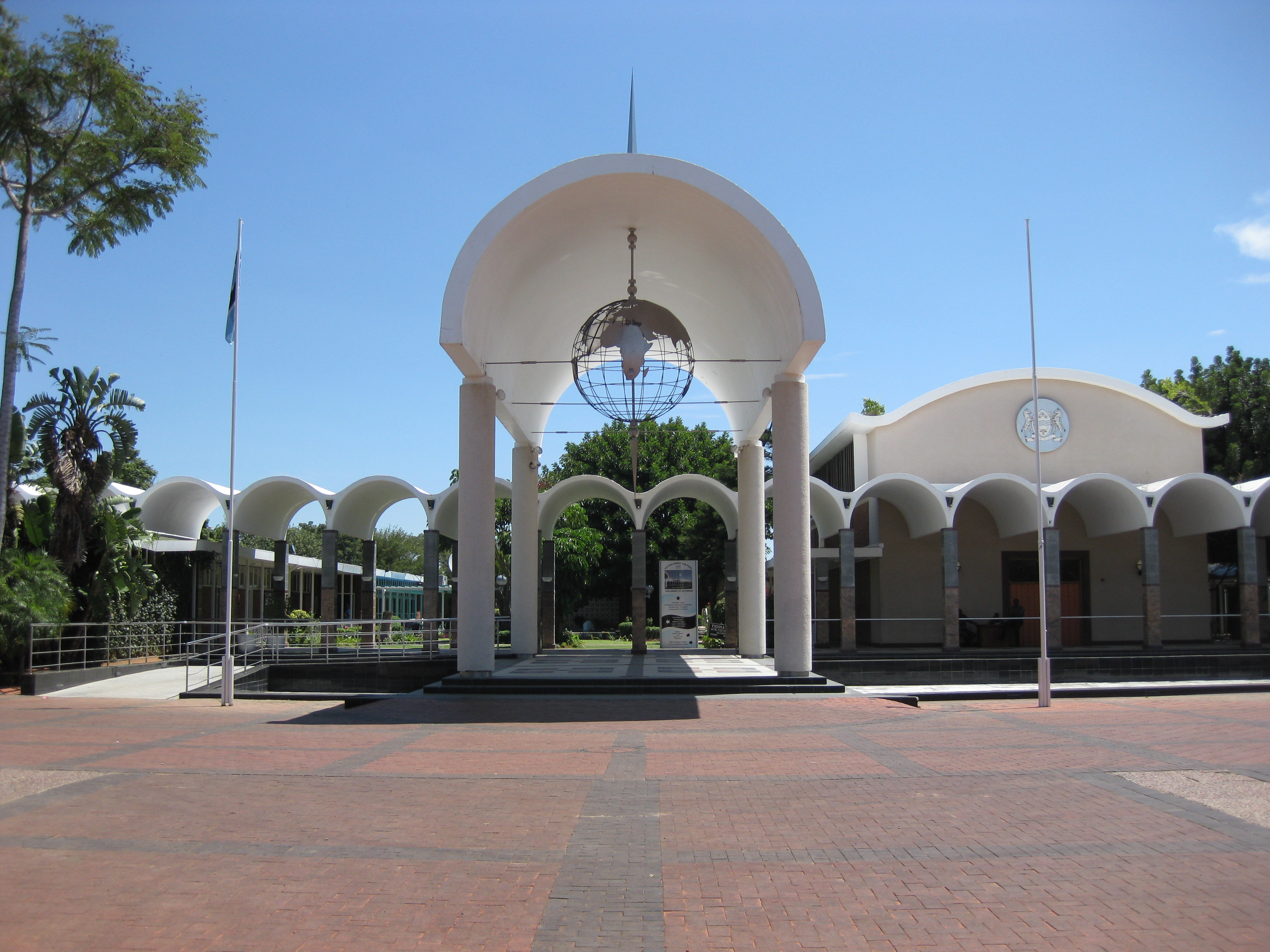
National Assembly of Botswana

The legislature of Botswana is derived from the Westminster system of the United Kingdom, though it has several aspects that distinguish it from this system. Its official function under the constitution is to "make laws for the peace, order and good government of Botswana". The legislature is intended to act as a check on the executive, but it has little direct power to limit the executive's power, given the fusion of powers and the fact that single-party majority governments have always been the case.

The legislative body of Botswana is the National Assembly, a unicameral body consisting of 69 members. 61 of these members are directly elected by their constituents and six of these members are chosen by the National Assembly. The President of Botswana and the Speaker of the National Assembly are ex-officio members. For a bill to become a law, it must be approved by the National Assembly. The assembly uses a question time procedure to obtain information.

The Ntlo ya Dikgosi is an advisory body established by the constitution. Its members include eight chiefs of the Tswana people, five members appointed by the president and 22 members chosen by the eight chiefs. Any bill that affects the constitution or traditional tribal laws must be referred to the Ntlo ya Dikgosi, where it reads the bill and passes a resolution stating its position on the bill. It has no legislative powers of its own.

=== Executive branch ===
The executive branch of Botswana is headed by the President of Botswana, who serves as both the head of state and head of government. The president holds office by virtue of their ability to command the confidence of the National Assembly. In the case of a single party winning a majority of seats, the leader of that party automatically becomes the new president. However, in the case of a hung parliament, the president is elected by members of the National Assembly, a scenario which has not happened before. The executive is the strongest branch of government in Botswana and the president wields significant power, effectively heading the legislative branch of government as well. The judiciary has been noted as the only de-facto check on the president's power. The president has a suspensive veto, meaning they can initially refuse to sign a bill into law but cannot block it permanently. If the president withholds assent, the bill is returned to the National Assembly. Should the Assembly reaffirm its support with a simple majority vote within six months and resubmit the bill, the president is required to assent within 21 days. Failure to do so will automatically trigger a snap election, unless the president chooses to resign before that deadline. Once signed, the bill becomes law and is published in the Government Gazette. This structure allows the President to delay legislation but ultimately grants the National Assembly the supreme power to override the veto. The president is also the commander-in-chief of the nation's military. The vice-president of Botswana and the Cabinet of Botswana are appointed and constituted by the president. The executive is wholly drawn from the National Assembly, thus ministers must always be Members of Parliament. Ministers within Cabinet make major decisions collectively and are therefore collectively responsible for the consequences of these decisions. F

=== Judicial branch ===
The highest court of Botswana is the Court of Appeal, which is constituted under section 99 of the Constitution and consists of a president and such number of justices of appeal as may be prescribed by the National Assembly. There are eight judges of the Court of Appeal, who are all expatriates drawn from different parts of the Commonwealth. To date, no Motswana has ever been appointed to the Court of Appeal.

The High Court is a superior court of record with unlimited original jurisdiction to hear and determine any criminal and civil cases under any law. The High Court is constituted under section 95 of the Constitution and consists of a Chief Justice and such number of other judges of the High Court as may be prescribed by the National Assembly. There are sixteen permanent judges of the High Court. Until 1992, the judges of the High Court were expatriate judges who were appointed on short-term contracts of two to three years. In 1992 the first citizen judges were appointed to the bench. There are three High Court divisions in Lobatse, Gaborone and Francistown.

Most cases are settled by customary courts, which are presided over by tribal chiefs. These courts are often preferred by the community due to their relative simplicity. There are also Magistrates' Courts in Botswana. These courts are subordinate to the High Court and hear a range of civil, criminal and family law matters. There are nineteen Magistrates' Courts in the country, with fifty magistrates of whom seventeen are expatriate.

== Local and tribal government ==
Botswana's government is centralised and the powers of local government are determined by national law. Local government is authorised under the Local Government (District Councils) Act, 1965. The smallest division of government in Botswana is the local council. Cities in Botswana are under the jurisdiction of a mayor and a city council, which is led by a council chairperson. Smaller towns also have town councils, while rural areas are collected under district councils. These councils are primarily responsible for education, health, roads, water, local development and general welfare. Local governmental bodies do not collect significant funds and nearly all local spending is funded by the national government.

Tribes are led by tribal chiefs, who often have significant influence over the affairs of local government. Chiefs are responsible for chairing kgotlas, traditional tribal meetings of the community and for presiding over customary courts. Kgotlas predate Botswana's independence and represent the traditional mode of government in which a chief ruled as the first among equals. Tswana chiefs were historically more accountable to the people than in other African societies, as the region's main industry, cattle farming, allowed farmers more mobility and independence than would be provided by growing crops. Tribal land is held and allocated by Land Boards. These Land Boards are made up of members chosen by the tribal community and members appointed by the Minister of Lands.

Botswana is divided into 28 districts. Each district is under the jurisdiction of a district administration, led by a district commissioner.

== Political parties ==
Botswana is characterised by a competitive multi-party system. The country had a dominant-party system in which the BDP won every election from 1965 until 2024. The party was formed by Seretse Khama in 1962 during the nation's movement toward independence and it ruled with a majority in every government until 2024.

Historically, the Botswana National Front had been the main opposition party, advocating for left-wing politics. The opposition in the Botswana legislature was often fragmented, with several parties competing with one another in addition to challenging the BDP. The opposition had mainly been supported by urbanites, tribes outside of the majority Tswana population and certain tribal chiefs such as Bathoen II. Increasing urbanisation beginning in the 80s gave more strength to opposition parties.

Factionalism is common in Botswana political parties and several parties have split from the Botswana National Front, including the Botswana Congress Party that became another significant opposition party after its creation in 1998. Several attempts were made to create alliances between opposition parties. Most notably in 2012, the Botswana National Front, the Botswana Movement for Democracy and the Botswana People's Party formed the Umbrella for Democratic Change which ultimately defeated the BDP at the 2024 Botswana general election.

== Elections ==
Botswana has held regular elections since its independence at five year intervals, all of which have been won by the Botswana Democratic Party. Elections are overseen by the Independent Electoral Commission (IEC). Elections in Botswana use first-past-the-post voting in which the winner is the candidate that receives a majority or plurality of votes. Botswana is rare among African countries in that its elections have never been associated with widespread political violence.

The independence of Botswana's elections have been the subject of scrutiny over the years. While elections are free and opposition parties are unrestrained, the incumbent party has access to other advantages. Prior to the creation of the IEC, the ruling party controlled elections through the Office of the Supervisor of Elections, which fell under the direct control of the Office of President. The creation of the IEC, as part of democratic reforms undertook in the 1990s, has since mitigated this to an extent, though questions around its independence lingered on during the remainder of one-party dominance.

== Policy issues ==
=== Economic policy ===
Botswana is an upper middle income country with a mixed economy and it has one of the strongest economies in Africa. The foundation of Botswana's economic policy was set by the first post-independence government in the 1960s, incorporating a self-sustaining budget system through a series of national development plans. There is significant income inequality in Botswana, particularly between the relatively developed urban areas and the poorer rural areas. The unemployment rate in Botswana was 20% as of 2015. Botswana's dependence on the diamond industry has led to diversification of the economy becoming one of the nation's major economic policy goals throughout its history. Government programs such as the National Development Bank, the Botswana Development Corporation, the Financial Assistance Policy and the Economic Diversification Drive have been implemented to spur economic growth in other industries, but they have not significantly decreased the nation's dependence on its diamond industry.

The economy of colonial Bechuanaland focused on cattle farming and this was the primary industry for the first decade of Botswana's independence. As most of the nation was involved with this field in some form, there was little cause for class conflict in the predominantly rural population. While land distribution was sometimes an issue, there was enough unclaimed land that cattle farmers could operate as nomads, further reducing disagreement over economic issues. In 1967, diamond deposits were found in Botswana. This incentivised the government to pursue a commodity economy from mining, supplemented with smaller industries such as beef farming, manufacturing and tourism. The country's economic success is attributed to neoliberal policies of free markets and private property protections, significantly increasing the population's post-independence living standards. Botswana was one of the only sub-Saharan governments that did not engage in significant regulatory or redistributive policy following decolonisation. This, as well as its fiscally responsible management of the diamond industry, led to some of the world's largest economic growth over the following decades. More recent development has emphasised welfare statehood through redistributive economic policy.

=== Foreign policy ===
The president is responsible for the foreign policy of Botswana, overseeing the Minister of Foreign Affairs. Botswana's political and economic success relative to other countries in Africa has led it to play a larger role in regional and global affairs. By the end of the 20th century, Botswana had begun sending financial and military support to neighbouring countries and international organisations. Botswana has emphasised multilateralism in its foreign policy. Its landlocked territory and export-driven economy have incentivised it to maintain strong diplomatic ties with other countries, and its low population and proximity to unstable governments have caused Botswana to work closely with international organisations for security and resources.

From 1966 to 1994, the countries bordering Botswana were unstable or otherwise hostile to Botswana. It did not establish formal relations with its largest neighbour, South Africa, during the latter's discriminatory apartheid rule. In its first years, Botswana had no military. The Botswana Defence Force was eventually created in response to regional instability. As South Africa liberalised after 1994, Botswana's primary foreign policy concern became the instability in neighbouring Zimbabwe.

For much of its history as an independent country, Botswana practiced a realpolitik foreign policy. During the presidency of Ian Khama, it shifted to an idealist foreign policy, in which it routinely criticised governments for human rights violations. During this period, it was often the only member of the African Union to support the International Criminal Court or to condemn human rights violations in autocratic nations.

=== Social policy ===
Botswana's relative wealth compared to other countries in the region has allowed for high spending on public services such as education, health and infrastructure. As of 2014, the Ministry of Education and Skills Development had the largest budget of any government initiative. Approximately 10,000 kilometres of road were paved in the first fifty years of the country's independence, compared to the 50 kilometres that existed before independence.

Welfare programs in Botswana are relatively limited and subject to means testing and there is no national level social security. The country's predominantly arid environment results in droughts becoming a frequent public welfare concern. HIV/AIDS is the most serious healthcare issue in the country and the HIV/AIDS epidemic in Botswana is one of the most severe outbreaks in the world. Botswana received less foreign aid when combating the epidemic in the 1990s, allowing it to spread.

== Human rights ==
Freedom House considers Botswana to be free with a score of 72/100 in its 2022 Freedom in the World report. It scored high in political rights, though Freedom House expressed concerns regarding the representation of women and minorities and the lack of freedom of information laws. It also scored high in civil rights, though Freedom House expressed concerns regarding freedom of the press and the right to strike. Transparency International has regularly recognised Botswana as the least corrupt country in Africa, and it is often described as comparable to the liberal democracies of Western Europe. One potential issues for human rights in Botswana is the lack of strong checks and balances in the government, which allows the president to exercise wide latitude over policy and arbitrarily curtail free speech. Early focus on public works projects after Botswana's independence rather than militarisation is credited for early legitimacy of the government, permitting stability in the nation's politics.

Conceptions of human rights in Botswana are shaped by collectivist traditions such as botho philosophy rather than individualist traditions. Confrontational approaches to human rights such as protest, strike action and public condemnation are often seen as uncivil foreign inventions. Activism in Botswana instead focuses mainly on providing goods and services to those in need. Human rights Non-governmental organisations are relatively uncommon in Botswana. Among the most active is the Botswana Network on Ethics, Law and HIV/AIDS, which emphasises response to HIV but also addresses other areas such as the rights of women, children and LGBT people.

== Bibliography ==
- Hillbom, Ellen; Bolt, Jutta (2018). Botswana – A Modern Economic History. Palgrave Macmillan. ISBN 978-3-319-73144-5.
- Leith, J. Clark (2005). Why Botswana Prospered. McGill-Queen's University Press. ISBN 0-7735-2820-2.
