= Olebile Gaborone =

Motswana politician

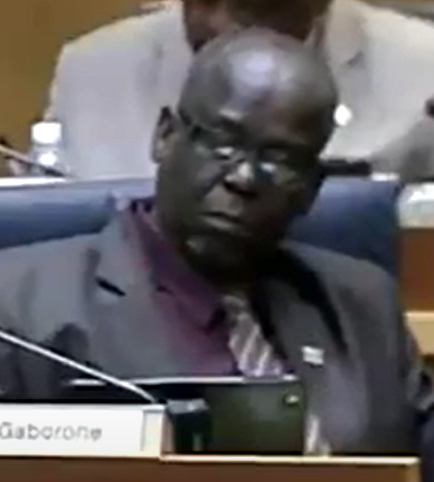
- Gaborone in 2013
- Born: Olebile Marakadu Gaborone; 1947 (age 78–79)
- Education: University of Botswana, Lesotho and Swaziland; University of Manchester
- Occupation: Politician

Olebile Marakadu Gaborone (born 1947) is a Motswana politician who served as the High Commissioner of Botswana to Mozambique from 2016-2018, and formerly served in the Parliament of Botswana representing Tlokweng as a part of the Botswana National Front (2004-2009) and the Botswana Democratic Party (2010-2014). Gaborone additionally served as the Assistant Minister of Local Government and Rural Development from February 2013 to October 2014. Gaborone graduated with a Bachelor of Arts degree in Humanities from the University of Botswana, Lesotho and Swaziland, and a Master's degree in Education from the University of Manchester.

Prior to his political career, Gaborone worked as the Chief Executive Officer for Botswana Telecommunications Corporation, as a managing director for Longman Botswana, and as a lecturer and account registrar for the University of Botswana.
