= Goodhope-Mabule =

Parliamentary constituency in Botswana, 2014–2024

- Former Single-member constituency for the National Assembly
- Boundary of Goodhope-Mabule constituency in Botswana
- District: Southern District
- Population: 36,428
- Area: 2,735 km^{2}

Former constituency
- Created: 2014
- Abolished: 2024
- Created from: Barolong
- Replaced by: Goodhope-Mmathethe

Goodhope-Mabule was a constituency in Botswana represented in the National Assembly. After the completion of the 2022 Delimitation of Parliamentary constituencies, the seat was subject to significant boundary changes and merged with Mmathethe-Molapowabojang to create Goodhope-Mmathethe, which was first contested at the 2024 general election.

== Constituency profile ==
The seat and its predecessors (Barolong and Lobatse/Barolong) have traditionally been strongholds for the Botswana Democratic Party (BDP), consistently supporting it from their establishment in 1965 until the 2014 election. The constituency was renamed from Barolong to Goodhope-Mabule after the 2012 delimitation process ahead of the 2014 elections, where it saw modest boundary changes. The Umbrella for Democratic Change (UDC) notionally gained the seat from the BDP with a plurality in the 2014 election. However, in the 2019 election, the BDP reclaimed the seat, in alignment with the strong swings to the BDP in the southern parts of the country in that election. It is the southeasternmost constituency in the country, bordering South Africa. The predominantly rural constituency encompasses the following localities:

1. Sekhutlhane
2. Mabule
3. Tshidilamolomo
4. Mmakgori
5. Dikhukhung
6. Leporung
7. Phitshane Molopo
8. Sedibeng
9. Mokatako
10. Hebron
11. Ditlharapa
12. Metlojane
13. Goodhope
14. Bethel
15. Dinatshana
16. Pitsane
17. Tlhareseleele
18. Tswaanyaneng
19. Tswagare
20. Mokgomane
21. Rakhuna
22. Ramatlabama
23. Papatlo
24. Phihetshwane
25. Marojane
26. Logagane
27. Borobadilepe
28. Madingwana
29. Sheep Farm
30. Ngwatsau
31. Mogwalale
32. Kgoro
33. Molete
34. Pitsanepotokwe

== Members of Parliament ==
Key: UDC BDP

Election	Winner
2014 election	James Mathokgwane
2015 by-election	Lotlamoreng II
2019 election	Eric Molale

== Election results ==
=== 2019 election ===
General election 2019: Goodhope-Mabule
Party	Candidate	Votes	%	±%
BDP	Eric Molale	9,844	60.11	+15.02
UDC	Patrick Molutsi	5,935	36.24	–13.37
AP	Tumisang Letlakana	508	3.10	New
Independent	Tirelo Modisaotsile	90	0.55	New
Margin of victory		3,909	23.87	N/A
Total valid votes		16,377	99.19	+0.65
Rejected ballots		133	0.81	−0.65
Turnout		16,510	87.00	+1.14
Registered electors		18,364		
BDP gain from UDC		Swing	+14.20	

=== 2015 by-election ===
By-election 2015: Goodhope-Mabule
Party	Candidate	Votes	%	±%
UDC	Lotlamoreng II	6,152	56.39	+6.78
BDP	Eric Molale	4,372	40.08	–5.01
BCP	Comfort Maruping	385	3.53	–1.77
Margin of victory		1,780	16.31	+11.79
Total valid votes		10,909	98.81	+0.27
Rejected ballots		131	1.19	−0.27
Turnout		11,040	~69.04	~−16.82
UDC hold		Swing	+5.90	

=== 2014 election ===
General election 2014: Goodhope-Mabule
Party	Candidate	Votes	%
UDC	James Mathokgwane	6,712	49.61
BDP	Kitso Mokaila	7,013	45.09
BCP	Lesego Gatogang	475	5.30
Margin of victory		611	4.52
Total valid votes		13,530	98.54
Rejected ballots		200	1.46
Turnout		13,730	85.86
Registered electors		15,991	
UDC notional gain from BDP			
