= Mmopane-Metsimotlhabe =

Parliamentary constituency in Botswana, 2024 onwards

- Single-member constituency for the National Assembly
- Boundary of Mmopane-Metsimotlhabe in Botswana
- District: Kweneng
- Population: 39,349
- Major settlements: Mmopane; Metsimotlhabe
- Area: 124 km^{2}

Current constituency
- Created: 2024
- Party: UDC
- Created from: Lentsweletau-Mmopane; Gabane-Mmankgodi
- MP: Helen Manyeneng
- Margin of victory: 120 (1.2 pp)

Mmopane-Metsimotlhabe is a constituency in the Kweneng District which is represented in the National Assembly of Botswana. The seat was created after the 2022 Delimitation of Parliamentary constituencies and was first contested at the 2024 general election. It has since been represented by Helen Manyeneng of the UDC.

== Geography ==
The semi-urban constituency consists of:

1. Mmopane
2. Metsimotlhabe

== Members of Parliament ==
Key: UDC

Election	Winner
2024 election	Helen Manyeneng

== Election results ==
=== 2024 election ===
General election 2024: Mmopane-Metsimotlhabe
Party	Candidate	Votes	%
UDC	Helen Manyeneng	3,431	33.20
BDP	James Lekgetho	3,311	32.04
BPF	Gilbert Watshipi	1,812	17.53
BCP	Mokgweetsi Kgosipula	1,676	16.22
Independent	Tiro Matshaba	81	0.78
RAP	Nkwalili Nkosana	23	0.22
Margin of victory		120	1.16
Total valid votes		10,334	99.44
Rejected ballots		58	0.56
Turnout		10,392	80.07
Registered electors		12,978	
UDC notional gain from BDP			
