= Parliament of Botswana =

Legislative body in Botswana

Parliament of Botswana Palamente ya Botswana
- 13th Parliament

Type
- Type: Unicameral
- Houses: National Assembly

History
- Founded: 1966

Leadership
- Speaker: Dithapelo Keorapetse since 7 November 2024
- Deputy Speaker: Helen Manyeneng, UDC since 7 November 2024
- President of Botswana: Duma Boko since 1 November 2024
- Leader of the House: Moeti Mohwasa, UDC since 19 November 2024
- Government Whip: Sam Digwa, UDC since 19 November 2024
- Leader of the Opposition: Dumelang Saleshando, BCP since 11 November 2024
- Opposition whip: Caterpillar Hikuama, BCP since 11 November 2024

Structure
- Seats: 69
- National Assembly political groups: Government (49): Umbrella for Democratic Change (36) (Note: Botswana National Front (23); Alliance for Progressives (6); Botswana People's Party (3); Independents (4)); Botswana Patriotic Front (5); Specially-elected (6); Independent (1); President (ex-officio) (1); Official opposition (15): Botswana Congress Party (15); Minority opposition (4): Botswana Democratic Party (4); Presiding officer (1): Speaker (ex-officio) (1)

Elections
- National Assembly voting system: First-past-the-post voting
- First National Assembly election: 18 October 1969
- Last National Assembly election: 30 October 2024
- Next National Assembly election: By October 2029

Meeting place
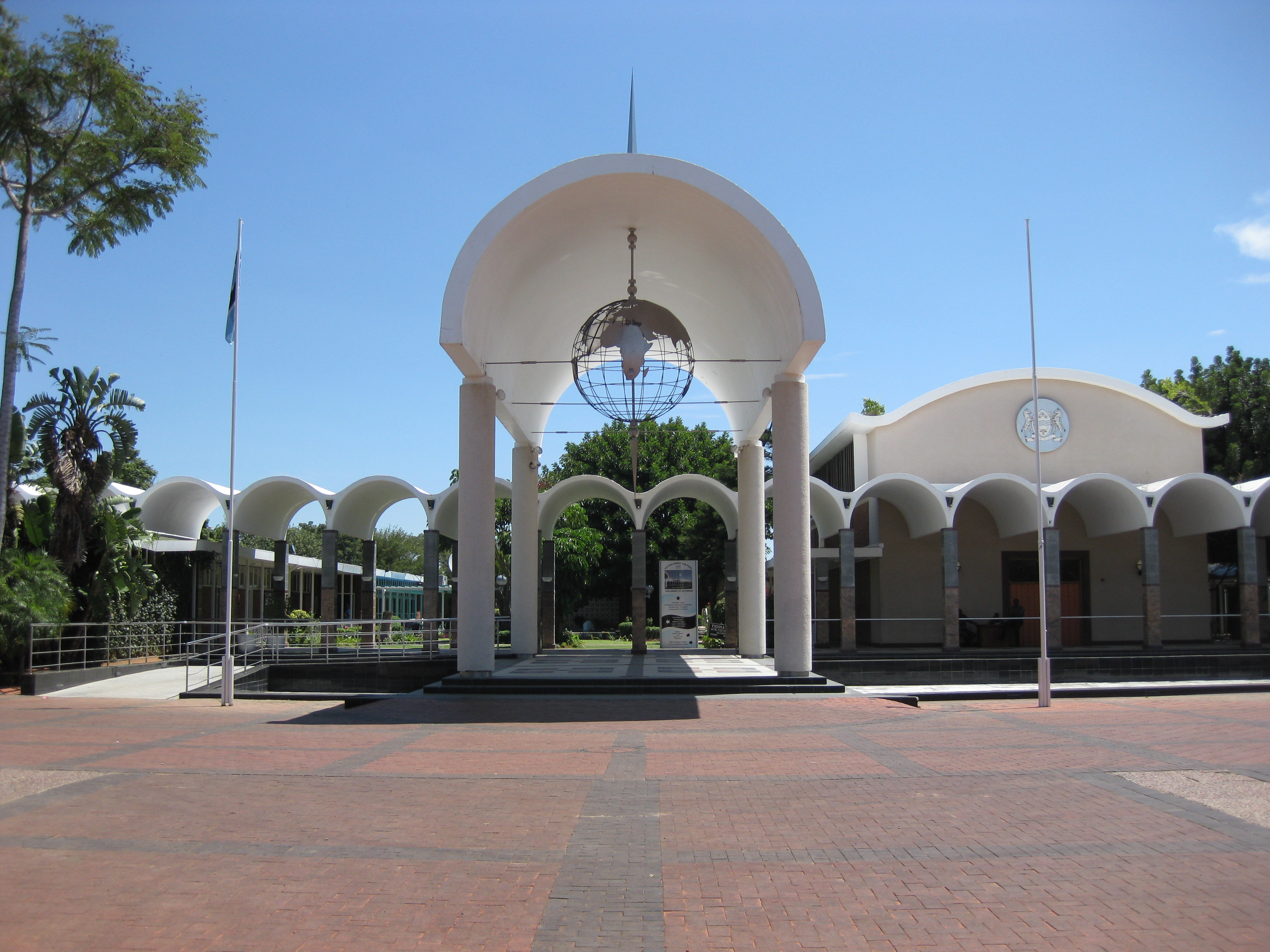
- National Assembly Chamber; Gaborone; South-East District

Website
- www.parliament.gov.bw

The Parliament of Botswana (Tswana: Palamente ya Botswana) consists of the President and the National Assembly. In contrast to other parliamentary systems, the Parliament elects the President directly (instead of having both a ceremonial President and a Prime Minister who has real authority as head of government) for a set five-year term of office. A president can only serve 2 full terms. The President is both head of state and of government in Botswana's parliamentary republican system. The Parliament of Botswana is the supreme legislative authority. In October 2024, the 2024 general election was held which saw the ousting of the Botswana Democratic Party from power after 59 years of government, propelling the opposition centre-left Umbrella for Democratic Change to a majority of 36 seats in the 69 seat National Assembly.

There also exists a body known as Ntlo ya Dikgosi, (The House of Chiefs), which is an advisory body that does not form part of the Parliament.

Botswana is one of only two African nations (together with Mauritius) to have achieved a clean record of free and fair elections since independence, having held 11 elections since 1966 without any serious incidents of corruption.

== See also ==
- Politics of Botswana
- National Assembly of Botswana
- List of parliamentary constituencies of Botswana
- List of legislatures by country
