= Mmopane =

- Village
- Location in Botswana
- Coordinates: 24°34′1″S 25°52′24″E
- Country: Botswana
- District: Kweneng District

Population (2011)
  - Village: 14,655
  - Metro: Gaborone

Mmopane is a village in the Kweneng District of Botswana. The village is located around 15 km from Gaborone, the capital of Botswana. The population was 3,512 in 2001 census and 14,655 at the 2011 census. It's now part of Gaborone agglomeration home to 421,907 inhabitants at the 2011 census.

== Government ==
Mmopane is part of the Mmopane-Metsimotlhabe constituency for elections to the National Assembly of Botswana.
