= Thulagano Segokgo =

Botswanan politician

Thulagano Merafe Segokgo

Minister of Communications, Knowledge and Technology of Botswana
- In office 13 February 2022 – 1 November 2024
- President: Mokgweetsi Masisi

Personal details
- Born: Botswana
- Party: Botswana Democratic Party

Thulagano Merafe Segokgo is a Motswana politician and educator. He is the current Minister of Communications, Knowledge and Technology in Botswana, having been appointed to the position in 2019 by the current president of Botswana, Mokgweetsi Masisi. His term began on 13 February 2022.

Awards and achievements
Preceded by	Minister of Communications, Knowledge and Technology of Botswana	Succeeded by
