= Mmathethe-Molapowabojang =

Parliamentary constituency in the Southern District of Botswana 2014–2024

- Former Single-member constituency for the National Assembly
- Boundary of Mmathethe-Molapowabojang in Botswana
- District: Southern
- Population: 43,855
- Area: 8,328 km^{2}

Former constituency
- Created: 2014
- Abolished: 2024
- Created from: Ngwaketse South
- Replaced by: Goodhope-Mmathethe

Mmathethe-Molapowabojang was a constituency in the Southern District represented in the National Assembly of Botswana. Further to the completion of the 2022 Delimitation of Parliamentary constituencies, the seat was subjected to significant boundary changes that led to its dissolution. It merged with Goodhope-Mabule to form Goodhope-Mmathethe, first contested at the 2024 general election.

== Constituency profile ==
The seat was subject to moderate boundary changes and was renamed from Ngwaketse South to Mmathethe-Molapowabojang in the lead up to the 2014 general election. It was abolished in 2024 and only elected BDP MPs in its brief existence. The constituency, predominantly rural, encompassed the following villages:

1. Lorolwane
2. Digawana
3. Musi
4. Tswaaneng
5. Metlobo
6. Kangwe
7. Gathwane
8. Gamajaalela
9. Motsentshe
10. Magoriapitse
11. Lejwana
12. Mmathethe
13. Mogojogojo
14. Molapowabojang
15. Lorwana
16. Maokane
17. Gasita
18. Segwagwa
19. Diabo
20. Dipotsana

== Members of Parliament ==
Key: BDP

Election	Winner
2014 election	Alfred Madigele
2019 election	Edwin Dikoloti

== Election results ==
=== 2019 election ===
General election 2019: Mmathethe-Molapowabojang
Party	Candidate	Votes	%	±%
BDP	Edwin Dikoloti	12,069	67.33	+15.89
UDC	Moiseraele Dibeela	5,350	29.85	−12.95
BPF	Abram Kesupile	505	2.82	N/A
Margin of victory		6,719	37.48	+28.84
Total valid votes		17,924	97.77	−0.46
Rejected ballots		409	2.23	+0.46
Turnout		18,333	84.65	−1.17
Registered electors		21,657		
BDP hold		Swing	+14.42	

=== 2014 election ===
General election 2014: Mmathethe-Molapowabojang
Party	Candidate	Votes	%
BDP	Alfred Madigele	8,283	51.44
UDC	Moiseraele Dibeela	6,891	42.80
BCP	Tiny Kojane	928	5.76
Margin of victory		1,392	8.64
Total valid votes		16,102	98.23
Rejected ballots		290	1.77
Turnout		16,392	85.82
Registered electors		19,100	
BDP notional hold			
