= Tlhareseleele =

Village in Botswana

Coordinates: 25°30′28″S 25°37′53″E

Tlhareseleele is a small village in the Southern District of Botswana.

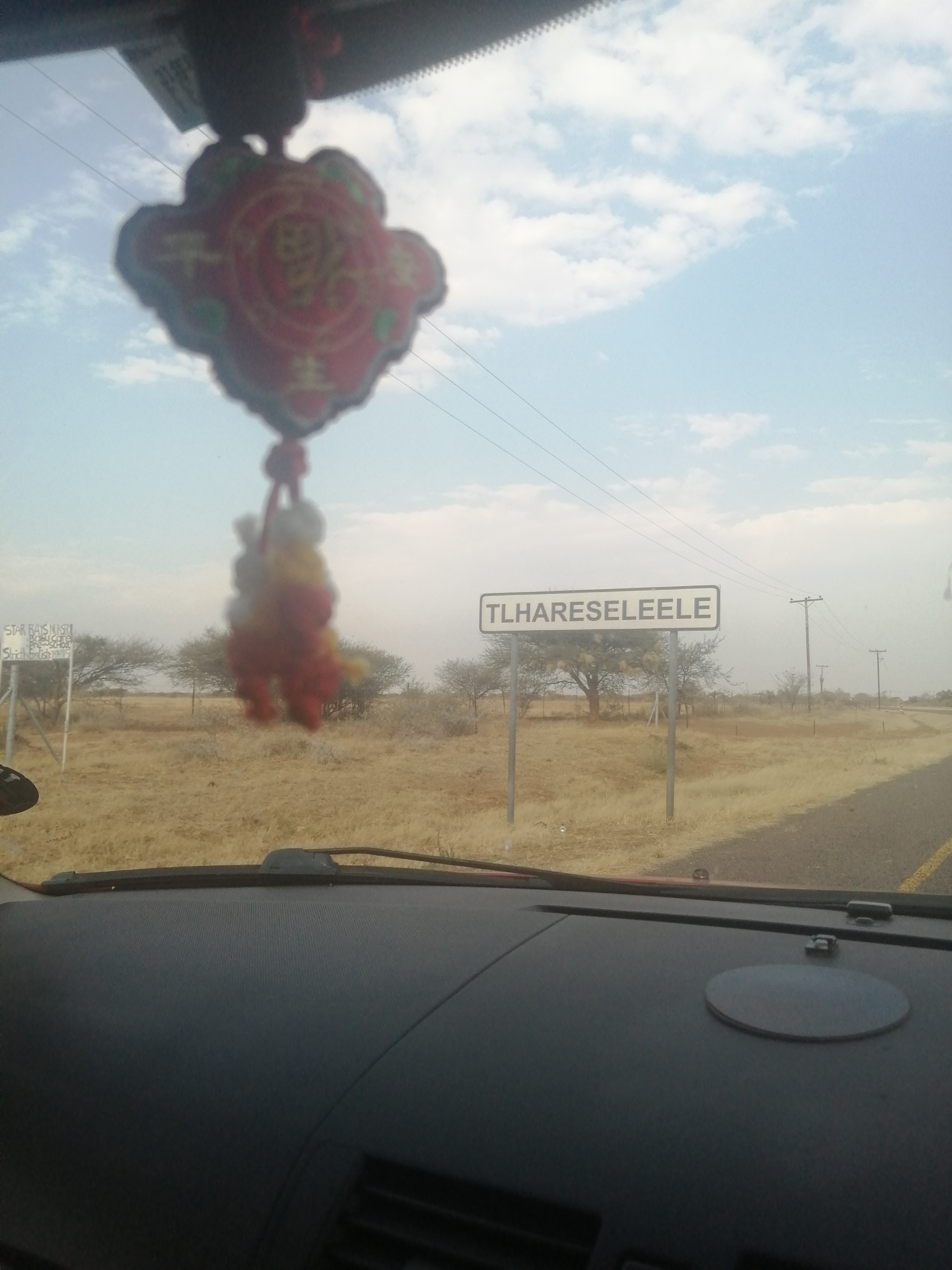
A signboard of Tlhareseleele Village

== Population ==
According to the 2011 population census Tlhareseleele has a total population of 711 residents with a total of 341 males and 370 females.

== See also ==
- Southern District (Botswana)
