= Stephen Modise =

Botswana medical doctor and politician

Stephen Modise is a Motswana politician, medical professional and educator who has served as the Minister of Health of Botswana since November 2024. Modise also serves as Secretary General of the Botswana National Front.

== Education and career ==
Modise holds degrees in the field of medicine and health education:

- Bachelor of Biomedical Science
- Doctor of Medicine (MD)
- Postgraduate Certificate in Medical Education
- Master's Degree in Health Professions Education

=== Political career ===
Modise plays a significant role in Botswana's political landscape. As a Specially Elected Member of Parliament, he has contributed to national decision-making and policy formulation. He is affiliated with the Umbrella for Democratic Change (UDC).

== See also ==
- Bogolo Kenewendo
- Peggy Serame
- Dithapelo Keorapetse
