= Helen Manyeneng =

Motswana politician

Deputy Speaker of the National Assembly of Botswana
- Incumbent
- Assumed office 7 November 2024
- Preceded by: Pono Moatlhodi

Member of Parliament for Mmopane-Metsimotlhabe
- Incumbent
- Assumed office 30 October 2024
- Preceded by: constituency established
- Majority: 120 (1.16%)

Personal details
- Party: Alliance for Progressives
- Other political affiliations: Umbrella for Democratic Change

Helen Pushie Manyeneng is a Motswana politician who has been Member of Parliament for Mmopane-Metsimotlhabe since 2024.

== Early career ==
Manyeneng is a nurse by profession.

== Political career ==
In the 2024 Botswana general election she was one of three female members of the National Assembly of Botswana. She was elected in the newly created constituency of Mmopane-Metsimotlhabe. She was elected deputy speaker. She is an advocate for equitable representation of women in politics.

== See also ==
- 13th Parliament of Botswana
