= Lawrence Ookeditse =

Motswana politician

Assistant Minister of Health
- Incumbent
- Assumed office 11 November 2024
- President: Duma Boko

Member of Parliament for Nata-Gweta
- Incumbent
- Assumed office 30 October 2024
- Preceded by: Polson Majaga
- Majority: 3,916 (33.2%)

Personal details
- Party: Botswana Patriotic Front (since 2021)
- Other political affiliations: Botswana Democratic Party (until 2021)
- Education: University of Botswana (BA, MA)

Lawrence Ookeditse is a Motswana politician and political scientist who has served as the member of the National Assembly for Nata-Gweta since 2024. A member of the Botswana Patriotic Front (BPF), he has been Assistant Minister of Health in the government of President Duma Boko since November 2024.

Ookeditse was a member of the Botswana Democratic Party (BDP) and held several positions in the BPF, including publicity secretary and secretary-general. He was declared the winner of a disputed election for BPF president in November 2025. Following litigation over the party leadership in 2026, the rival factions agreed to establish an interim executive committee pending another elective congress.

== Early life and education ==
Ookeditse grew up in Mosetse, a village in north-eastern Botswana. He attended Mosetse Primary School, Dukwi Junior Secondary School and Shashe Senior Secondary School. He subsequently studied political science at the University of Botswana, where he obtained a bachelor's degree. He also holds a master's degree in politics and international relations.

Before entering Parliament, Ookeditse worked as a researcher and lecturer in political science and international relations at the University of Botswana. He was also a research coordinator for Population Services International Botswana and served as director of youth and a policy specialist in the Ministry of Youth Empowerment, Sport and Culture Development. He contributed political commentary to newspapers and presented a discussion programme on Gabz FM. He is currently pursuing a PhD in international relations at Stellenbosch University; specialising on cross-border financial flows and national security.

== Political career ==
=== Early political career ===
Ookeditse was involved in the BDP's communications and campaigning activities. During the 2014 general election, he worked as a party campaign consultant, and he subsequently served as deputy chairperson of the BDP's communications and international relations subcommittee. He was seen as a possible candidate for the party in Nata-Gweta.

He left the BDP and joined the BPF in January 2021 attributing his departure in part to disagreements with then-president Mokgweetsi Masisi. He joined the BPF national executive committee in February 2021 and later became its publicity secretary. At the party's September 2023 congress, he was elected secretary-general as Mephato Reatile became president.

In July 2023, officers of Botswana's Directorate of Intelligence and Security detained Ookeditse during arrests involving BPF officials and journalists. According to Amnesty International, he was held for more than 48 hours without charge. In 2024, the BPF leadership decided to withdraw from the Umbrella for Democratic Change (UDC), a decision challenged by some party members in court. As secretary-general, Ookeditse defended the use of the courts to resolve internal party disputes.

=== In government ===
In the general election of 30 October 2024, Ookeditse flipped Nata-Gweta for the BPF, defeating the incumbent BDP member Polson Majaga by a majority of over 3,900.

On 11 November 2024, President Boko announced Ookeditse's appointment as Assistant Minister of Health, serving under Health Minister Stephen Modise. Alongside Baratiwa Mathoothe, he is one of two BPF MPs in government.

As assistant minister, Ookeditse has been involved in proposals for a national health insurance scheme. In March 2026, he told Parliament that the proposed legislation was intended to broaden access to healthcare, including services at private facilities, rather than privatise public clinics. He has also addressed the digitisation of health records and the supply of medicines. In October 2026, he participated in discussions with the United Nations Economic Commission for Africa on health financing and universal health coverage.

Ookeditse has a culturally liberal outlook; he has advocated liberalising Botswana's abortion laws to improve access to safe abortion services, decriminalising the possession of small quantities of cannabis, and advancing LGBT rights in Botswana.

=== BPF leadership dispute ===
In October 2025, Ookeditse announced that he would challenge Reatile for the BPF presidency. At the party's disputed elective congress in Serowe on 1 November, Ookeditse was declared the winner. On 17 November, Reatile said he would step aside following negotiations between the factions. However, another group rejected the settlement and backed retired army commander Gaolatlhe Galebotswe as interim party president.

In March 2026, the High Court dismissed an urgent application by Ookeditse's faction to establish its authority over the party. The court identified irregularities in the November congress and upheld Reatile's authority to dissolve it. The ruling left the competing claims to the party leadership unresolved. In September, the rival groups reached a reconciliation agreement and formed a joint interim national executive committee to oversee preparations for another elective congress, scheduled for 4–5 December 2026. Ookeditse was not named to the interim committee.

== Selected publications ==
- Ookeditse, Lawrence (2 July 2020). "Reimagining Botswana's national security in light of COVID-19". African Security Review. 29 (3): 267–279. doi:10.1080/10246029.2020.1806088. ISSN 1024-6029.
- Ookeditse, Lawrence (2 January 2021). "The 'burden of expectation' and political instability: A case for direct election of the President of Botswana". African Security Review. 30 (1): 121–136. doi:10.1080/10246029.2020.1856695. ISSN 1024-6029.
- Ookeditse, Lawrence; Makhumalo, Onneetse Kym (3 July 2022). "Election campaign financing in Botswana: a case for comprehensive regulation for fairness and to avert illicit financial flows". Journal of Contemporary African Studies. 40 (3): 416–430. doi:10.1080/02589001.2022.2151577. ISSN 0258-9001.
