= Gabane-Mmankgodi =

Parliamentary constituency in Botswana

- Single-member constituency for the National Assembly
- District: Kweneng
- Population: 37,438
- Electorate: 16,112
- Major settlements: Gabane; Mmankgodi
- Area: 215 km^{2}

Current constituency
- Created: 2004
- Party: BDP
- Created from: Kweneng South
- MP: Kagiso Mmusi
- Margin of victory: 434 (3.3 pp)

Gabane-Mmankgodi is a constituency in the represented by Kagiso Mmusi, a BDP MP in the National Assembly of Botswana since 2019.

== Constituency profile ==
Gabane-Mmankgodi was created ahead of the 2004 general election. It was first contested as Kweneng South East in the 2004 and 2009 general elections, before being renamed Gabane-Mmankgodi from the 2014 general election onwards.

The constituency lies west of Gaborone and is anchored by the villages of Gabane and Mmankgodi. It forms part of the peri-urban belt around the capital, combining settlements that are closely linked to the Greater Gaborone economy with more rural village localities further west. This mixed character has shaped both its administrative profile and its politics: the area contains commuter settlements, traditional village communities, and localities affected by the outward expansion of Gaborone, Mogoditshane and surrounding settlements.

The constituency has the following localities:

1. Gabane
2. Mmankgodi
3. Mmokolodi
4. Tloaneng

== Members of Parliament ==
Key: BDP UDC

Election	Winner
2004 election	Mmoloki Raletobana
2009 election	Mmoloki Raletobana
2014 election	Pius Mokgware
2019 election	Kagiso Mmusi
2024 election	Kagiso Mmusi

== Election results ==
=== 2024 election ===
General election 2024: Gabane-Mmankgodi
Party	Candidate	Votes	%	±%
BDP	Kagiso Mmusi	4,898	37.05	−26.49
UDC	Pius Mokgware	4,464	33.76	+23.33
BCP	Ofentse Mareme	3,702	28.00	N/A
BPF	Lefoko Molebatsi	157	1.19	N/A
Margin of victory		434	3.28	−34.53
Total valid votes		13,221	99.38	−0.61
Rejected ballots		83	0.62	+0.61
Turnout		13,304	82.57	−0.47
Registered electors		16,112		
BDP hold		Swing	−24.91	

=== 2019 election ===
General election 2019: Gabane-Mmankgodi
Party	Candidate	Votes	%	±%
BDP	Kagiso Mmusi	12,204	63.53	+23.44
AP	Pius Mokgware	4,940	25.72	N/A
UDC	Robert Gomang	2,005	10.44	−31.54
RAP	Nkosana Nkwalli	60	0.31	N/A
Margin of victory		7,264	37.82	N/A
Total valid votes		19,209	99.99	+1.05
Rejected ballots		2	0.01	−1.05
Turnout		19,211	83.04	−0.58
Registered electors		23,134		
BDP gain from UDC		Swing	+27.49	

=== 2014 election ===
General election 2014: Gabane-Mmankgodi
Party	Candidate	Votes	%	±%
UDC	Pius Mokgware	7,155	41.98	+25.66
BDP	Placid Mmusi	6,833	40.09	−10.16
BCP	Nthusang Dibe	3,056	17.93	−15.50
Margin of victory		322	1.89	N/A
Total valid votes		17,044	98.94	+0.13
Rejected ballots		183	1.06	−0.13
Turnout		17,227	83.62	+7.29
Registered electors		20,601		
UDC gain from BDP		Swing	+17.91	

=== 2009 election ===
General election 2009: Kweneng South East
Party	Candidate	Votes	%	±%
BDP	Mmoloki Raletobana	5,415	50.26	−2.46
BCP	Joyce Mothudi	3,602	33.43	+16.50
BNF	Brendan Rankgomo	1,758	16.32	−14.04
Margin of victory		1,813	16.83	−5.53
Total valid votes		10,775	98.81	+0.66
Rejected ballots		130	1.19	−0.66
Turnout		10,905	76.33	+1.48
Registered electors		14,287		
BDP hold		Swing	−9.48	

=== 2004 election ===
General election 2004: Kweneng South East
Party	Candidate	Votes	%
BDP	Mmoloki Raletobana	3,528	52.71
BNF	Brendan Rankgomo	2,032	30.36
BCP	Jerry Moremi	1,133	16.93
Margin of victory		1,496	22.35
Total valid votes		6,693	98.15
Rejected ballots		126	1.85
Turnout		6,819	74.85
Registered electors		9,110	
BDP win (new seat)			
