= Lefoko Maxwell Moagi =

Motswana politician

Minister of Minerals and Energy of Botswana
- Incumbent
- Assumed office 13 February 2022
- President: Mokgweetsi Masisi

Personal details
- Born: Botswana
- Party: Botswana Democratic Party

Lefoko Maxwell Moagi is a Motswana politician and educator. He served as Minister of Minerals and Energy in Botswana until October 2024, having been appointed to the position in 2019 by the current president of Botswana, Mokgweetsi Masisi. His term began on 13 February 2022.

Awards and achievements
Preceded by	Minister of Minerals and Energy of Botswana	Succeeded by
