= Goodhope-Mmathethe =

Parliamentary constituency in the Southern District, 2024 onwards

- Single-member constituency for the National Assembly
- District: Southern
- Population: 59,183
- Major settlements: Goodhope
- Area: 6,204 km^{2}

Current constituency
- Created: 2024
- Party: Independent
- Created from: Goodhope-Mabule; Mmathethe-Molapowabojang
- MP: Edwin Dikoloti
- Margin of victory: 5,151 (18.9 pp)

Goodhope-Mmathethe is a constituency in the Southern District represented in the National Assembly of Botswana by Edwin Dikoloti since 2024.

== Constituency profile ==
The constituency was created in 2024 after the merger of Goodhope-Mabule and Mmathethe-Molapowabojang following the decennial delimitation exercise held in 2022. With a population of just under sixty-thousand as of 2022, the constituency is the most populous in the country. It is the only constituency represented by an independent politician, the second time an independent has represented a constituency in Botswana after Nehemiah Modubule's victory in 2009.

The rural constituency encompasses the following locations:

1. Gathwane
2. Digawana
3. Lejwana
4. Metlojane
5. Borobadilepe
6. Ditlharapa
7. Hebron
8. Mokgomane
9. Dinatsahana
10. Pitsane
11. Mogojogojo
12. Mokatako
13. Phitshane Molopo
14. Mmakgori
15. Madingwana
16. Tshidilamolomo
17. Ramatlabama
18. Phihetswane
19. Tswagare
20. Kgoro
21. Goodhope
22. Papatlo
23. Rakhuna
24. Metlobo
25. Tswaanyaneng
26. Tswaaneng
27. Leporung
28. Mmathethe
29. Magoriapitse
30. Tlhareseseleele
31. Ngwatsau
32. Mabule
33. Lorwana
34. Logagane
35. Sheep Farm
36. Sekhutlane
37. Bethele
38. Dikhukhung
39. Marojane
40. Pitsane Potlokwe

== Members of Parliament ==
Independent

Election	Winner	Party
2024 election	Edwin Dikoloti	Independent politician

== Election results ==
=== 2024 election ===
General election 2024: Goodhope-Mmathethe
Party	Candidate	Votes	%
Independent	Edwin Dikoloti	12,294	45.06
BDP	Peggy Serame	7,143	26.18
UDC	Gaone Seleka	6,513	23.87
BCP	Lesego Gatogang	878	3.22
BPF	Mogomotsi Kaboeamodimo	458	1.68
Margin of victory		5,151	18.88
Total valid votes		27,286	98.08
Rejected ballots		535	1.92
Turnout		27,821	83.46
Registered electors		33,333	
Independent notional gain from BDP			
