= Edwin Dikoloti =

Motswana politician

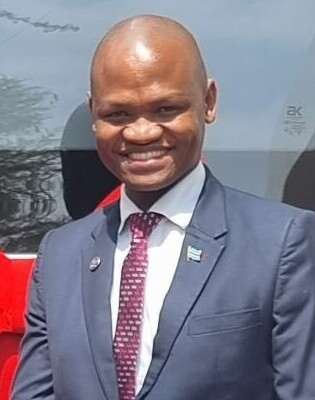

Minister of Lands and Agriculture
- Incumbent
- Assumed office 4 June 2026
- President: Duma Boko
- Preceded by: Micus Chimbombi

Assistant Minister of Lands and Agriculture
- In office 11 November 2024 – 4 June 2026
- Preceded by: Molebatsi Molebatsi
- Succeeded by: Motsamai Motsamai

Member of Parliament for Goodhope-Mmathethe
- Incumbent
- Assumed office 30 October 2024
- Preceded by: Constituency created
- Majority: 5,151 (18.88%)

Member of Parliament for Mmathethe-Molapowabojang
- In office 23 October 2019 – 5 September 2024
- Preceded by: Alfred Madigele
- Succeeded by: Constituency abolished

Minister of Health
- In office 13 February 2022 – 27 September 2024
- President: Mokgweetsi Masisi

Personal details
- Born: Botswana
- Party: Independent
- Other political affiliations: Botswana Democratic Party (until 2024)
- Spouse: Maipelo Mophuting (m. 2025)

Edwin Gorataone Dikoloti is a Motswana politician, veterinarian and educator who has served as the Minister of Lands and Agriculture since 4 June 2026. He previously served as acting Minister of Lands and Agriculture from 2025 to 2026, and as Assistant Minister of Lands and Agriculture from November 2024.

A former member of the Botswana Democratic Party, he was elected to the National Assembly of Botswana as the independent member for Goodhope-Mmathethe at the 2024 Botswana general election. Dikoloti earlier served under President Mokgweetsi Masisi as Minister of Agricultural Development and Food Security from 2019 to 2020 and as Minister of Health and Wellness from 2020 to 2024.

Awards and achievements
Preceded by	Minister of Health of Botswana	Succeeded by
