= President of Botswana =

Head of state and government

President of the Republic of Botswana
- Tautona wa Botswana (Tswana)
- Presidential flag

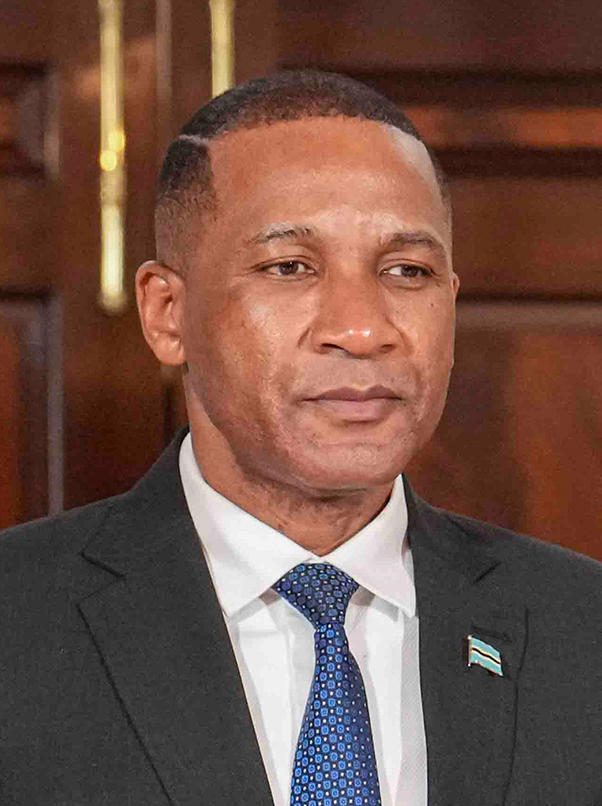
- Incumbent; Duma Boko since 1 November 2024
- Style: Mr President; His Excellency
- Residence: State House
- Seat: Gaborone
- Appointer: Parliament of Botswana
- Term length: Five years, renewable once
- Constituting instrument: Constitution of Botswana (1966)
- Formation: 30 September 1966; 60 years ago
- First holder: Seretse Khama
- Succession: Vice-President of Botswana
- Salary: P 1,075,056

The president of the Republic of Botswana is the head of state and the head of government of Botswana, as well as the commander-in-chief of the Botswana Defence Force, according to the Constitution. The president is elected by the National Assembly, the sole house of the Parliament, and is usually the leader of the largest party. The Constitution limits the president's tenure to two five-year terms. The first president to be elected under the constitution was Sir Seretse Khama, who was the prime minister from 1965 until 1966, after which he served as president until his death on 13 July, 1980. The most recent incumbent is Duma Boko, who was elected by the National Assembly on 1 November 2024 following the 2024 general election. The president may be removed by a motion of no confidence.

== Presidential term ==
The president is elected to a five-year term that runs concurrently with the term of the National Assembly. Previously, a president could be reelected any number of times. In 1997, under the second president, Quett Masire, term limits were imposed on the office for the first time. Since 1998, the president has been limited to a total of 10 years in office (equivalent to two full terms), whether successive or separated. The first president for whom the term limits applied was Festus Mogae, who was required to leave office for good in 2008. Each president gets a guaranteed pension.

== Election ==
During the general election campaign, all candidates for the National Assembly declare whom they endorse for President when they lodge their nomination papers. If a party or alliance secures an absolute majority of elected MPs in the legislative elections, its presidential candidate, always the party or alliance's leader, becomes the new president immediately without the need for an investiture vote. In practice, since legislative elections are conducted through first-past-the-post voting, elections have always produced single-party majority governments ever since the first general election in 1965 and thus a presidential election by Members of Parliament has never happened.

The president is elected by the members of the National Assembly following a general election that produces a hung parliament. In the event that no candidate secures a simple majority, the National Assembly elects the president through secret ballot, with a simple majority of the total number of MPs (excluding 'specially-elected' MPs) required to win. This election is limited to candidates whose party at least 10 MPs. If, after three rounds of voting, no candidate is elected, two additional rounds may be authorized by the speaker, if it is deemed that a successful election remains possible. Should these rounds also fail to produce a winner, or if the speaker declines to authorise further rounds, the National Assembly will be dissolved and snap elections will be held.

The president's survival in office is dependent on whether their government enjoys the confidence of a majority of the National Assembly. They can be removed by a motion of no confidence, prompting their resignation or if not, the dissolution of parliament if the president refuses to do so, which triggers a snap election.

== Presidential powers ==
The president is the head of state, head of government and commander-in-chief of the Botswana Defence Force. The rights, responsibilities and remuneration of the president are enumerated in Chapter III of the Constitution and subsequent acts passed by the National Assembly.

The executive powers of the republic are vested in the president, who appoints various officials to positions listed in the Constitution, the most significant of which are the cabinet ministers and Justices of Appeal of the Court of Appeal. The president should consult the Cabinet on respective matters of policy. The president could assent or withhold his assent on bills passed by the National Assembly. If the National Assembly passed the bill again the President shall assent or withhold his assent within 21 days, or could dissolve the National Assembly. The president is accorded the constitutional powers to declare state of public emergencies and grant pardons or commutation with the advice of the Advisory Committee of Prerogative of Mercy.

== List of officeholders ==
Political parties

Botswana Democratic Party (BDP)
Botswana National Front (BNF)

No.	Portrait	Name (birth–death)	Term of office			Party	Elected	Government	Ref.
No.	Portrait	Name (birth–death)	Took office	Left office	Time in office	Party	Elected	Government	Ref.
1		Seretse Khama (1921–1980)	30 September 1966	13 July 1980 #	13 years, 287 days	Botswana Democratic Party	1965	Khama I	
1		Seretse Khama (1921–1980)	30 September 1966	13 July 1980 #	13 years, 287 days	Botswana Democratic Party	1969	Khama II	
1		Seretse Khama (1921–1980)	30 September 1966	13 July 1980 #	13 years, 287 days	Botswana Democratic Party	1974	Khama III	
1		Seretse Khama (1921–1980)	30 September 1966	13 July 1980 #	13 years, 287 days	Botswana Democratic Party	1979	Khama IV	
2		Quett Masire (1925–2017)	18 July 1980	31 March 1998	17 years, 256 days	Botswana Democratic Party	–	Masire I	
2		Quett Masire (1925–2017)	18 July 1980	31 March 1998	17 years, 256 days	Botswana Democratic Party	1984	Masire II	
2		Quett Masire (1925–2017)	18 July 1980	31 March 1998	17 years, 256 days	Botswana Democratic Party	1989	Masire III	
2		Quett Masire (1925–2017)	18 July 1980	31 March 1998	17 years, 256 days	Botswana Democratic Party	1994	Masire IV	
3		Festus Mogae (1939–2026)	1 April 1998	1 April 2008	10 years	Botswana Democratic Party	–	Mogae I	
3		Festus Mogae (1939–2026)	1 April 1998	1 April 2008	10 years	Botswana Democratic Party	1999	Mogae II	
3		Festus Mogae (1939–2026)	1 April 1998	1 April 2008	10 years	Botswana Democratic Party	2004	Mogae III	
4		Ian Khama (born 1953)	1 April 2008	1 April 2018	10 years	Botswana Democratic Party	–	Khama I	
4		Ian Khama (born 1953)	1 April 2008	1 April 2018	10 years	Botswana Democratic Party	2009	Khama II	
4		Ian Khama (born 1953)	1 April 2008	1 April 2018	10 years	Botswana Democratic Party	2014	Khama III	
5		Mokgweetsi Masisi (born 1961)	1 April 2018	1 November 2024	6 years, 214 days	Botswana Democratic Party	–	Masisi I	
5		Mokgweetsi Masisi (born 1961)	1 April 2018	1 November 2024	6 years, 214 days	Botswana Democratic Party	2019	Masisi II	
6		Duma Boko (born 1969)	1 November 2024	Incumbent	1 year, 358 days	Botswana National Front	2024	Boko	

== See also ==
- Politics of Botswana
- First Lady of Botswana
- List of commissioners of Bechuanaland
- List of heads of government of Botswana
- Vice-President of Botswana
