= Duma Boko =

President of Botswana since 2024

His Excellency Duma Boko
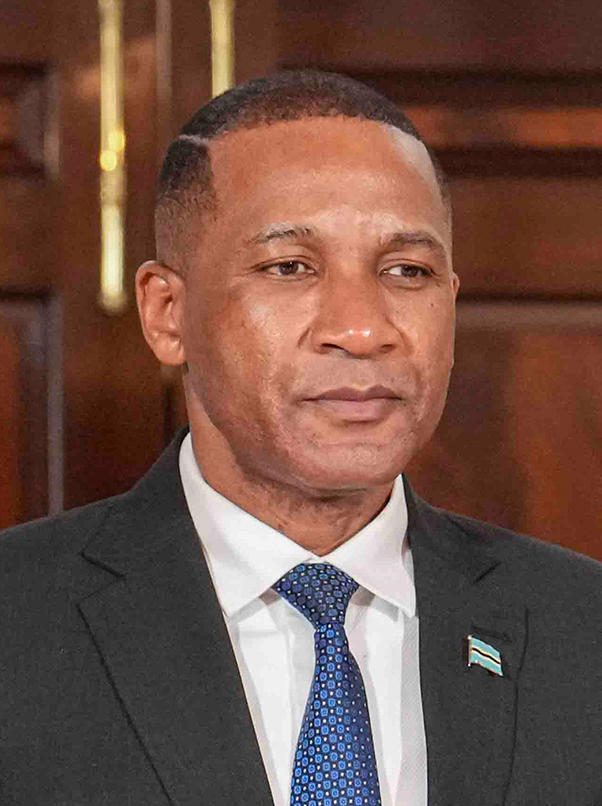
- Boko in 2025

6th President of Botswana
- Incumbent
- Assumed office 1 November 2024
- Vice President: Ndaba Gaolathe
- Preceded by: Mokgweetsi Masisi

President of the Umbrella for Democratic Change
- Incumbent
- Assumed office November 2012
- Vice President: Ndaba Gaolathe
- Preceded by: Office established

Leader of the Opposition
- In office 24 October 2014 – 23 October 2019
- President: Ian Khama; Mokgweetsi Masisi
- Preceded by: Dumelang Saleshando
- Succeeded by: Dumelang Saleshando

Personal details
- Born: 31 December 1969 (age 56) Mahalapye, Botswana
- Party: Botswana National Front
- Other political affiliations: Umbrella for Democratic Change
- Spouse: Kaone Boko
- Education: University of Botswana (LLB); Harvard University (LLM)
- Profession: Politician; lawyer; professor
- Cabinet: Boko cabinet
- Website: Campaign website

Duma Gideon Boko (born 31 December 1969) is a Motswana politician and lawyer who is currently serving as the sixth president of Botswana since 1 November 2024 and as President of the Umbrella for Democratic Change since 2012. He served as Leader of the Opposition from 2014 to 2019.

Boko attained the presidency of the BNF in 2010. He led the creation of the Umbrella for Democratic Change, an alliance of the main opposition parties in Botswana. He ran as the alliance's president in Botswana's general elections in 2014 and 2019. At the 2024 election, he led his party to victory and was sworn in as President of Botswana on 1 November 2024. He is the first, and so far the only president in Botswana's history not to belong to the Botswana Democratic Party. Boko is considered a social democrat.

== Early life ==
Boko was born in Botswana's Central District, in the village of Mahalapye. His father, who died in 2004, worked as a lecturer at Madiba Brigades. He has a sister, Emma Boko.

In 1987, Boko studied law at the University of Botswana. He was elected to the Student Representative Council (SRC). Among his law classmates were High Court judges Michael Leburu, Key Dingake, Bengbame Sechele and Lot Moroka. After graduating in 1993, he attended Harvard Law School, where he obtained a Master of Laws degree.

== Career ==
Boko returned to teach law at University of Botswana from 1993 to 2003, while also running a law firm. In the early 2000s, he wrote a column in the newspaper The Monitor in which he claimed that judges were not intellectually progressive. He expressed frustration that academics and judges were not doing enough research to make informed judgements.

== Politics ==
Boko became the leader of the Botswana National Front (BNF) in 2010. His position and party membership was challenged on the grounds that when the BNF split in 2000, he had become a founding member of the National Democratic Front (NDF). If proven, this would, according to the BNF constitution, disqualify him from a leadership position in the party for three years after rejoining it. He prevailed in court. He inherited a party that was in decline under the leadership of Otsweletse Moupo.

The BNF came together with the newly formed Botswana Movement for Democracy (BMD), a splinter of the Botswana Democratic Party, and the Botswana Peoples Party to form the Umbrella for Democratic Change. Some BNF members were strongly against the coalition, arguing that the exercise would make their party disappear. Lawsuits against Boko and his central committee were filed before the High Court. Boko and the BNF won all the court challenges.

=== 2014 general election ===
In the 2014 general election, Boko led the UDC to a second-place finish in the National Assembly, winning 17 seats to the Botswana Democratic Party's (BDP) 37. Boko became the leader of the opposition.

=== 2019 general election ===
In the 2019 general election, Boko was defeated by Anna Mokgethi of the BDP in the Gaborone Bonnington North constituency. As a result of his defeat, he lost his title of leader of the opposition in the 12th National Assembly. Boko claimed that during the 2019 general election, there was massive vote rigging and fraud by the BDP to favour President Mokgweetsi Masisi. He claimed that there was discontinuation of election ink and an excess of voter's registration cards.

=== 2024 general election ===
Despite both the Botswana Congress Party and Botswana Patriotic Front leaving the UDC, Boko's party, and the opposition as a whole, were able to take a majority of seats in the elections while reducing the long-dominant BDP to a rump of four seats. As leader of the majority alliance in the legislature, Boko became the president-elect. He was sworn into office on 1 November, with a more public ceremony held on 8 November. Boko's ascent to the presidency marked the first time since 1966, when Botswana became independent, that a former opposition party has won an election.

== Presidency ==
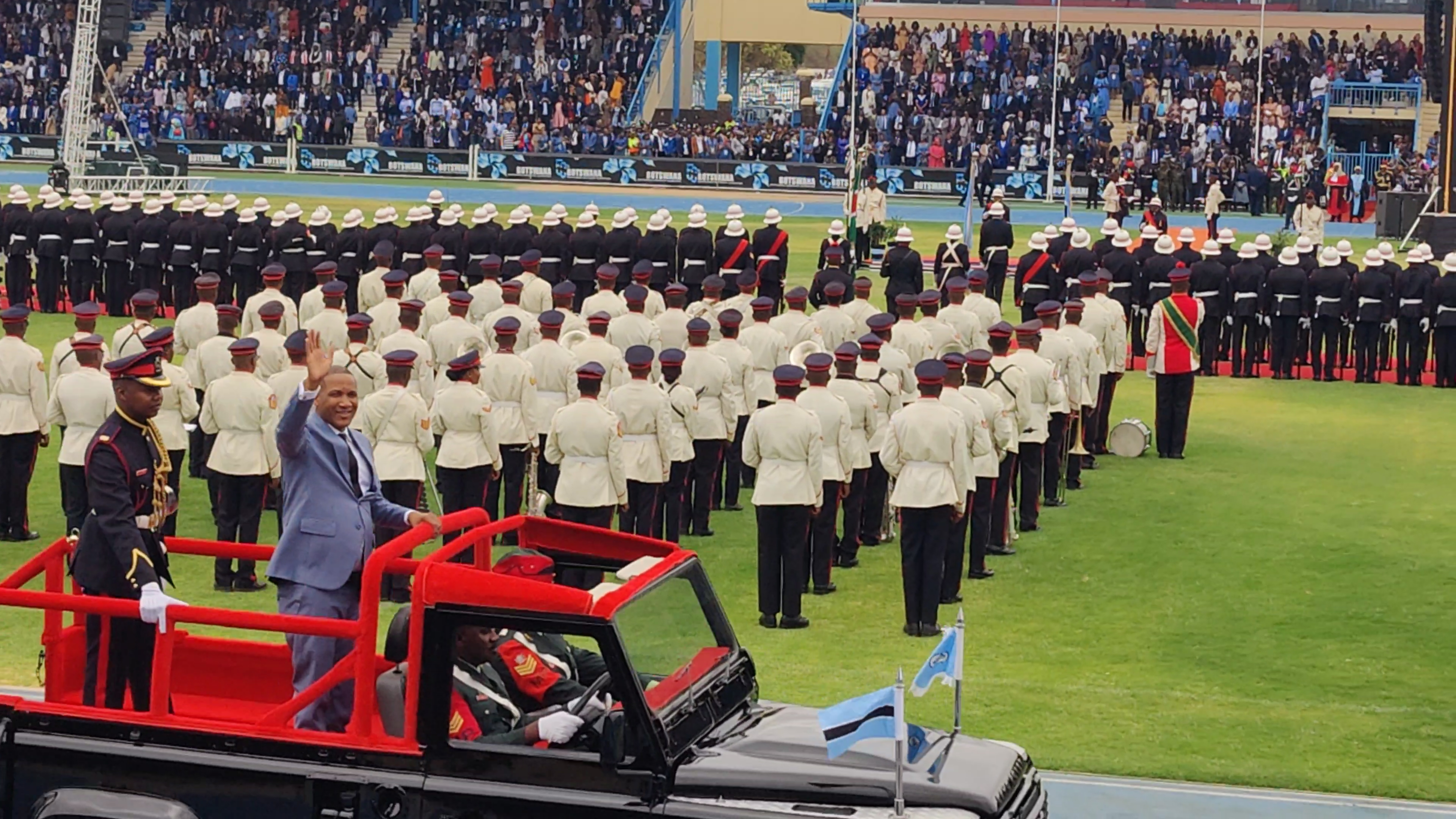
President Duma Boko at Inauguration Parade at National Stadium

During his 2024 campaign, Boko pledged to diversify the country's economy away from resource extraction, and raise wages, students' allowances, and pensions. As president, Boko stated his intention to granting temporary work and residence permits to undocumented Zimbabweans and renegotiate economic agreements with De Beers regarding Botswana's diamond industry.

In his first State of the Nation Address in November 2024, Boko said that his government would push for increased investment into solar energy, medicinal cannabis and industrial hemp. He also announced engagements with Elon Musk to extend affordable internet access nationwide through Starlink. In March 2025, Boko attended the launch of Botswana's first satellite, BOTSAT-1, into space. The launch took place from SpaceX facilities in California, USA.

On 7 August 2025, Boko joined the Advisory Board of the Global Center on Adaptation. On 25 August 2025, Boko declared a nationwide public health emergency due to the 2025 medical crisis caused by the shortages of medicine and supplies in hospitals caused by budget shortfalls and reduction of aid from the United States. Following the crisis, Duma Boko stated that the country's healthcare system would see numerous reforms to prevent a similar crisis from happening in the future. Reforms included a restructuring of the national medicines procurement body, the expansion of public medicine, and the creation of a national health intelligence centre. Additionally, Boko stated that the African Continental Free Trade Area would help expand regional pharmaceutical industries.

In September 2026, Boko invited Haitham bin Tariq of Oman for a two-day State Visit to Botswana from 16 to 17 September 2026. The visit came at the invitation of President Boko and focused on strengthening bilateral cooperation and expanding economic ties between the two countries. Official talks covered a range of sectors including trade and investment, minerals and mining, energy, infrastructure, agriculture, tourism and health. The visit formed part of broader efforts to strengthen relations between African countries and partners in the Gulf and wider Middle East.

=== Foreign policy ===
Shortly after his election, Boko said he favoured an even-handed, neutral foreign policy, citing Switzerland as a model, while pursuing more disruptive change on domestic matters. In January 2025, Boko and Chinese leader Xi Jinping exchanged congratulatory messages marking the 50th anniversary of diplomatic relations between Botswana and China.

==== United States ====
In March 2025, Boko travelled to Washington, D.C., where he met U.S. Secretary of State Marco Rubio. The two reaffirmed the strategic partnership between their countries, particularly in trade and regional security. Relations were subsequently dominated by trade. A 37 percent U.S. tariff on Botswanan goods took effect on 1 August 2025, threatening the country's diamond exports, and Boko's attempts to have it delayed through direct engagement with the Trump administration were unsuccessful. In July 2025, the government tabled a proposal offering the United States first access to explore three geological zones believed to hold critical minerals. By October 2025 the tariff on Botswanan imports stood at 15 per cent, and Boko told the BBC that talks on duty-free access for Botswana-processed diamonds were at an advanced stage. Describing his approach to the U.S. president in 2026, Boko said, "President Trump is America First, I am Botswana First."

==== Regional and other relations ====
Boko's government announced plans to grant temporary work and residence permits to undocumented Zimbabweans living in Botswana. In September 2026, he hosted Haitham bin Tariq of Oman on a state visit, part of wider efforts to deepen ties with Gulf states.

== Publications ==
- Boko, D. G. (1998). "Towards a compensatory approach to redressing constitutional violations in Botswana". The Zimbabwe Law Review. 15: 120–133.
- Boko, Duma Gideon (1 December 2002). "Integrating the Basarwa under Botswana's Remote Area Development Programme: Empowerment or marginalisation?". Australian Journal of Human Rights. 8 (2): 153–171. doi:10.1080/1323238x.2002.11911087. ISSN 1323-238X.
- Boko, Duma Gideon (1 December 2000). "Fair Trial and the Customary Courts in Botswana: Questions on Legal Representation". Criminal Law Forum. 11 (4): 445–460. doi:10.1023/A:1016667617539. ISSN 1572-9850.

Political offices
Preceded by Mokgweetsi Masisi	President of Botswana; 2024–present	Incumbent
