= Commander of the Defence Force (Botswana) =

Commander of the Botswana Defence Force
- Botswana Defence Force flag

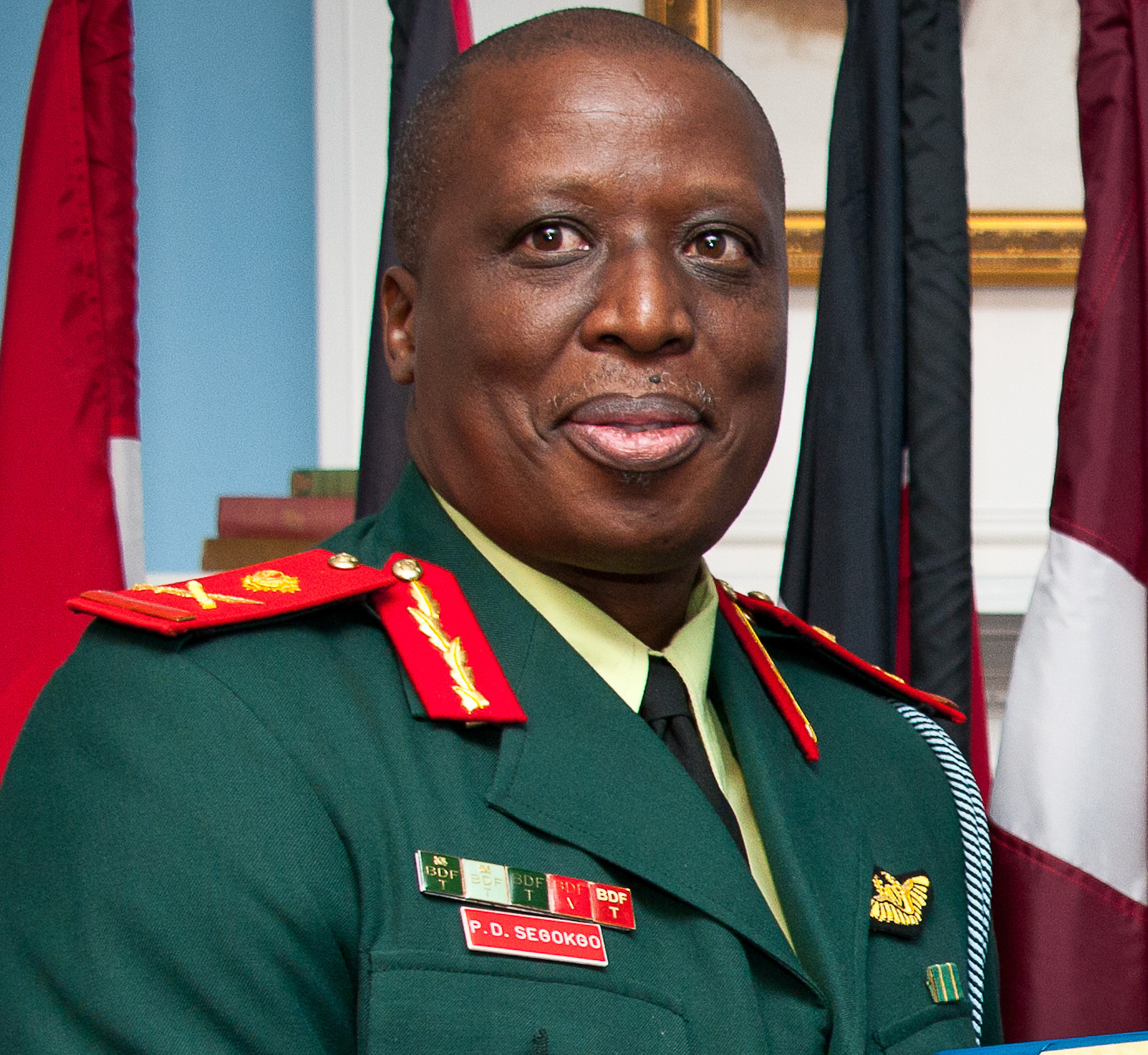
- Incumbent; General Mpho Churchill Orebotse Mophuting since 3 November 2025
- Abbreviation: Commander, BDF
- Reports to: Minister of Defence, Justice and Security
- Appointer: The president
- Formation: 1977
- First holder: Mompati Merafhe

The commander of the Botswana Defence Force is the highest-ranking military officer in the Botswana Defence Force and is responsible for maintaining control over the service branches.

== List of officeholders ==
The former heads of the Botswana Armed Forces were referred to while in office as either general officers commanding or commander of the Botswana Defence Force.

No.	Portrait	Name (birth–death)	Term of office			Ref.
No.	Portrait	Name (birth–death)	Took office	Left office	Time in office	Ref.
1		Lieutenant general Mompati Merafhe (1936–2015)	1977	1989	11–12 years	
2		Lieutenant general Ian Khama (born 1953)	1989	1998	8–9 years	
3		Lieutenant general Louis Matshwenyego Fisher	1998	1 November 2006	7–8 years	
4		Lieutenant general Tebogo Masire	1 November 2006	1 August 2012	5 years, 274 days	
5		Lieutenant general Gaolatlhe Galebotswe	1 August 2012	8 September 2016	4 years, 38 days	
6		Lieutenant general Placid Diratsagae Segokgo	8 September 2016	3 November 2025	9 years, 364 days	
