= Military ranks of Botswana =

The military ranks of Botswana are those of the Botswana Defence Force. As a landlocked country, Botswana has no navy.

== Commissioned officer ranks ==
The rank insignia of commissioned officers.

Rank group	General / flag officers			Senior officers			Junior officers
Botswana Ground Force
Botswana Ground Force	Lieutenant general	Major general	Brigadier	Colonel	Lieutenant colonel	Major	Captain	First lieutenant	Second lieutenant
Botswana Defence Force Air Wing
Botswana Defence Force Air Wing		Major general	Brigadier	Colonel	Lieutenant colonel	Major	Captain	First lieutenant	Second lieutenant
Rank group	General / flag officers			Senior officers			Junior officers

=== Student officer ranks ===
Rank group	Student officers
Botswana Defence Force
Botswana Defence Force	Senior under officer	Under officer	Junior under officer	Officer cadet

== Other ranks ==
The rank insignia of non-commissioned officers and enlisted personnel.

Rank group	Senior NCOs				Junior NCOs		Enlisted
Botswana Ground Force							No insignia
Botswana Ground Force	Warrant officer class 1	Warrant officer class 2	Staff sergeant	Sergeant	Corporal	Lance corporal	Private (or equivalent)
Botswana Defence Force Air Wing							No insignia
Botswana Defence Force Air Wing	Warrant officer class 1	Warrant officer class 2	Staff sergeant	Sergeant	Corporal	Lance corporal	Private (or equivalent)
Rank group	Senior NCOs				Junior NCOs		Enlisted

Rank group	Army sergeant majors
	Regiment/battalion sergeant major	Brigade sergeant major	Major command sergeant major	Force sergeant major
