= Tebogo Masire =

Motswana general

Tebogo Masire is the former deputy commander and former commander of the Botswana Defence Force (BDF). He assumed the post on November 1, 2006, succeeding Lt. Gen. Louis Matshwenyego Fisher.

Under his command, in March 2007, the BDF began recruiting females into military service, though Masire has emphasised that female recruits will not receive special treatment.

Preceded by Louis Matshwenyego Fisher	Commander of the Botswana Defence Force; November 1, 2006 – July 2012	Succeeded by Gaolathe Galebotswe
