= List of equipment of the Botswana Ground Force =

This is a list of the equipment used by the Botswana Ground Force.

== Small arms ==
Name	Image	Caliber	Type	Origin	Notes
Pistols
Browning Hi-Power		9×19mm	Semi-automatic pistol	Belgium; United States	
Submachine guns
Sten		9×19mm	Submachine gun	United Kingdom	
Sterling		9×19mm	Submachine gun	United Kingdom	
Uzi		9×19mm	Submachine gun	Israel	
Rifles
AKM		7.62×39mm	Assault rifle	Soviet Union	
IMI Galil		5.56×45mm	Assault rifle	Israel	
M16		5.56×45mm	Assault rifle	United States	
ArmaLite AR-18		5.56×45mm	Assault rifle	United States	
Colt Canada C7		5.56×45mm	Assault rifle	Canada	
FN SCAR		5.56×45mm	Assault rifle	Belgium	
SA80		5.56×45mm	Bullpup assault rifle	United Kingdom	
SAR-21		5.56×45mm	Bullpup assault rifle	Singapore	
FN FAL		7.62×51mm	Battle rifle	Belgium	Currently being phased out by the SAR-21
Heckler & Koch G3		7.62×51mm	Battle rifle	West Germany	
Machine guns
Bren		7.62×51mm	Light machine gun	Czechoslovakia; United Kingdom	
Browning M1919		7.62×51mm	Medium machine gun	United States	
FN MAG		7.62×51mm	General-purpose machine gun	Belgium	
Browning M2		.50 BMG	Heavy machine gun	United States	
Rocket propelled grenade launchers
RPG-7		40mm	Rocket-propelled grenade	Soviet Union	

== Anti-tank weapons ==
Name	Image	Type	Origin	Caliber	Notes
Carl Gustav		Recoilless rifle	Sweden	84mm	
MILAN		Anti-tank missile	France West Germany		
BGM-71 TOW		Anti-tank missile	United States		

== Tanks ==
Name	Image	Type	Origin	Quantity	Status	Notes
SK-105 Kürassier		Light tank	Austria	20		
FV101 Scorpion		Light tank	United Kingdom	25		

== Armored vehicles ==
Name	Image	Type	Origin	Quantity	Status	Notes
Panhard VBL		Scout car	France	64		

== Armored personnel carriers ==
Name	Image	Type	Origin	Quantity	Status	Notes
BTR-60		Armored personnel carrier	Soviet Union	50		
FV103 Spartan		Armored personnel carrier	United Kingdom	6		
Cadillac Gage Commando		Armored personnel carrier	United States	14		
Mowag Piranha IIIC		Armored personnel carrier	Switzerland	45		Ordered in 2002, in service from 2003

== Reconnaissance ==
Name	Image	Type	Origin	Quantity	Status	Notes
RAM MK3		Armored fighting vehicle	Israel	8		
Mowag Piranha III		Armored fighting vehicle	Switzerland	45		

== Utility vehicles ==
Name	Image	Type	Origin	Quantity	Status	Notes
ACMAT		Utility vehicle	France	150		
RMMV TG MIL		Utility truck	Germany; Austria	200		

== Engineering vehicles ==
Name	Image	Type	Origin	Quantity	Status	Notes
M578 LRV		Armored recovery vehicle	United States	Unknown		
SB-20 Greif		Armored recovery vehicle	Austria	Unknown		

== Demining vehicles ==
Name	Image	Type	Origin	Quantity	Status	Notes
Aardvark JSFU		Demining vehicle	United Kingdom	Unknown		

== Artillery ==
Name	Image	Type	Origin	Quantity	Status	Notes
Self-propelled artillery
ATMOS 2000		Self-propelled artillery	Israel	12		
Rocket artillery
APRA-40		Multiple rocket launcher	Soviet Union; Romania	20		
Field artillery
Soltam M-71		Howitzer	Israel	18		
L118		Howitzer	United Kingdom	12		
OTO Melara Mod 56		Howitzer	Italy	6		

== Air defence systems ==
Name	Image	Type	Origin	Quantity	Status	Notes
M167 VADS		Rotary cannon	United States	7		
MICA (missile)		Surface-to-air missile	France	Unknown		
Javelin		Surface-to-air missile	United Kingdom			5 launchers.
9K32 Strela-2		MANPADS	Soviet Union			
9K38 Igla		MANPADS	Soviet Union			

== Riverine equipment ==
- 2 × Boston Whaler Raider-class PCs (United States)
- 10 × Panther airboats (United States)
