= Louis Matshwenyego Fisher =

Louis Matshwenyego Fisher was commander of the Botswana Defence Force (BDF) from 1998 to 2006. He is a recipient of the Légion d'honneur and a Presidential Order of Honour.

Born in the village of Tsau in Ngamiland District, now part of North-West District, Fisher received his primary education in Maun, at the Moremi III Primary School, and his secondary education at Materi Spei College in Francistown. He attended the University of Botswana and graduated in 1978 with a Bachelor of Arts degree in political science. He joined the BDF the same year.

Over the next twenty years, Fisher attended and graduated from the Command and General Staff College (CGSC), the U.S. Army War College (USAWC), and the Naval Postgraduate School, and acquired master's degrees in Business Administration and Public Administration. In 1998, he was inducted into the International Officer Hall of Fame of the CGSC and the International Fellows Hall of Fame of the USAWC.

He assumed command of the BDF in 1998, succeeding Seretse Ian Khama, son of ex-President Sir Seretse Khama, paramount chief of the Bangwato tribe, and current President of Botswana. He retired on 1 November 2006, succeeded by Tebogo Masire.

Fisher is now the ambassador for the embassy of Botswana in Nigeria.

Preceded by Seretse Ian Khama	Commander of the Botswana Defence Force; 1998 – November 1, 2006	Succeeded by Tebogo Masire
