= Botswana Defence Force =

Military of Botswana

- Sesole Sa Botswana
- Botswana Defence Force emblem

- Flag of the Botswana Defence Force
- Motto: Thebe Ya Sechaba (transl. Shield of the Nation)
- Founded: 1977
- Current form: 2020
- Service branches: Botswana Ground Force; Air Arm Command
- Headquarters: Gaborone
- Website: Official website

Leadership
- President: Duma Boko
- Minister of State Presidency, Defence and Security: Moeti Mohwasa
- BDF Commander: General Mpho Churchill Mophuting

Personnel
- Military age: 18
- Active personnel: 12,000
- Deployed personnel: 500

Expenditure
- Budget: $537 million (2019)
- Percent of GDP: 2.87% (2019)

Industry
- Foreign suppliers: France; United States; Russia; Germany; Israel; Ukraine

Related articles
- History: Military history of Botswana
- Ranks: Military ranks of Botswana

The Botswana Defence Force (BDF, Tswana: Sesole Sa Botswana) is the military of Botswana. The main component of the BDF is the Botswana Ground Force; there is also an Air Arm Command (Botswana) and a riverine patrol contingent attached to the ground forces, with 10 Panther airboats and 2 Boston Whaler Raider class.

== History ==
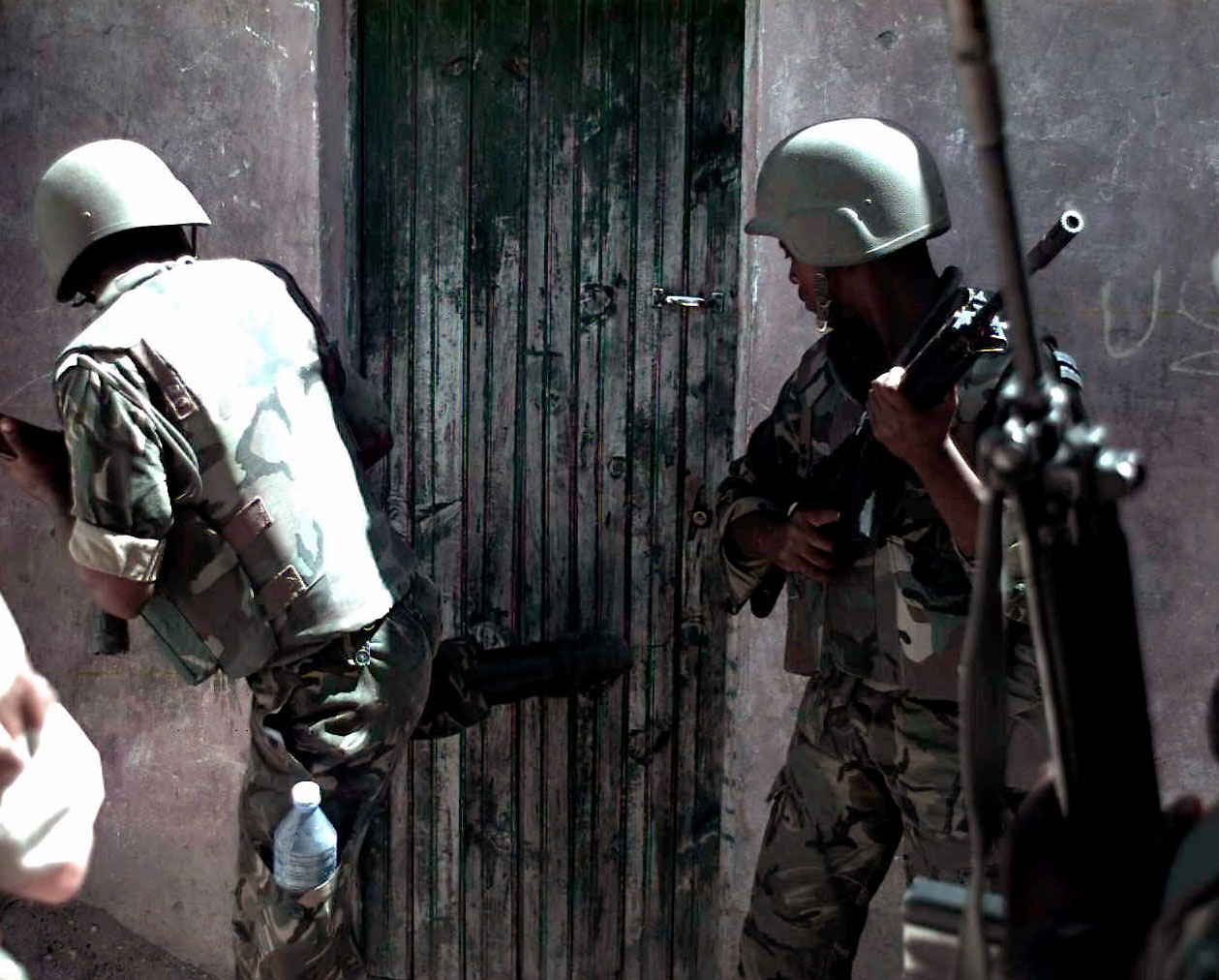
BDF soldiers conducting a raid in Mogadishu's Bakaara Market during Operation Restore Hope in 1993

At independence in 1966, Botswana made a decision to not establish a standing military and focus instead on development and poverty alleviation, and instead created a small military police force for internal security. However the Botswanan government allowed militant groups to operate from their territory and carry out attacks (including terrorist attacks) against neighbouring Rhodesia. The resulting cross-border incursions by Rhodesian and South African security forces in the mid-1970s led the government to conclude that the country needed a military to prevent this. The BDF was established by an act of parliament on 15 April 1977.

The BDF conducted patrols along the border with Rhodesia in the closing years of the Rhodesian Bush War. Following the end of the war and the independence of Zimbabwe in 1980, attention shifted towards South Africa. Anti-apartheid groups, as well as militants and terrorists, used Botswana as a refuge, and this led to several cross-border raids by the South African Defence Force. A turning point was the Raid on Gaborone on 14 June 1985, following apartheid South Africa's raid in Gaborone, which resulted in the deaths of four members of the Medu Art Ensemble. The BDF came under pressure to stop these attacks, but never managed to fire a shot at South African troops. The BDF set up roadblocks and imposed curfews in response to the incursions.

Following the end of apartheid, the BDF's missions increasingly focused on anti-poaching activities, disaster-preparedness and response (including search and rescue), support to civil authorities and foreign peacekeeping. A well-respected institution trusted by the political leadership, the BDF has seen its role increase over time to include non-traditional missions such as disaster response and reinforcement of the police during the holiday season and high crime periods. The BDF's professionalism and ability to successfully accomplish any task the government gives it has at times resulted in overtasking in support to civil authorities. In 2015 the BDF recruited its first female privates.

=== Modernisation & hardware upgrades ===
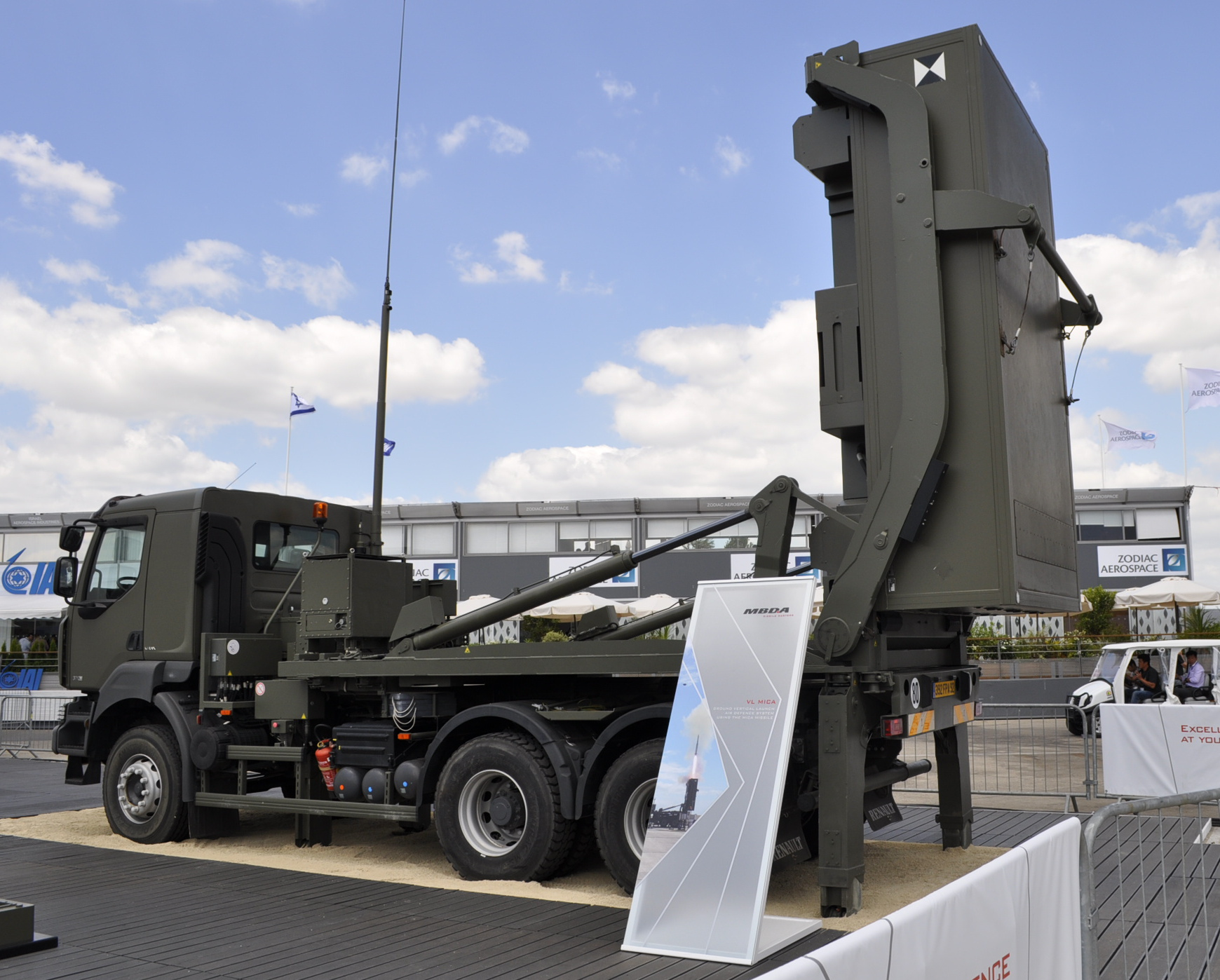
MBDA MICA VL Air Defence System

From 2001 Botswana has spent millions in a modernisation drive of its armed forces. The BDF seeks to replace assets such as aircraft, vehicles and defence equipment and also training Batswana aircraft engineers and technicians.

The Botswana Defence Force (BDF) is expected to continue with the acquisition of new equipment, specifically fighter/trainer aircraft, aerial defence systems, tanks and armoured personnel carriers. Other procurements include a deal for 45 Piranha III armoured vehicles from Swiss company GDELS-Mowag, and artillery equipment from Elbit Systems in Israel. Botswana in 2020 received the VL MICA ground-based air defense system; additionally, a Panhard VBL—fitted with a missile launcher assembly most likely for the Mistral surface-to-air missile system—has been observed. Others include a Unimog U5000-mounted Mistral command post, a VL MICA anti-aircraft missile transporter-erector-launcher truck, and a VL MICA truck-mounted radar or command post vehicle. According to the report, France delivered 14 missile launchers to Botswana in 2016.

The Stockholm International Peace Research Institute's Arms Transfer Database notes that Botswana bought 100 Strela-3/SA-14 surface-to-air missiles from Ukraine in 2012. The BDF has also confirmed negotiations with Swedish aircraft manufacturer Försvarets Materielverk (FMV) for the acquisition of between eight and 12 JAS Gripen "C" and "D" aircraft variants to replace its ageing fleet of Canadian-made CF-5 fighter jets. The BDF's search for new military hardware has also taken it to South Korea as it shows interest in modified K2 Black Panther main battle tanks.

The Botswana Defence Force (BDF) is in the process of procuring data extraction and analytical tools to upgrade their cyber force to boost cyberwarfare, cybersecurity, and counter-cyberwarfare.

=== Domestic missions ===
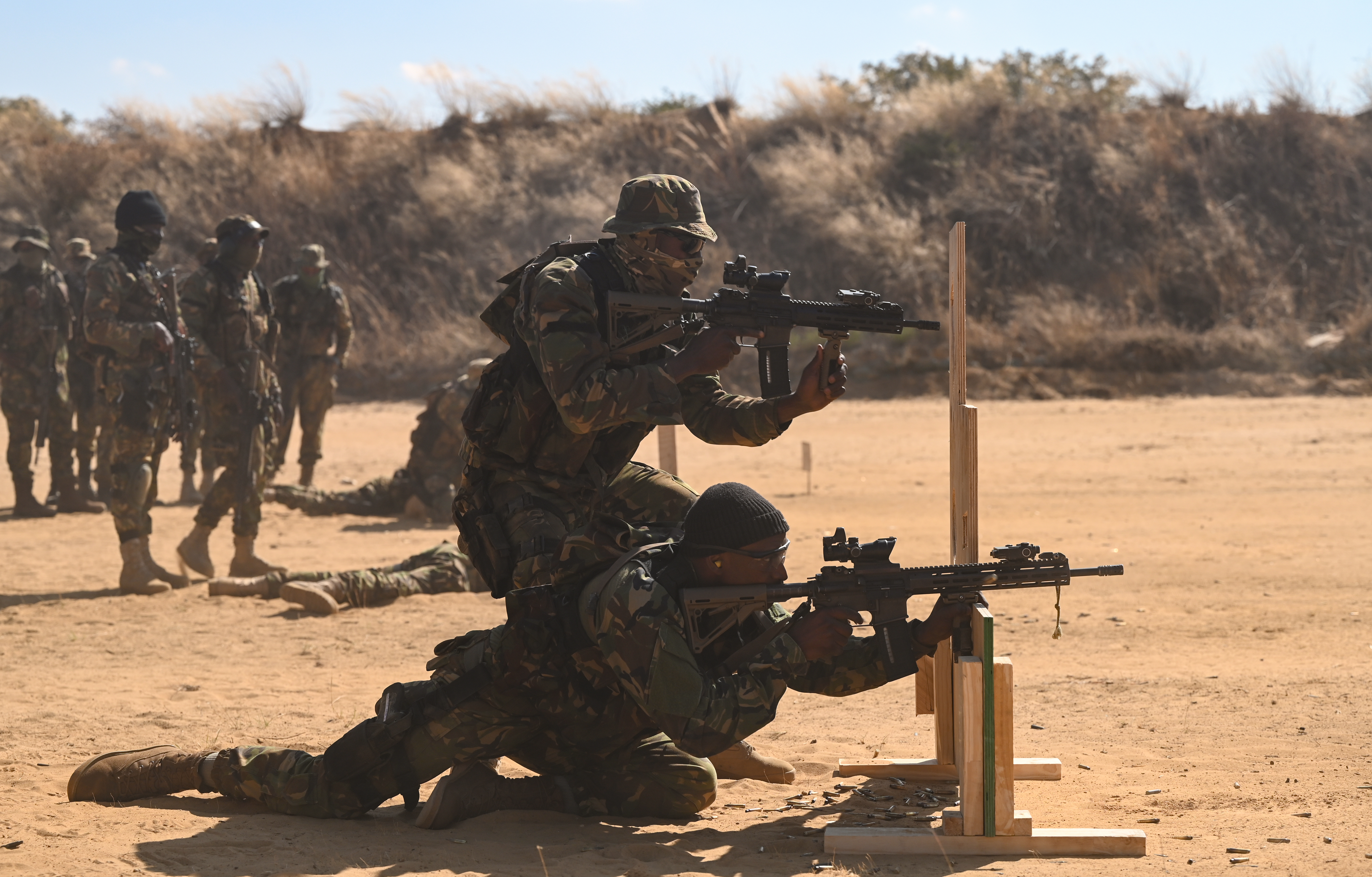
Members of the Botswana Defence Force practice shooting during a training exercise

In 1995, the BDF undertook rescue missions during floods that hit major parts of the country. The following year, it deployed soldiers and equipment at Sua Pan in 'Operation Save Sua' to save the berm wall of Botswana Ash (Botash) plant, which was being threatened by heavy floods. The soldiers laid 90,000 sandbags and 12,000 tyres in the operation.

During the floods that hit Ramotswa and its surrounding areas in February 2006, BDF teams carried out rescue missions and saved hundreds of lives. In 2009, the BDF provided assistance during the flooding that affected a large community around the Kasane area.

The BDF also engages in anti-poaching operations to protect wildlife. BDF soldiers operate under shoot-to-kill orders and have engaged in firefights with armed poachers. Dozens of poachers have been killed or arrested in BDF operations. In 2020 a BDF soldier was killed along with a poacher during a firefight in the Moremi Game Reserve.

=== International Peace Support Operations ===
United Nations Operation in Somalia II (UNOSOM II) In 1992 and 1993, a BDF contingent participated in Operation Restore Hope, a United States-led coalition of forces to restore peace in Somalia during the Somali Civil War, and following the end of Operation Restore Hope, the BDF participated in UNOSOM II, a subsequent UN peacekeeping mission in Somalia that lasted from 1993 to 1995.

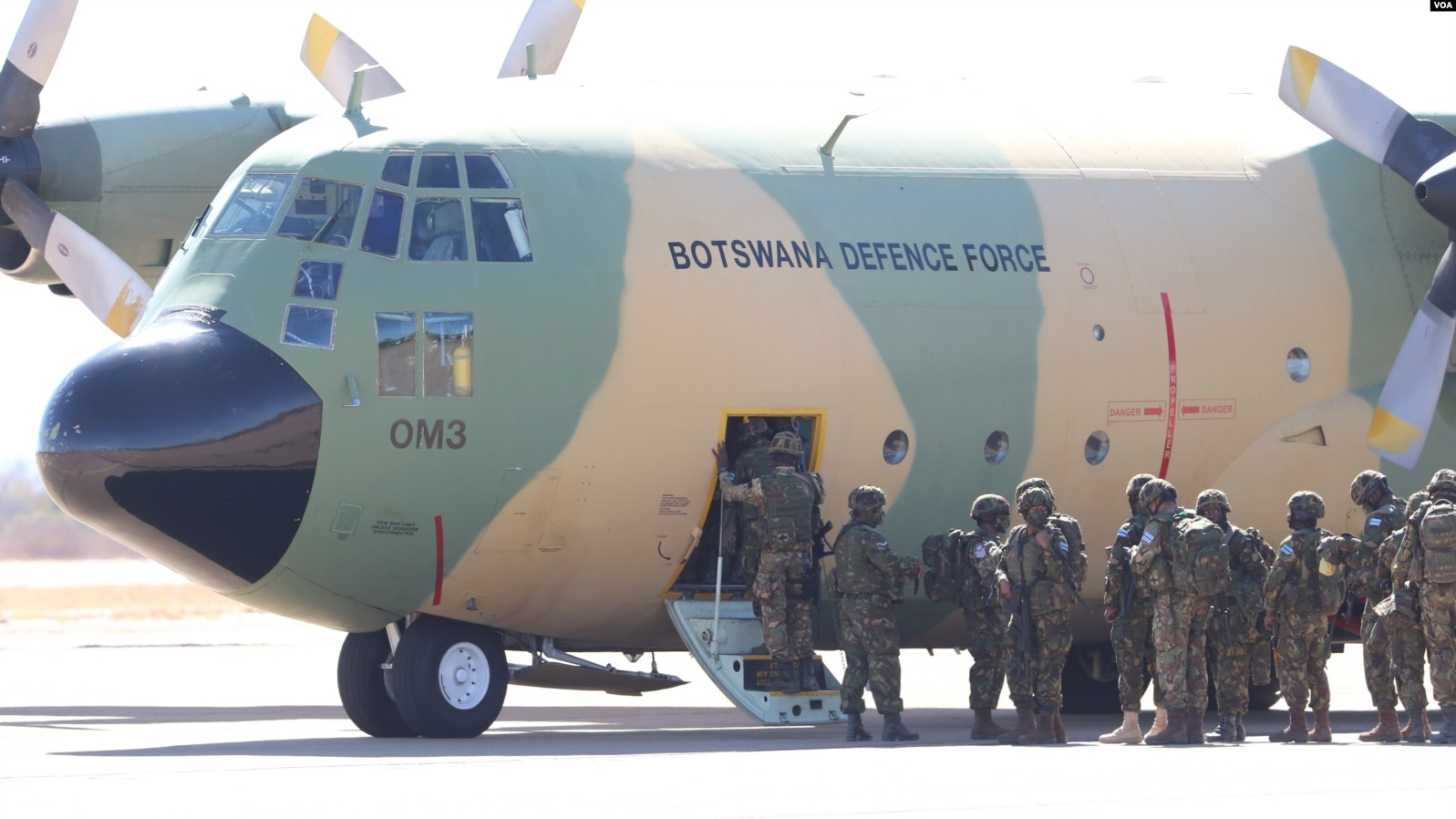
Botswanan troops deployment to Mozambique in July 2021

United Nations Operation in Mozambique (ONUMOZ) In 1993 BDF troops participated in the United Nations Operation in Mozambique, the UN peacekeeping operation in Mozambique.

United Nations Assistance Mission for Rwanda (UNAMIR II) From 1993 to 1994, a team of BDF officers participated in a UN peacekeeping mission in Rwanda as observers.

Southern African Development Community intervention in Lesotho (Operation Boleas) The BDF participated in Operation Boleas, a SADC military intervention in Lesotho in 1998. This operation culminated in a re-training programme for Lesotho Defence Force members. From 1998 to 1999, 380 BDF soldiers formed part of a Southern African Development Community (SADC) task force to quell an internal uprising in Lesotho. Botswana withdrew its contingent when the situation was thought to be stable enough to no longer require their presence.

Southern African Development Community Mission in Mozambique (SAMIM) In July 2021 Botswana deployed troops to Mozambique to take part in the Southern African Development Community (SADC) mission there as part of the SADC Standby Force deployed to provide regional support to the Republic of Mozambique to combat the looming threat of terrorism and acts of violent extremism in the Cabo Delgado Region.

=== Minor deployments ===
The BDF has also been successfully deployed as part of the UN peacekeeping operations in both Somalia and the Darfur region of Sudan.

The BDF has also deployed personnel to serve on an African Union Liaison Mission in Ethiopia/Eritrea and has military observers in Darfur and Sudan with UNAMID.

== Organisation ==
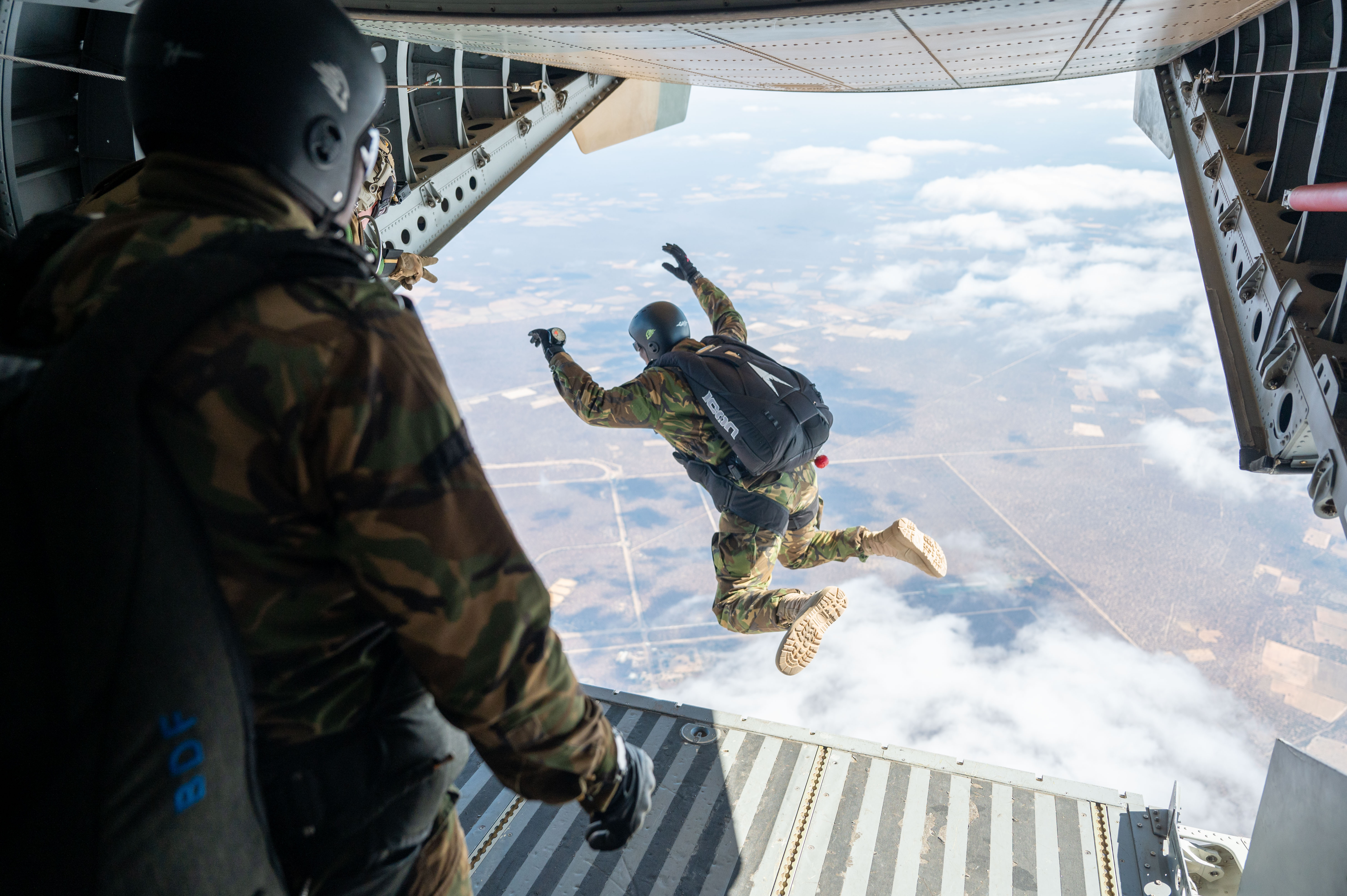
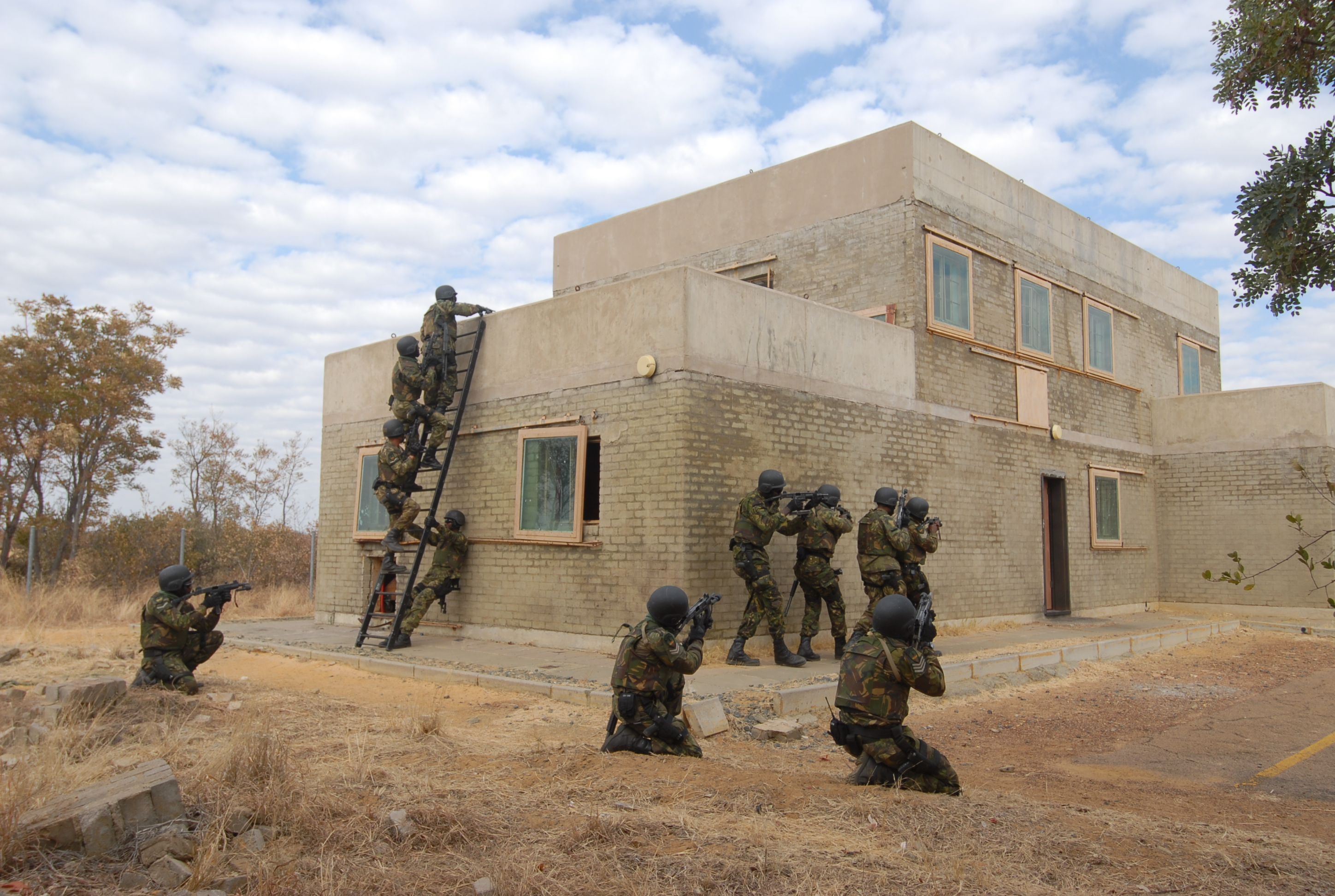
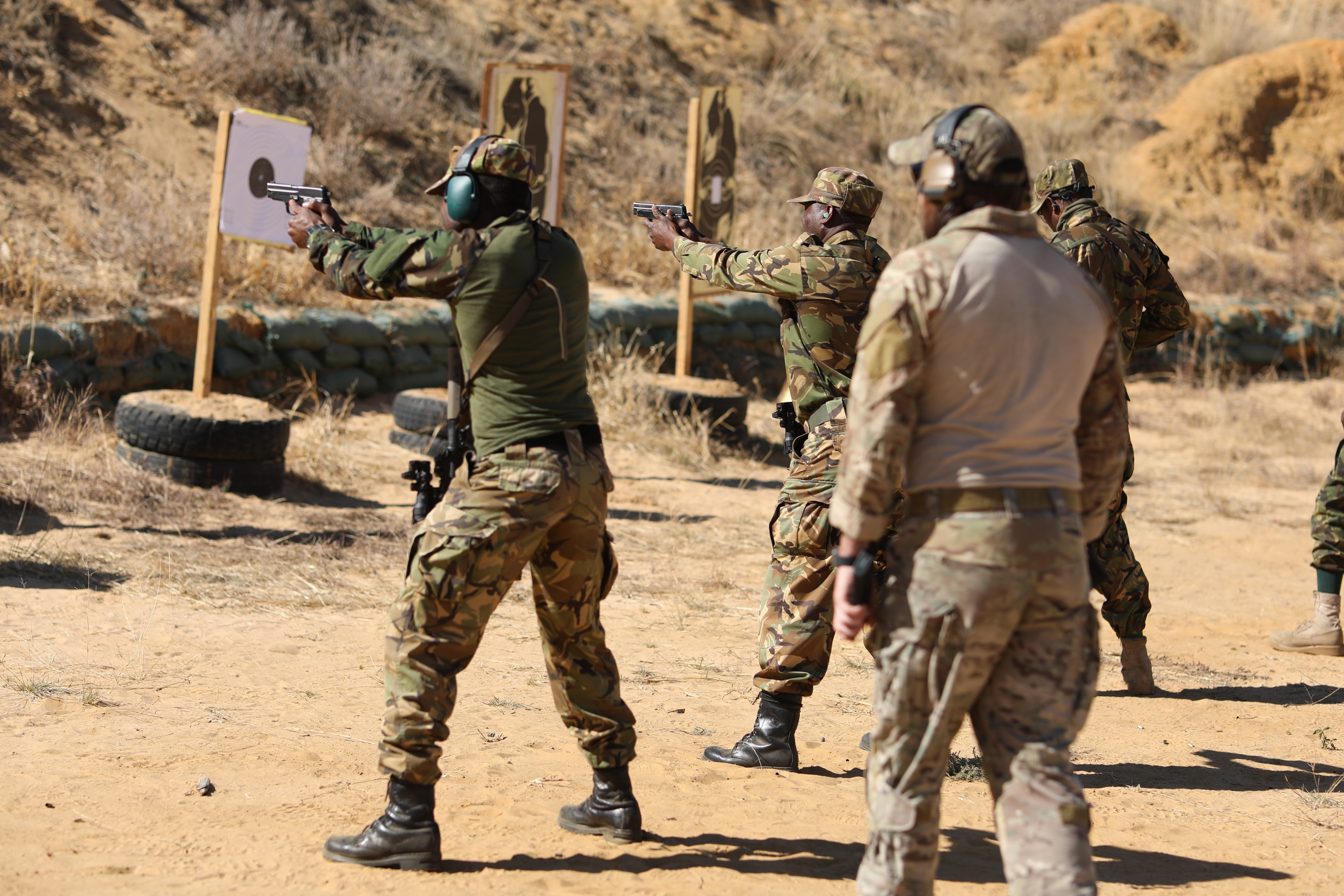
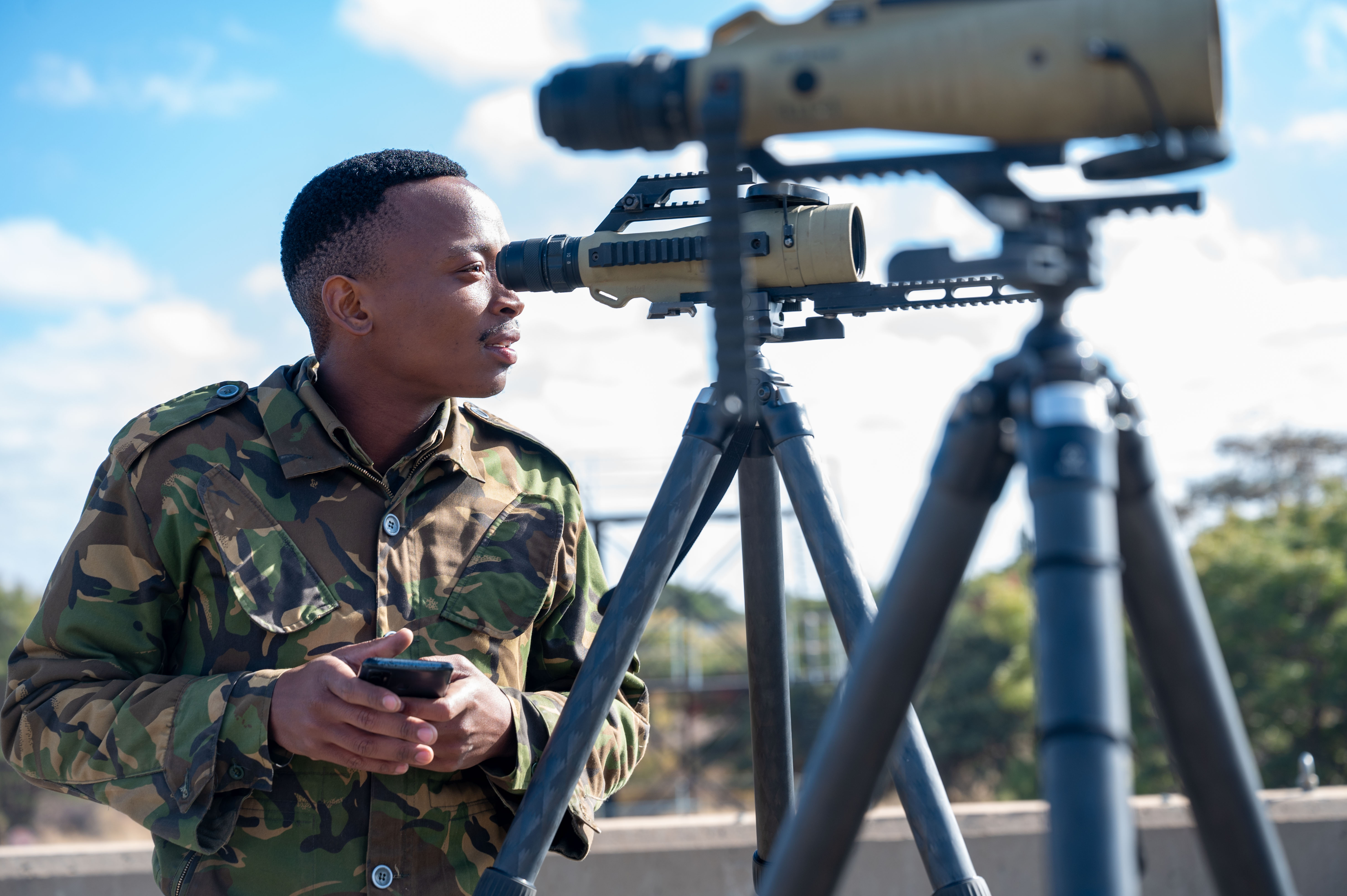

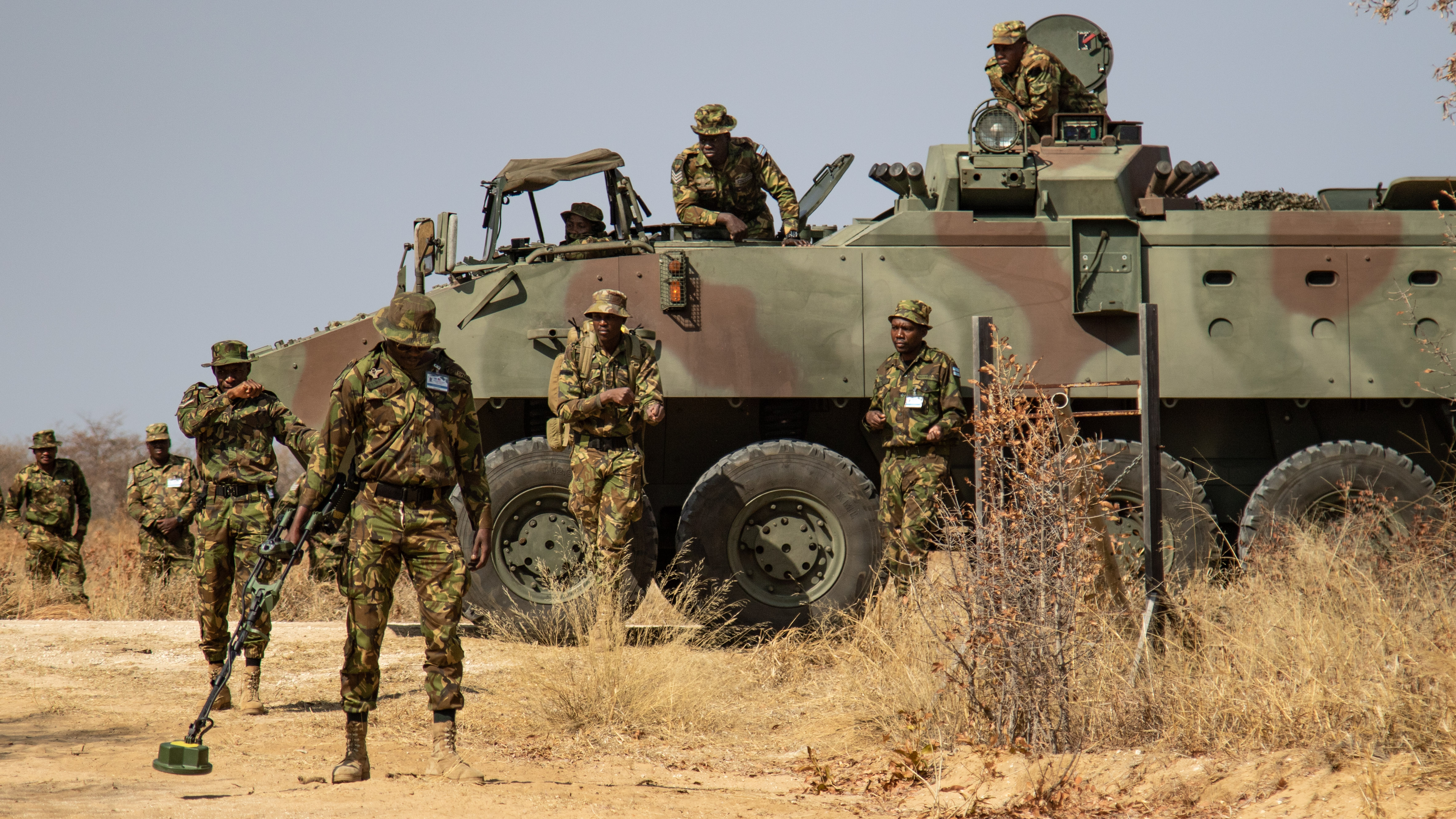
Botswana Defence Force Training

The BDF ground forces consist of the following units:

- 1 under-strength armored brigade
- 2 light infantry brigades (one armoured reconnaissance regiment, four infantry battalions, one commando unit, two air defence artillery regiments, one engineer regiment and one logistics battalion.)
- 1 artillery brigade
- 1 under-strength air defence brigade
- 1 engineering company
- 1 signals company
- 1 logistics group

The BDF Command and Staff College is located at Glenn Valley.

== Military education and training ==
The training of officer cadets lasts 12 months at the Paje Officer Academy. The course includes basic and leadership skills training. Applicants are required to have at least a bachelor's degree.

International Military Education and Training funds from the United States are important to Botswana's officer training programme. Over 50 Botswana officers receive military training in the US each year; by 1999 approximately 85% of the BDF officers are said to have been trained through this arrangement.

=== Training institutions ===
The training institutions in the BDF include among others Military College, Defence Command and Staff College (DCSC), Flying Training School (FTE), Technical Training School (TTS), Peace Support Training Centre (PSTC), All Arms Battle School and the Joint Technical Training School (JTTS).

== BDF Air Arm Command ==
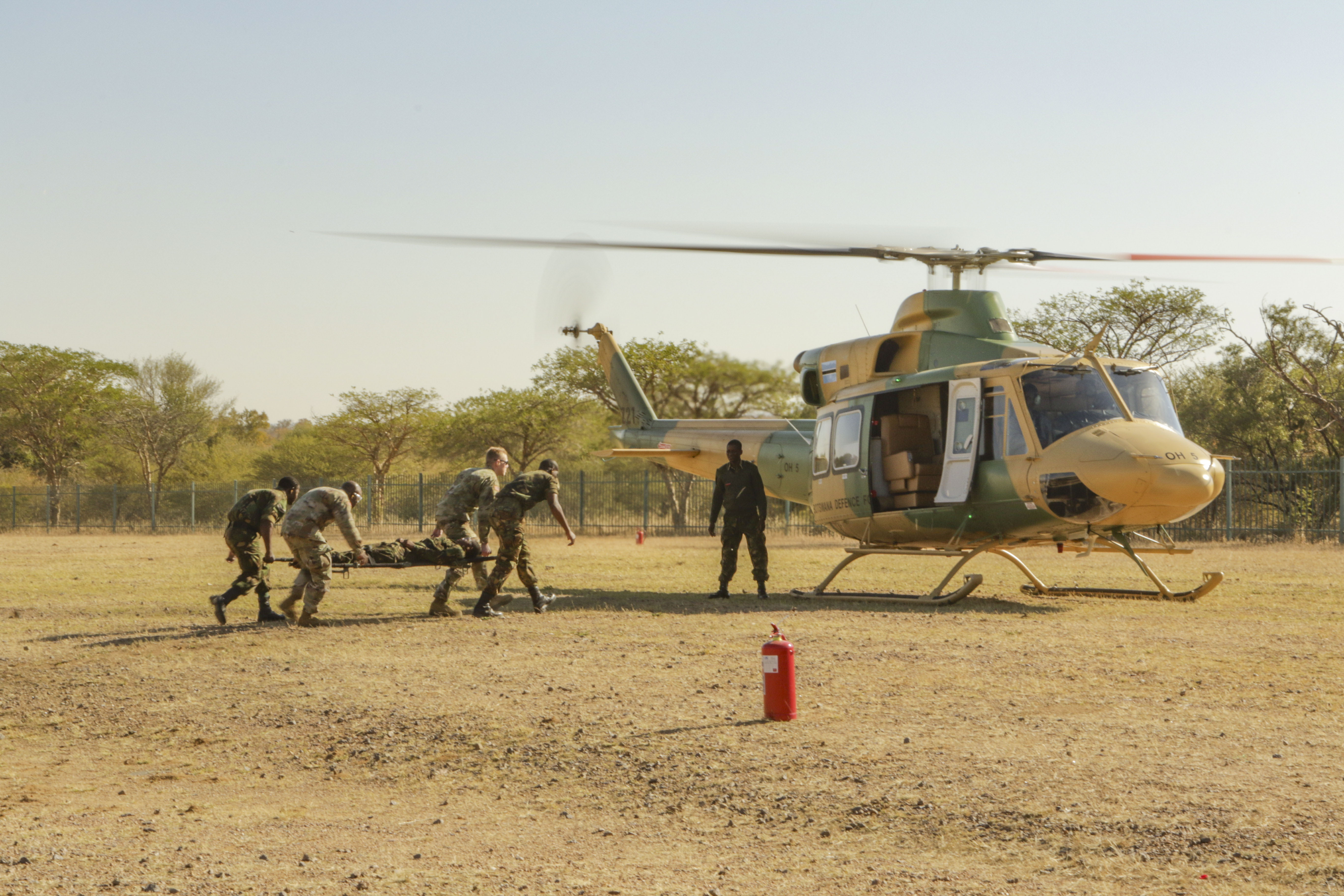
U.S. military & BDF personnel load a patient onto a Bell 412 during a joint exercise

The Air Army Command was formed in 1977 and is organisationally part of the Botswana Defence Force. All squadrons are designated with a Z, which is used as a designation for "squadron". The main base is near Molepolole and was built by mostly foreign contractors between 1992 and 1996. The base is a multi-stage project that included runways, taxiways, extensive shelter and ordnance storage facilities, a headquarters facility and a large complex of living quarters and support buildings. Sometimes referred to as the "Eagle" project, the base has received continual improvements since its inception. Other airports used are Sir Seretse Khama International Airport at Gaborone and Francistown International Airport in Francistown.

The backbone of the Air Arm Command consists of a squadron of former Canadian CF-116s which are locally designated as BF-5s. Thirteen ex-Canadian CF-116s (ten single-seater CF-5As and three trainer CF-5Bs) were ordered in 1996 to replace the Strikemasters, with another three single-seaters and two dual-seaters delivered in 2000. (Note: Only 14 CF-5s (both single- and dual-seat versions) remain in service in 2009.) For transport, the Air Arm Command uses Britten-Norman Defenders, CASA C-212 Aviocars, CASA CN-235s and C-130B Hercules. The latest addition to the transport fleet was an ex-AMARC C-130 Hercules to complement the two existing aircraft. A combination of Bell 412EP and 412SP helicopters are operated by Z21 and perform a variety of functions; search and rescue, medevac, anti-poaching and troop & VIP transport.

== Gallery ==
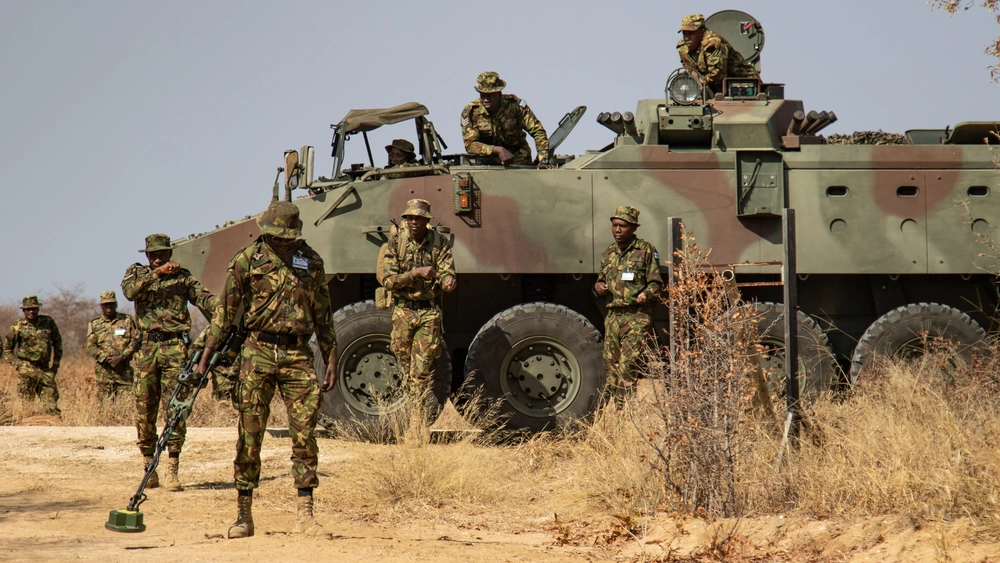
BDF Ground Forces partaking in a mine clearing exercise

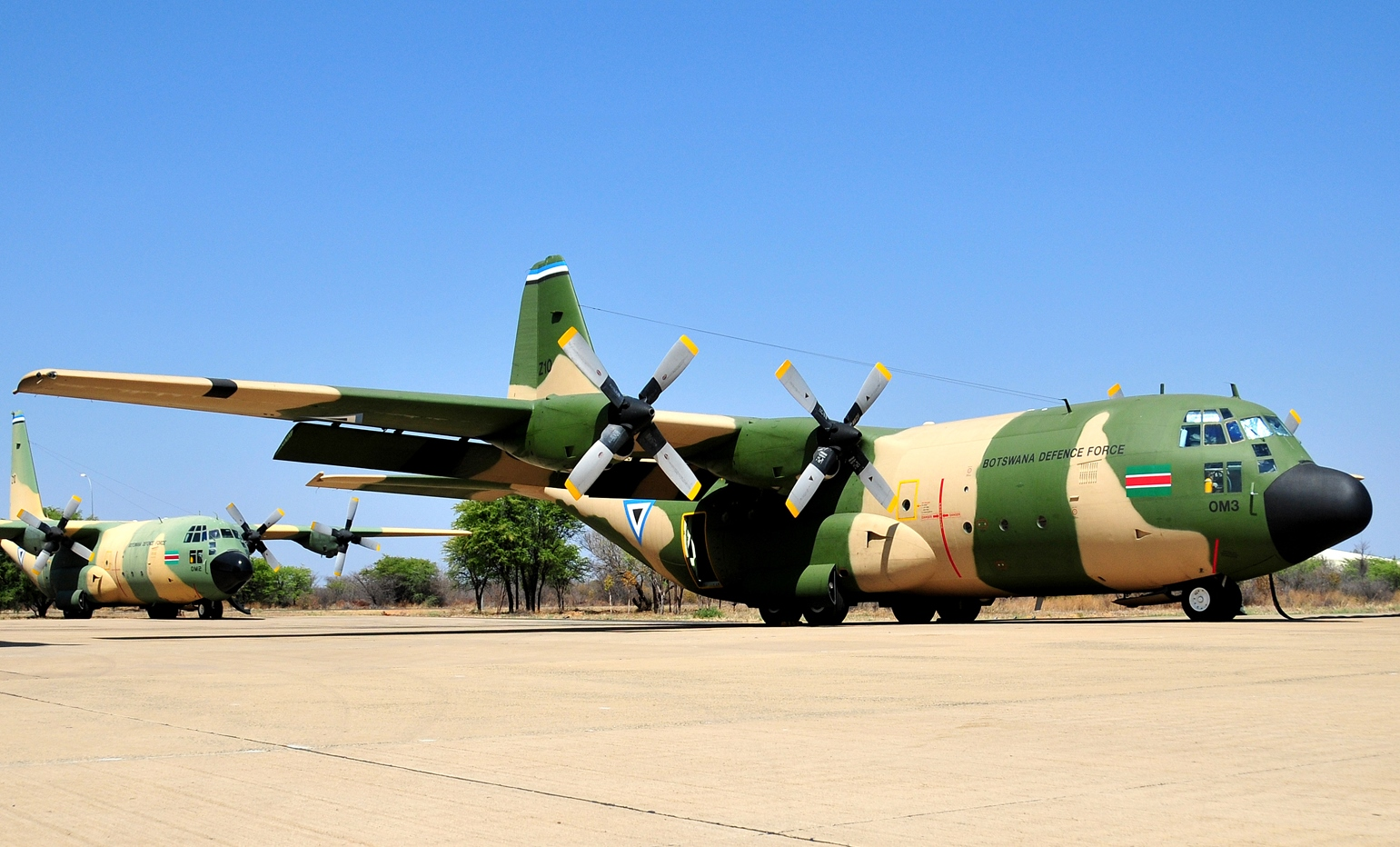
BDF Air Wing Lockheed C-130 Hercules Tactical airlifter

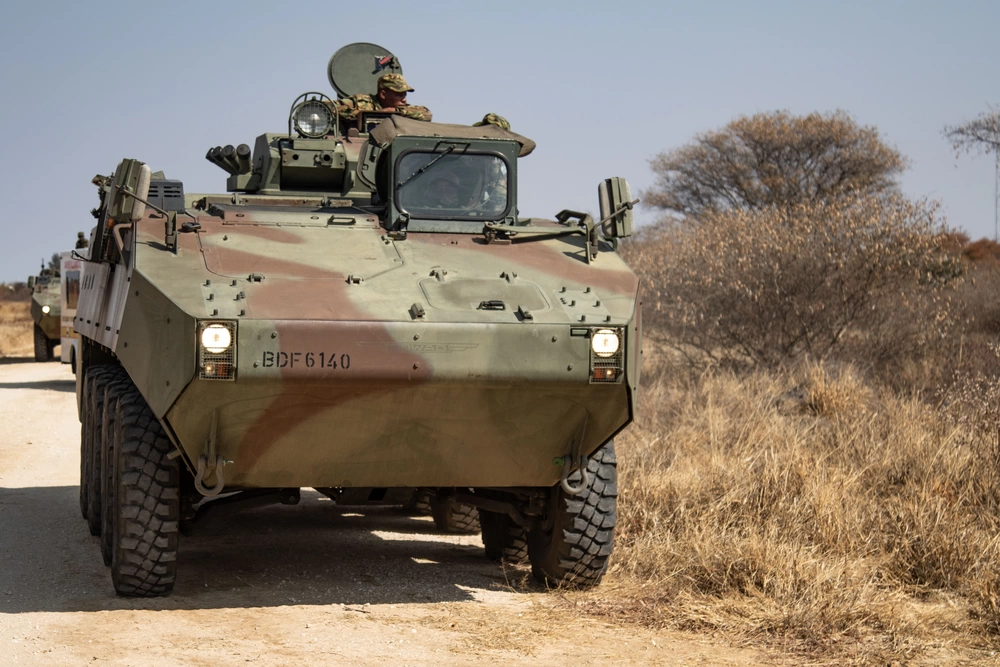
Botswana Ground Forces Mowag Piranha IIIC APC

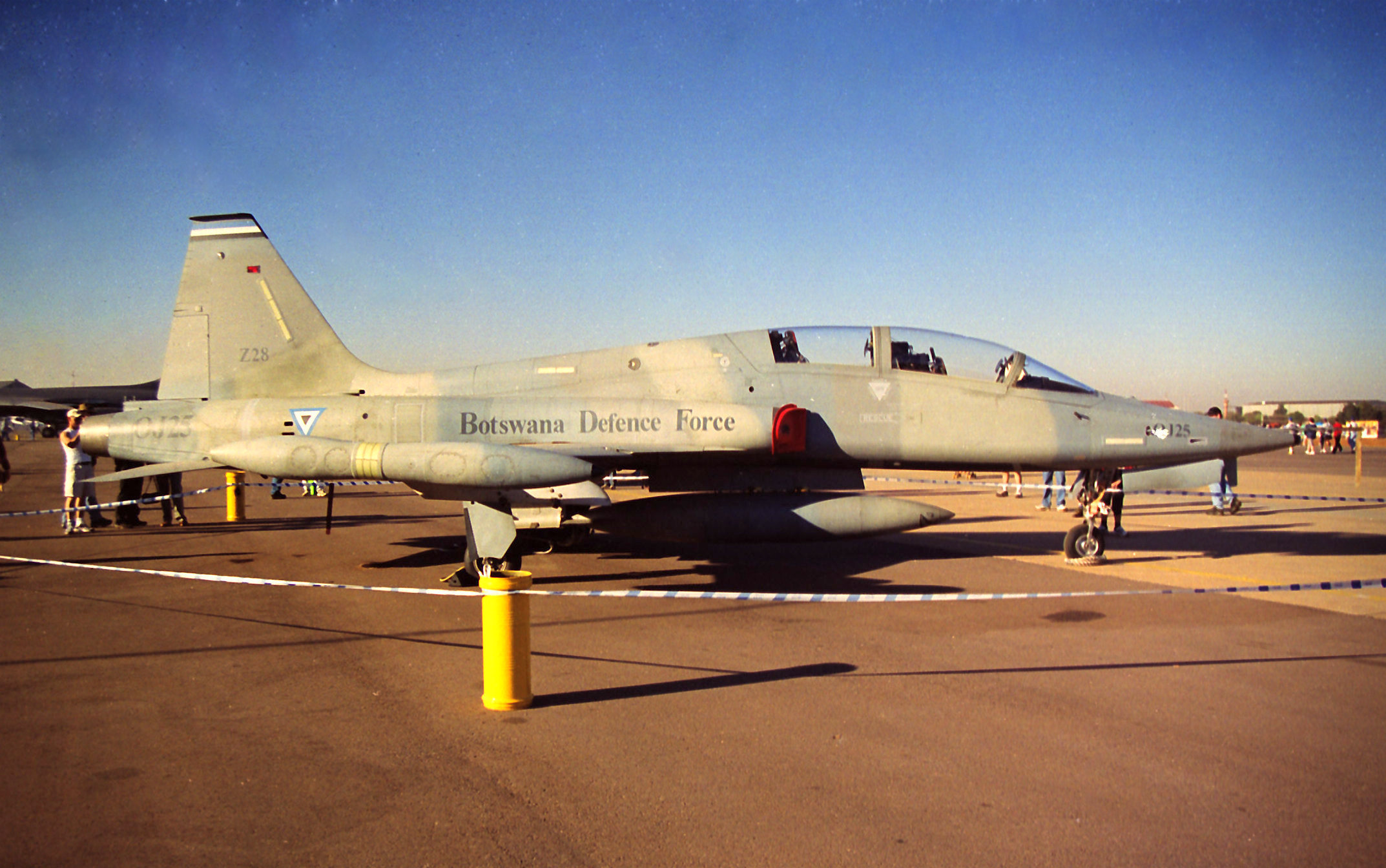
BDF Air Wing Canadair CF-5 Fighter-bomber

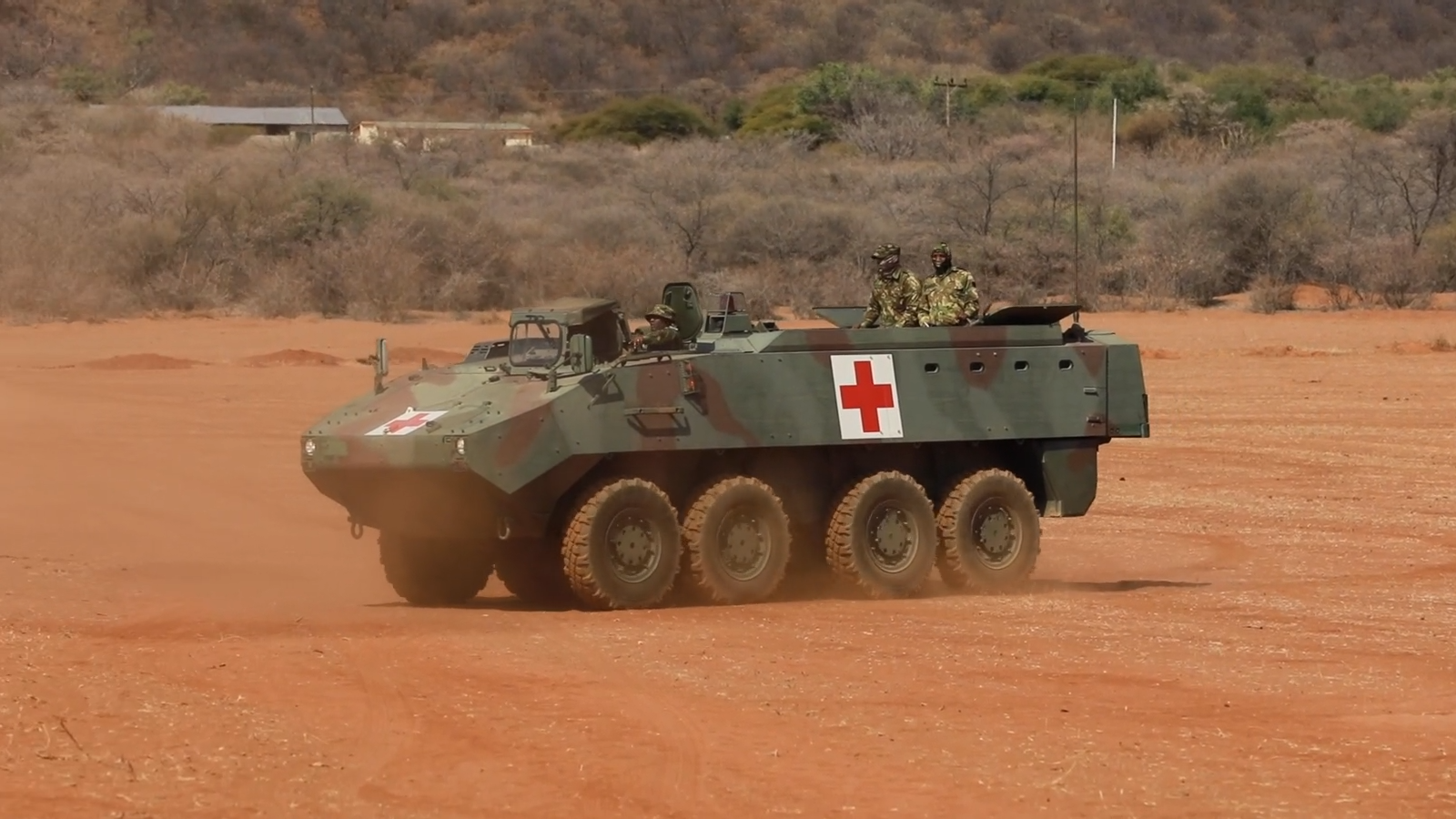
BDF's Mowag Piranha Ambulance

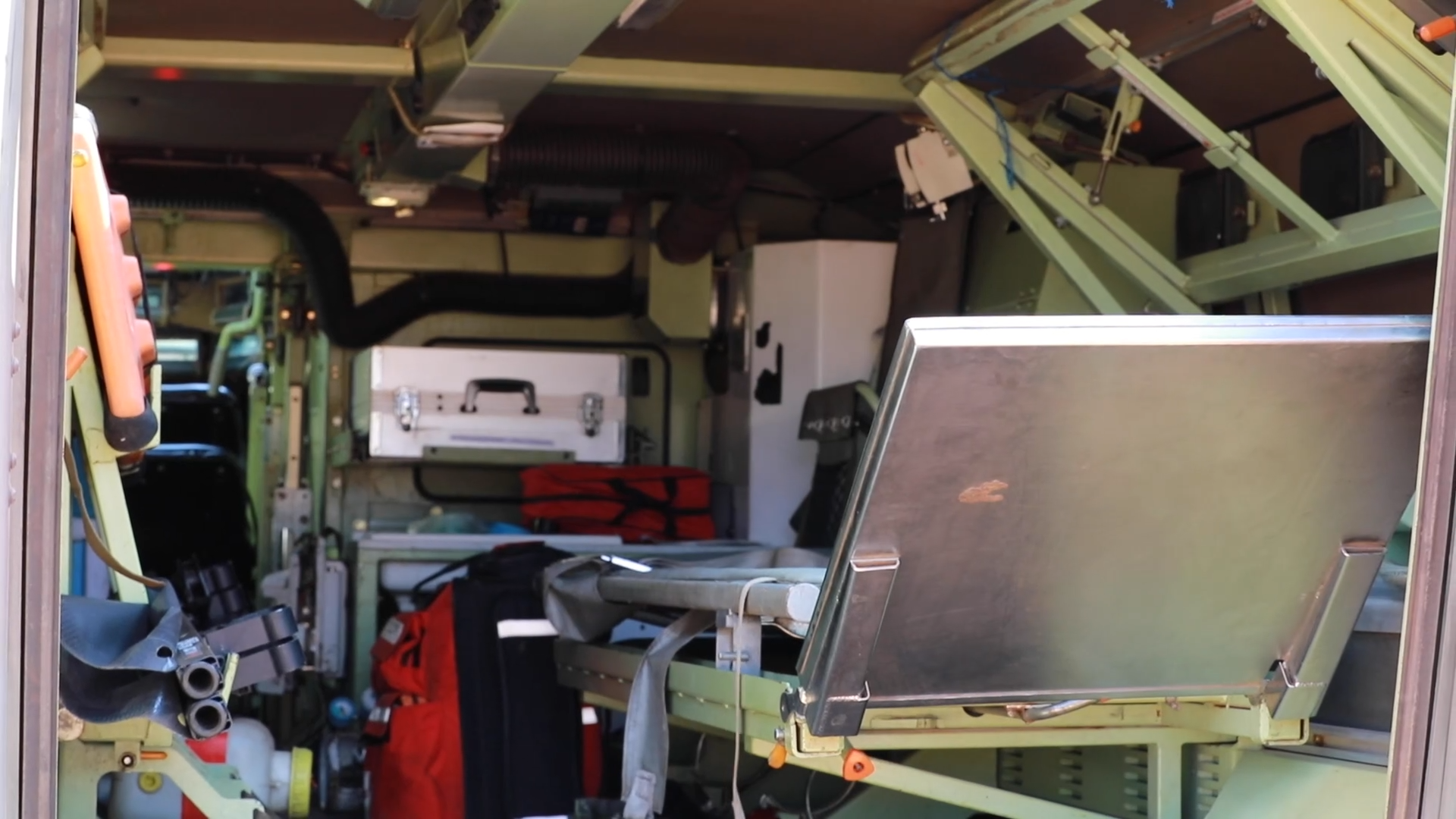
Inside BDF's Mowag Piranha Ambulance

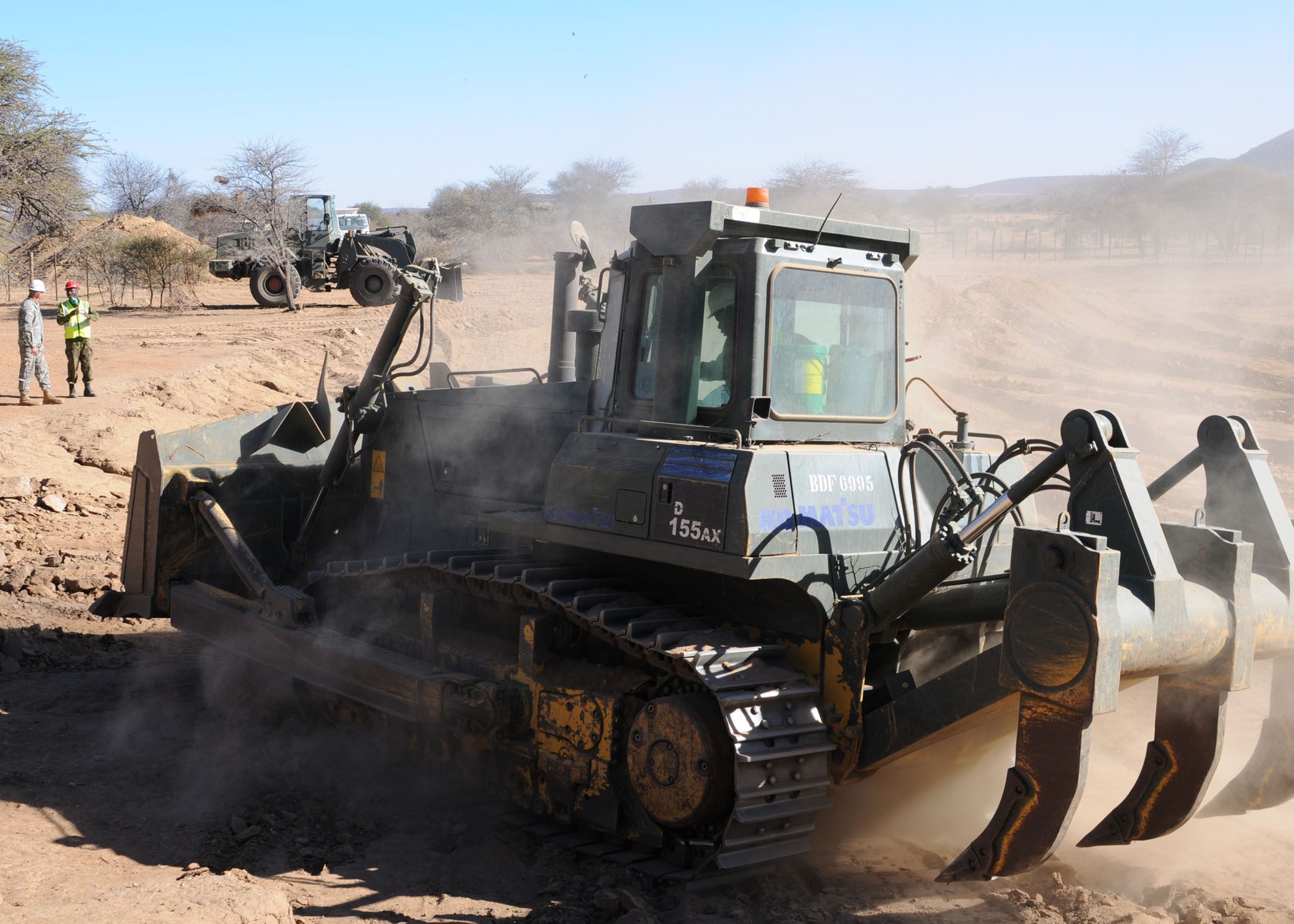
BDF's Ground Forces engineering corps

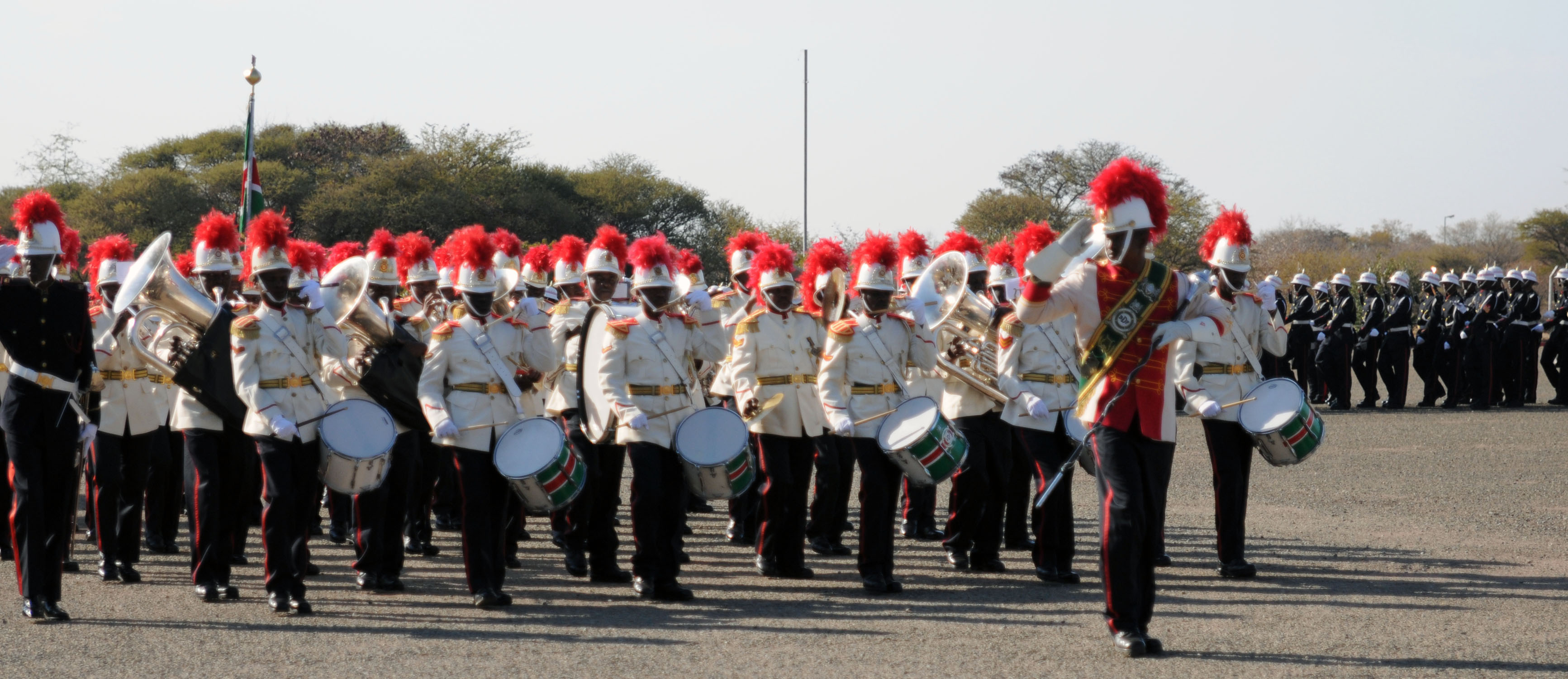
Botswana Defence Force Band

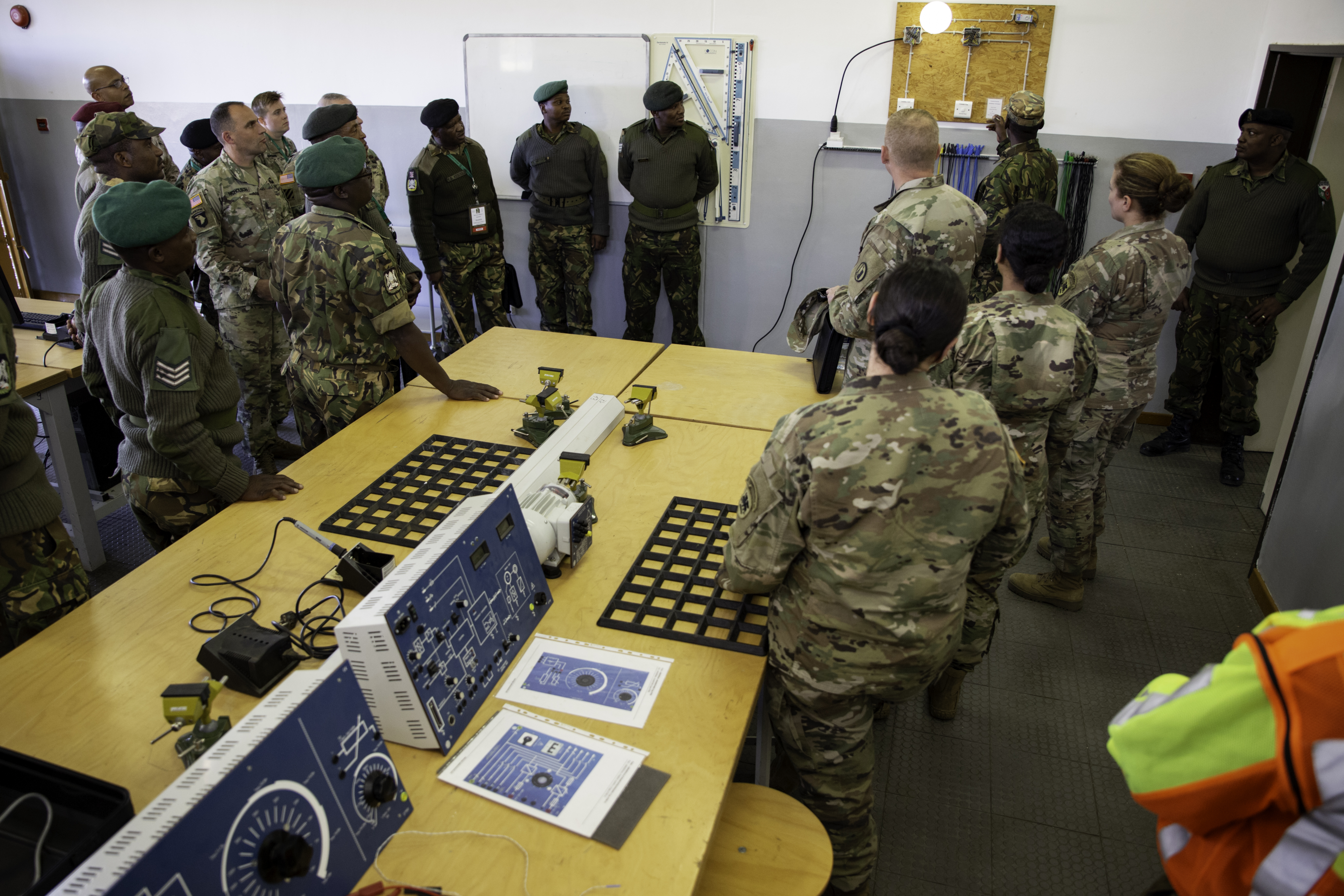
The BDF Command and Staff College classroom

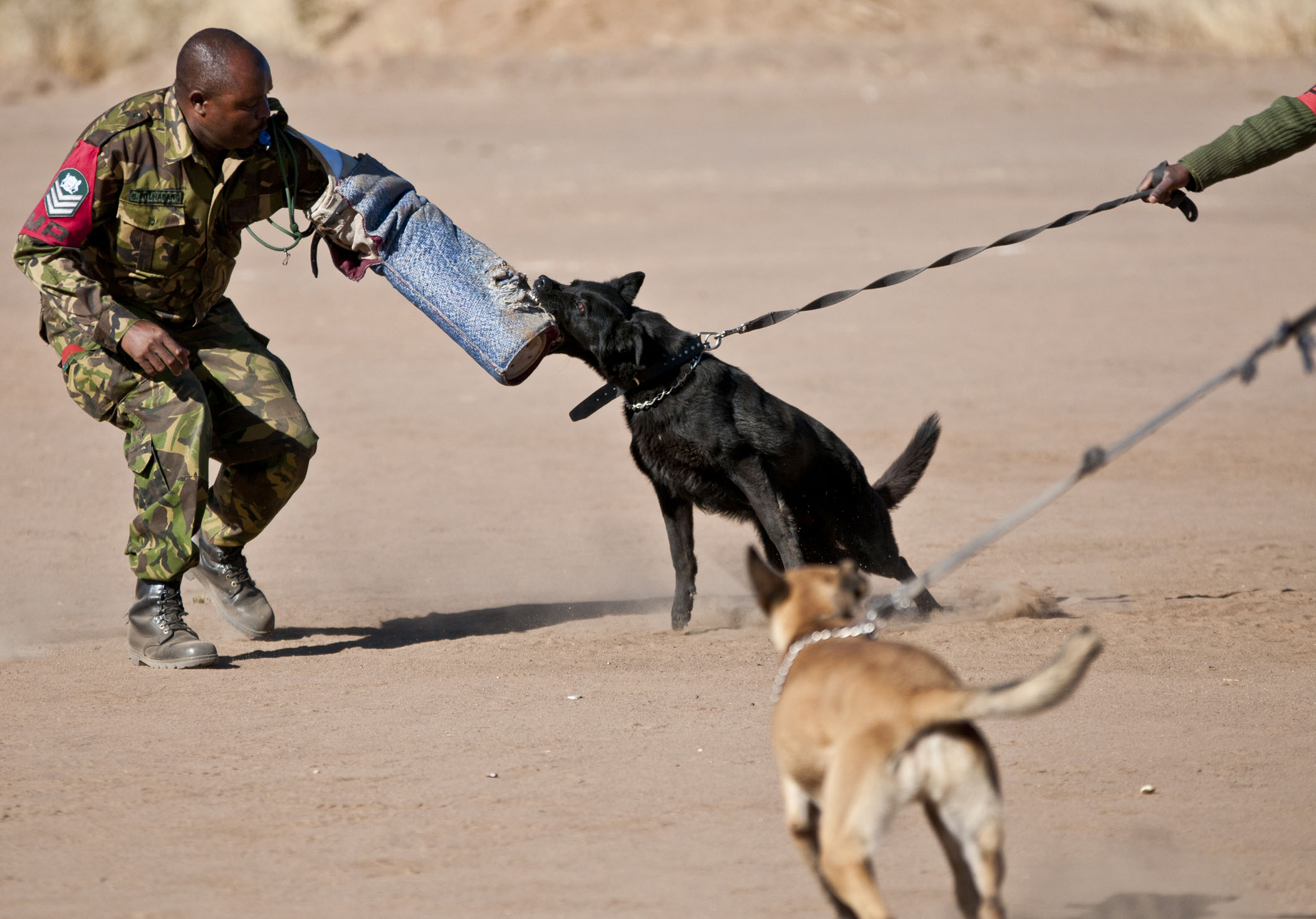
BDF Military Police K-9 Unit training

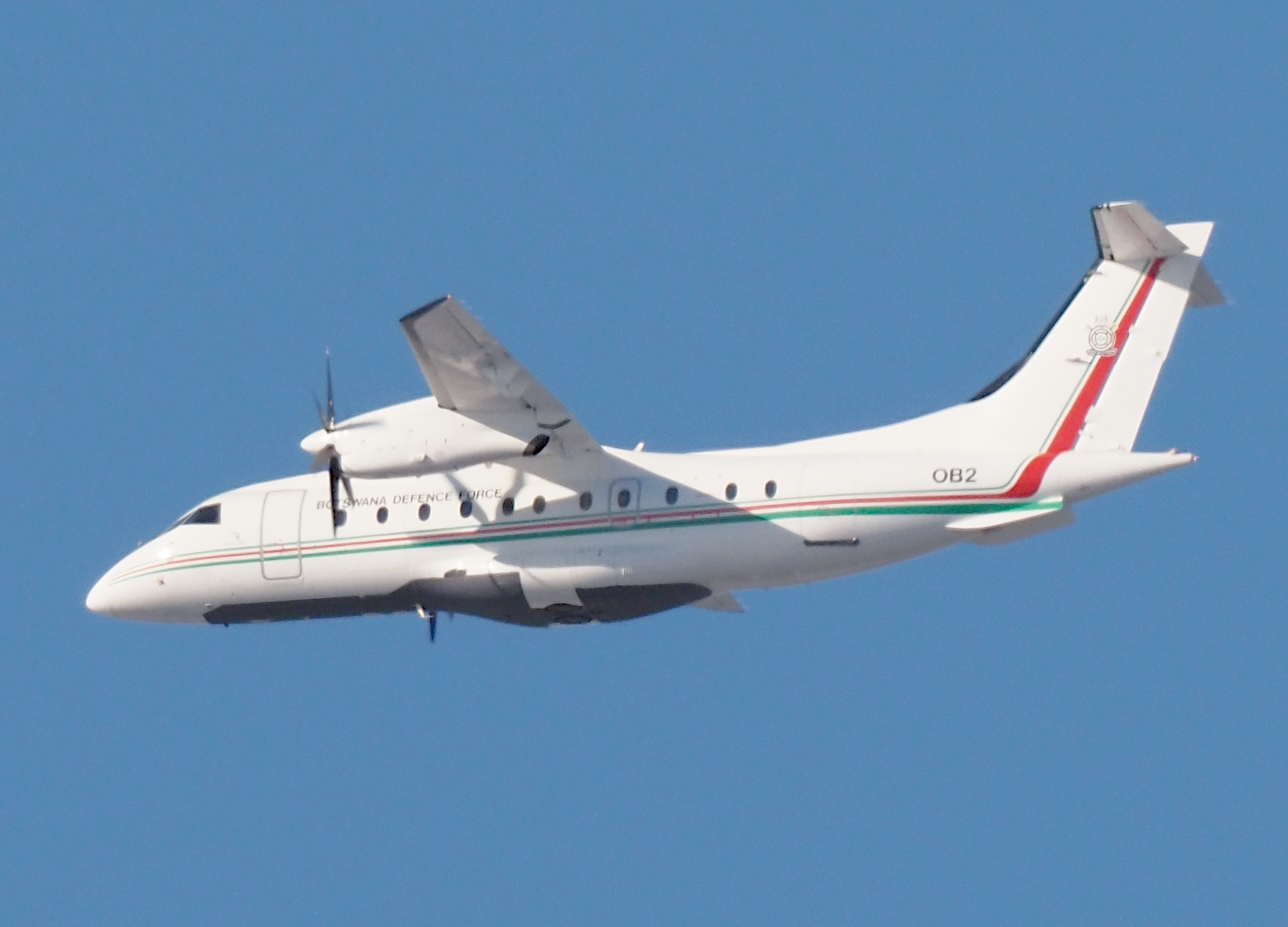
Dornier 328 Transporter

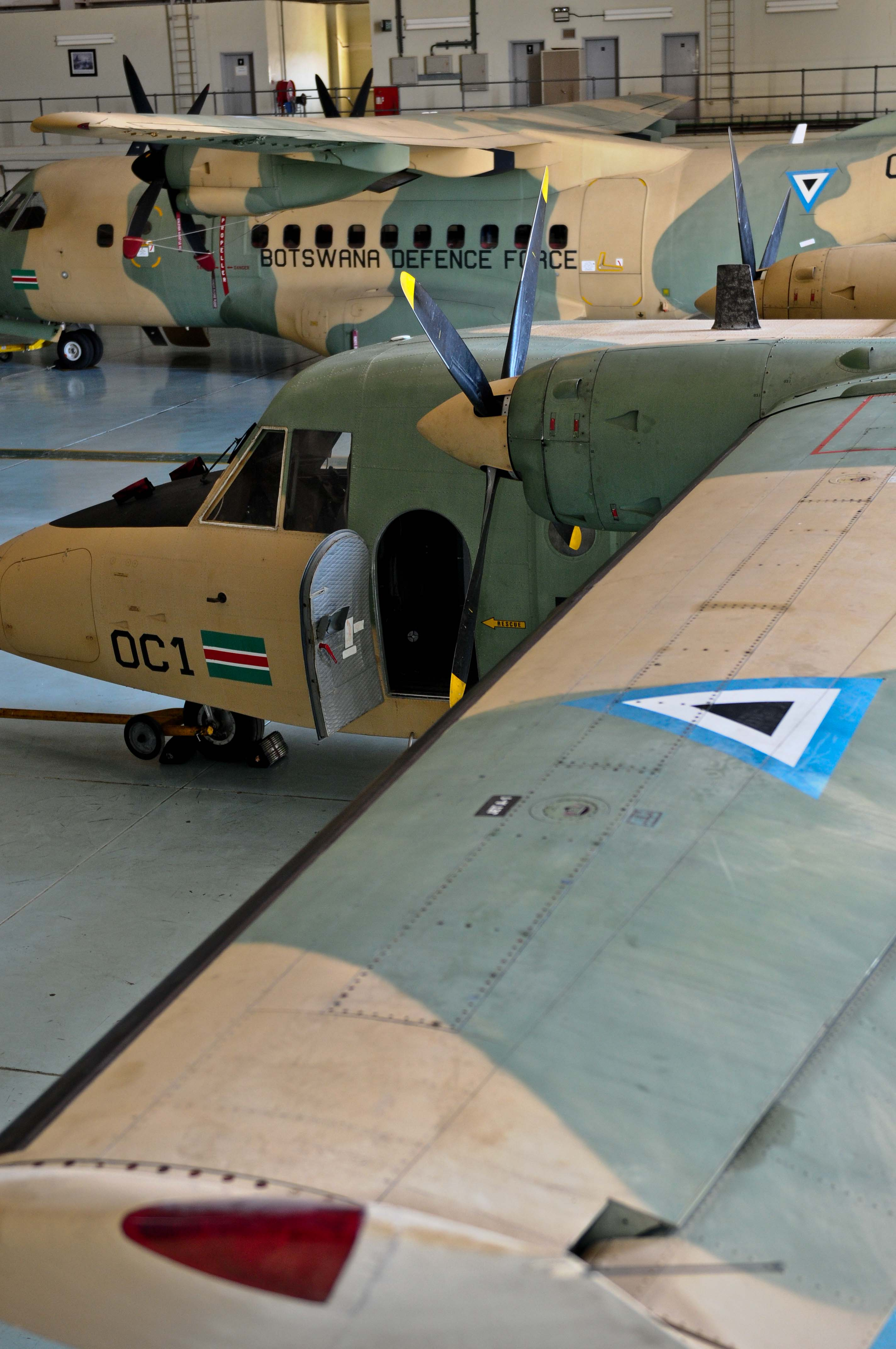
CASA C-212 & CASA CN 235 light aircraft transports

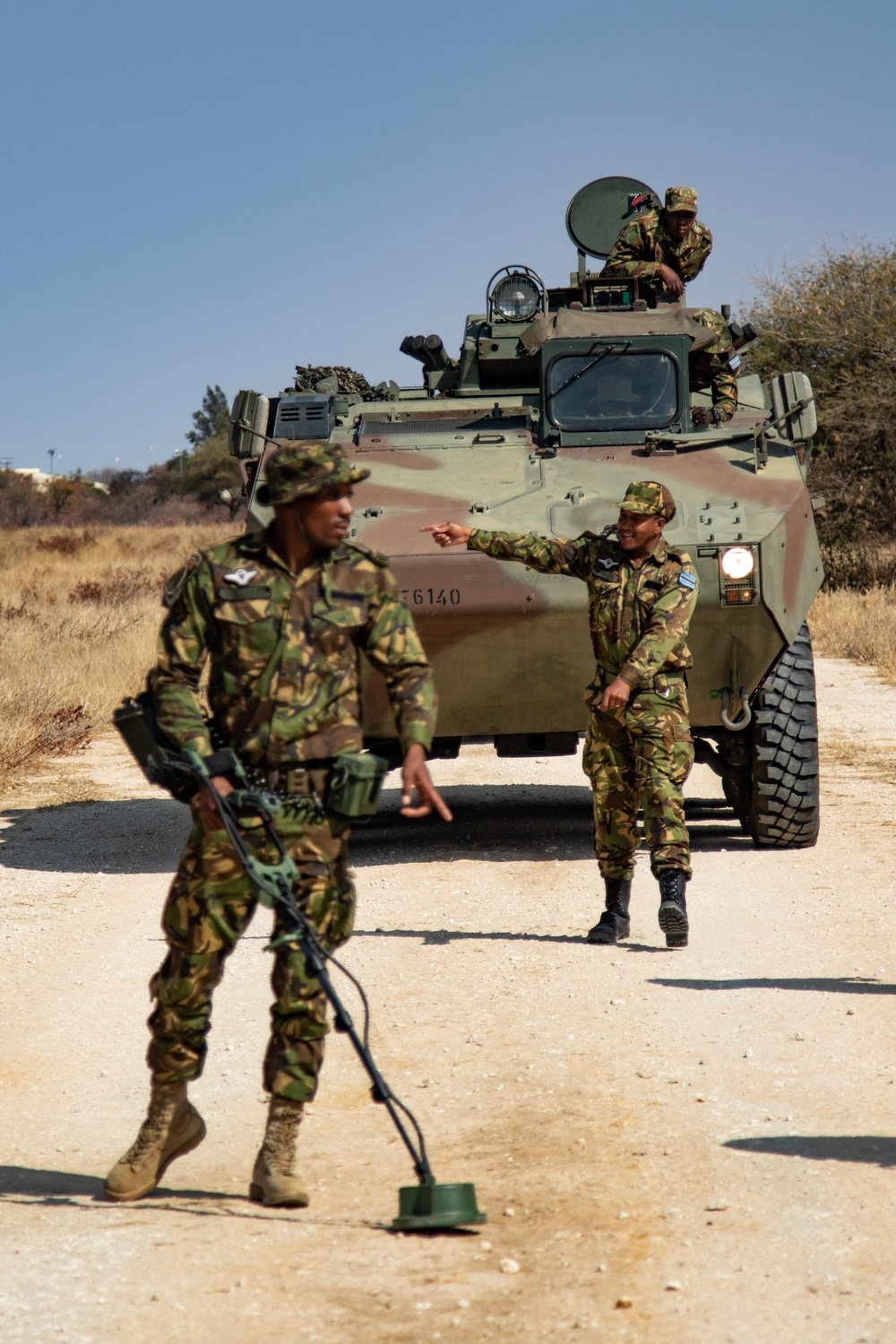
BDF Ground Forces

== See also ==
- List of equipment of the Botswana Ground Force
- Botswana Defence Force XI
