= Brigadier =

Military rank

Brigadier (/ˌbrɪɡəˈdɪər/ BRIG-ə-DEER) is a military rank, the seniority of which depends on the country. In some countries, it is a senior rank above colonel, equivalent to a brigadier general or commodore, typically commanding a brigade of several thousand soldiers. In other countries, it is a non-commissioned rank.

== Origins and history ==
The word and rank of "Brigadier" originates from France. In the French Army, the Brigadier des Armées du Roi (Brigadier of the King's Armies) was a general officer rank, created in 1657. It was an intermediate between the rank of Mestre de camp and that of Maréchal de camp.

The rank was first created in the cavalry at the instigation of Marshal Turenne on June 8, 1657, then in the infantry on March 17, 1668, and in the dragoons on April 15, 1672. In peacetime, the brigadier commanded his regiment and, in maneuvers or in wartime, he commanded two or three - or even four - regiments combined to form a brigade (including his own, but later the rank was also awarded to lieutenant-colonels, which allowed for the promotion of an officer who did not have his own regiment).

Before the rank of brigadier of the armies was dissolved in 1788, it was materialized by the wearing of a single star. And when it was abolished that year, the number of stars of its immediate superiors was not modified, which explains why today French generals have one more star on their insignia than their foreign counterparts (notably American).

Note that the rank of "Chef de brigade" created during the French Revolution replaced that of Colonel. A brigade commander then commanded... a half-brigade (a name that replaced the regiment).

The rank of Brigadier of the Armies reappeared during the Third Republic. It designates a colonel, experienced as a regimental commander, who has under his command several regiments without having the annexed units that would make this group a brigade. The army brigadier wears the colonel's uniform and insignia. The rank was definitively abolished in 1945.

Until 1788, a rank of brigadier des armées ("brigadier of the armies"), which could be described as a senior colonel or junior brigade commander, was used in the French Army. The normal brigade command rank was field marshal (maréchal de camp) (which elsewhere is a more senior rank). During the French Revolution, the ranks of brigadier des armées and maréchal de camp were replaced by brigade general (général de brigade).

In common with many countries, France now uses the officer rank of brigade general (Général de brigade) instead of a "brigadier" rank. The brigadier des armées held a one-star insignia, while the général de brigade inherited the maréchal de camp two-stars insignia. The disappearance of the brigadier rank is the reason that there is no one-star insignia in the French Army.

The rank of brigadier is still nonetheless used in some regiments as an equivalent of corporal. By extension, this also applies to the gendarmerie, equivalent in rank to a corporal in the infantry.

== NATO code ==
While the rank is used in a number of NATO countries, it is ranked differently depending on the country.

NATO code	Country	English equivalent	
NATO code	Country	UK	US
Officers
OF-6	Norway, Slovenia	Brigadier	Brigadier general
OF-5	Croatia	Colonel	
Other ranks
OR-8	Spain	Warrant officer class 2	Master sergeant
OR-3	France	Lance corporal	Private first class

== General officer rank ==
=== Gallery ===
Brigadeiro
(Angolan Army)

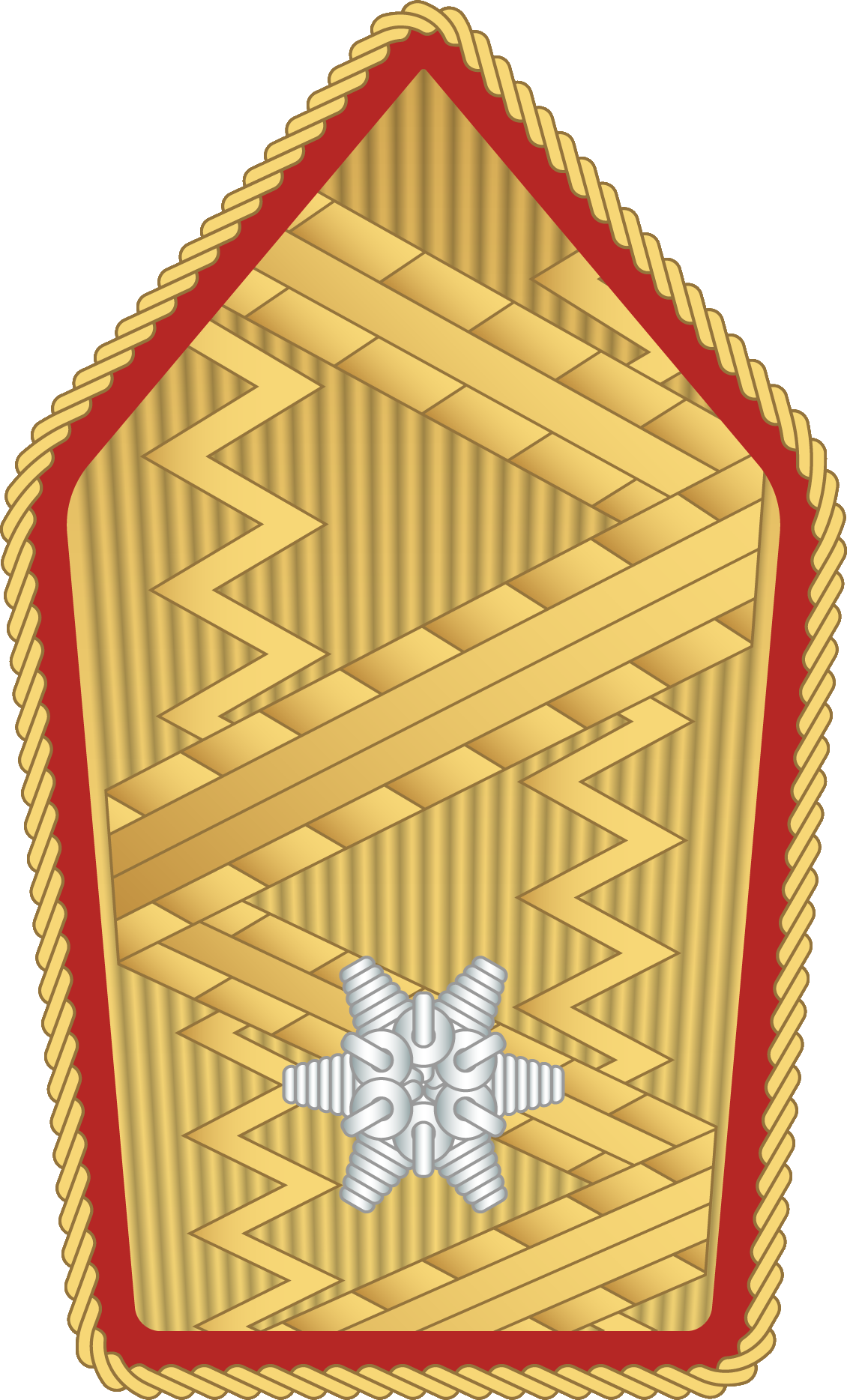
Brigadier
(Austrian Land Forces)

Brigadeiro
(Cape Verdean National Guard)

Brigadeiro
(Army of São Tomé and Príncipe)

Brigadir
(Slovenian Ground Force)

Brigadier
(Swiss Army)

== Senior officer rank ==
=== British tradition ===
In many countries, especially those formerly part of the British Empire, a brigadier is either the highest field rank or most junior general appointment, nominally commanding a brigade. It ranks above colonel and below major general.

The rank is used by the British Army, the Royal Marines, the Australian Army, the Bangladesh Army, the Indian Army, the Sri Lankan Army, the New Zealand Army, the Pakistan Army and several others. Although it is not always considered a general officer rank, it is always considered equivalent to the brigadier general and brigade general rank of other countries. In NATO forces, brigadier is OF-6 on the rank scale.

"The grade of brigadier-general, also called, almost interchangeably, brigadier, first appeared in the British army during the reign of King James II. A warrant of 1705 placed the grade directly below major-general, but the appointment was always considered temporary and not continuous. The British were ambiguous over whether the holder was considered a general officer or a senior field grade office".

The title is derived from the equivalent British rank of brigadier-general, used until 1922 and still used in many countries. "Brigadier" was already in use as a generic term for a commander of a brigade irrespective of specific rank. Until the rank was dissolved in 1922, brigadier-generals wore a crossed sword and baton symbol on its own.

From 1922 to 1928, the British rank title used was that of colonel-commandant, with one crown and three 'pips', a rank which, although reflecting its modern role in the British Army as a senior colonel rather than a junior general, was not well received and was replaced with brigadier after six years. Colonel-commandant was only ever used for officers commanding brigades, depots or training establishments. Officers holding equivalent rank in administrative appointments were known as "colonels on the staff", also replaced by brigadier in 1928. Colonel-commandants and colonels on the staff wore the same rank badge later adopted by brigadiers.

Until shortly after World War II, brigadier was an appointment conferred on colonels (as commodore was an appointment conferred on naval captains) rather than a substantive rank.

In Commonwealth countries, and most Arabic-speaking countries (in which the rank is called عميد, ʿamīd), the rank insignia comprises a crown (or some other national symbol) with three stars (Note: In Britain, Australia, and many other Commonwealth and ex-Commonwealth countries, these are Order of the Bath stars.) (sometimes called "pips") which are often arranged in a triangle. A brigadier's uniform may also have red gorget patches. It is otherwise similar to that of a colonel (a colonel's rank insignia having a crown/emblem with two stars or "pips".)

The Canadian Army used the rank of brigadier (following British tradition, with identical insignia) until the unification of the Canadian Forces in 1968. The rank then became brigadier-general with the insignia of St. Edward's Crown surmounting a crossed sword and baton over one gold maple leaf.

=== Spain ===
The rank of a brigadier was established by Philip V in 1702 as an intermediate rank between colonel and true generals. In some Iberoamerican republics (see below), the rank survived after independence. In Spain, brigadiers came to be considered full generals in 1871, and in 1889 they were renamed general de brigada. The historical rank is distinct from the current NCO rank of brigada, although sometimes translators confuse the two. The name has survived as a cadet rank at the Spanish Naval Academy.

=== Latin America ===
Many countries in South and Central America were formerly Spanish or Portuguese (Brazil) possessions. Brigadier [-general] is used in Latin America, in the normal sense of brigade commander rank (e.g. Colombia, Chile), although most Latin American nations instead use the rank of brigade general. In Mexico, brigadier general is the rank below brigade general, both ranks falling between colonel and divisional general.

However, both the Argentine and Brazilian Air Forces use a curious system of variations on brigadier for all (Argentina) or most (Brazil) general officers. The origin of this system is not entirely clear, but in the case of Argentina may be due to army air units being commanded by brigade generals before the establishment of the Air Force as an independent armed force.

=== Gallery ===
Brigadier
(Australian Army)

Brigadir
(Bosnian Ground Forces)

Brigadier
(Botswana Ground Force)

Brigadier
(Chilean Army)

Brigadier
(Fiji Infantry Regiment)

Brigadier
(Guyana Army)

Brigadier
(Hindi: ब्रिगेडियर)
(Indian Army)

Brigadier
(Jamaican Army)

Brigadier
(Kenya Army)

Brigadier
(Malawi Army)

Brigadier
(Maltese: Brigadier)
(Army of Malta)

Brigadier
(New Zealand Army)

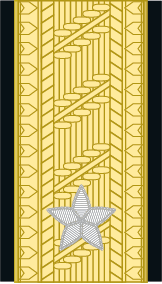
Brigader
(Norwegian Army and Royal Norwegian Air Force)

Brigadier
(Urdu: بریگیڈیئر)
(Pakistan Army)

Brigadier
(Papua New Guinea Land Element)

Brigadier
(Seychelles Infantry Unit)

Brigadier
(Sierra Leone Army)

Brigadier
(Sri Lanka Army)

Brigadier
(Tongan Land Component)

Brigadier
(Eswatini Army)

Brigadier
(Ugandan Land Forces)

Brigadier
(British Army)

Brigadier
(Royal Marines)

Brigadier
(Zimbabwe National Army)

== Junior officer rank ==
=== United Kingdom ===
In the UK, brigadier and sub-brigadier were formerly subaltern ranks in the Royal Horse Guards.

== Non-commissioned rank ==
Brigadier also exists as a non-commissioned rank. This usage derives from the use of "brigade" to denote a squad or team, similar to the occasional English civilian usage "work brigade".

=== France ===
==== Military ====
In France, and some countries whose forces were structured based on the method used in France, some branches of the army and the gendarmerie use brigadier for a rank equivalent to caporal (corporal), and brigadier-chef for a rank equivalent to caporal-chef. Brigadier is used by arms of the army that are by tradition considered "mounted" arms, such as logistics or cavalry units. A similar usage exists elsewhere.

In the French gendarmerie, the brigadier ranks are used as in the army, i.e. as junior enlisted ranks (gradés), while the French police use brigadier ranks as their sub-officer (sous-officier) ranks. Since all professional police and gendarmes have sub-officer status in France, the gendarmerie brigadier ranks are rarely used, since they are used only by auxiliaries. On the other hand, the police brigadier ranks, which are used to indicate professional ranks, are common.

In the French gendarmerie and in "mounted" arms of the French army, the brigadier ranks are:

	OR-4		OR-3	
	Army	Gendarmerie	Army	Gendarmerie
Shoulder				
Camouflage				
French	Brigadier-chef		Brigadier	
English translation	Chief brigadier		Brigadier	

==== National police ====
In the French National Police, the sub-officer variations are used for non-commissioned officers are:

- Sous-brigadier (OR-6, equal to gendarmerie maréchal-des-logis-chef)
- Brigadier (OR-8, equal to gendarmerie adjudant)
- Brigadier-chef (OR-9, equal to gendarmerie adjudant-chef)
- Brigadier-major (OR-9, equal to gendarmerie major)

=== Indonesia ===
In the Indonesian National Police force, this rank is referred to as the Constable ranks in the regular police units. It is equivalent to the "sergeant" rank in the armed forces. This rank is the most junior rank in the regular police units of Indonesia but is above the enlisted ranks (Tamtama) of the special police units such as in the Mobile Brigade corps and water police units. This rank is below the "Sub-inspector" (Ajun Inspektur Polisi) ranks. The police Brigadier ranks are as shown below:

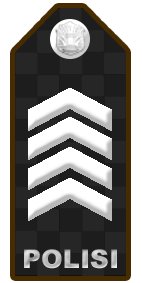
- Brigadir Polisi Kepala, abbreviated Bripka (Police Chief Brigadier)
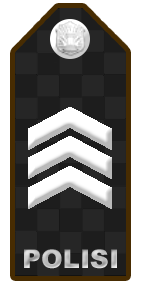
- Brigadir Polisi, not abbreviated (Police Brigadier)
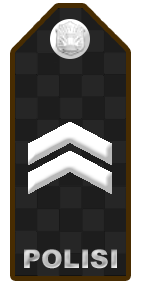
- Brigadir Polisi Satu, abbreviated Briptu (Police Brigadier 1st class)
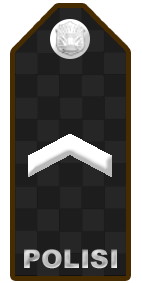
- Brigadir Polisi Dua, abbreviated Bripda (Police Brigadier 2nd class)

In addition, Police Brigadier General (Brigadir Jenderal Polisi) and Brigadier General (Brigadir Jenderal) are general officer ranks in the Indonesian Police, Army and Marine Corps respectively.

=== Italy ===
In the Italian Carabinieri and Guardia di Finanza, the ranks of vice-brigadier (vice brigadiere), brigadier (brigadiere), and chief brigadier (brigadiere capo) correspond roughly to the army ranks based on sergeant. The rank of brigade general (generale di brigata) is used throughout the armed forces as the most junior general rank, and corresponds to the British rank title of brigadier.

=== Netherlands ===
Brigadier is traditionally the most senior non-commissioned rank in the Dutch police, for example the National Police Corps (Korps Nationale Politie). Its predecessors also used this rank. The Royal Marechaussee (military police/gendarmerie) does not use this rank.

=== Spain ===
In Spain, a brigada has a NATO rank code of OR-8 (and is thus a senior NCO). The Spanish rank brigada is distinct from the Spanish-language brigadier [-general] used for senior officers in Latin America (and historically in Spain).

=== Gallery ===
Brigadier
(Burkina Faso Ground Forces)

Brigada
(Army of Equatorial Guinea)

Brigadier
(French Army)

Brigadier
(Army of Monaco)

Brigada
(Spanish Army)

== See also ==
- List of comparative military ranks
