= Botswana Ground Force =

Ground Forces Command
- Founded: 1977
- Country: Botswana
- Type: Army
- Size: 8,500
- Part of: Botswana Defence Force
- Website: www.online.bdf.org.bw

Commanders
- Commander-in-Chief: President Duma Boko
- Commander: Lieutenant General Placid Diratsagae Segokgo (DCO, PJM, DSM)
- Deputy Commander: Major General Joseph Eno Seelo (DCO, PJM, UNOSOM, DSM, psc)

The Botswana Ground Forces is the army of the country of Botswana, and the land component of the Botswana Defence Force.

== History ==
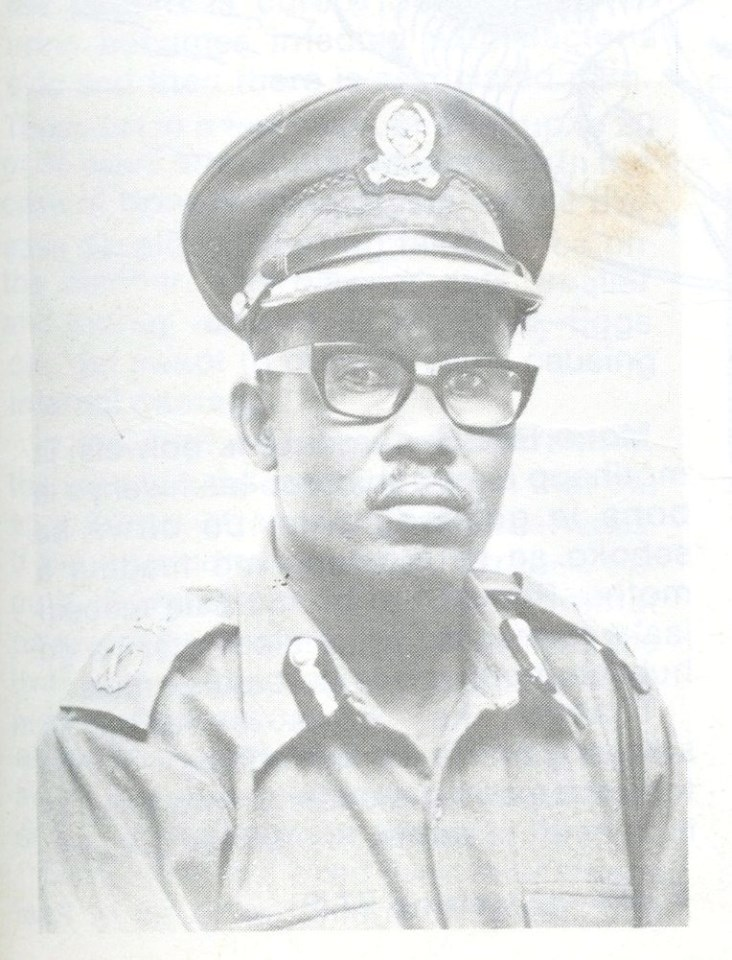
General Mompati Merafhe, founding commander of BDF

The Botswana Defence Force was raised in April 1977 by an Act of Parliament called the 'BDF Act NO 13 of 1977. At its formation, Lieutenant General Mompati Merafhe (retired and former Vice President of the Republic of Botswana (now deceased)) became its first Commander. The former President of the Republic of Botswana, Lieutenant General Seretse Khama Ian Khama, then Brigadier, was the Deputy Commander. Unusually for an African military force, and chiefly attributable to its being founded after Botswana's independence, the Botswana Ground Force was not formed from colonial units formed by a colonising power, but rather were formed from the remains of the Botswana Mounted Police Unit, previously known as the Bechuanaland Mounted Police, a unit of the British South Africa Police.

The contemporary roles of the Defence Force are broad for a conventional military, suggesting that the government of Botswana and the BDF subscribe to a wide view of ‘security’ and consider the Defence Force an appropriate agency for attaining much of it, an issue that has been discussed even in the BDF's own internal media. It is expected that the BDF in general is meant to be an apolitical instrument of the state.

The current stated mission of the Botswana Ground Force is:
To defend the country and provide for the security of Botswana, participate in external security cooperation activities, and contribute in domestic support operations, with the aim of:

- Ensuring national security and stability
- Protecting the people and their properties
- Protecting the constitution of Botswana to guarantee the rule of law
- Defending Botswana's territorial integrity on land and in the air
- Preserving Botswana as a free, independent and sovereign state
- Aiding civil authorities in domestic support operations
- Strengthening Botswana's international relations by participating in regional and international security cooperation activities

== Structure and organisation ==
The commander-in-chief of the BDF is Duma Boko, the current President of Botswana. Answering to him is Lieutenant General Placid Segokgo.

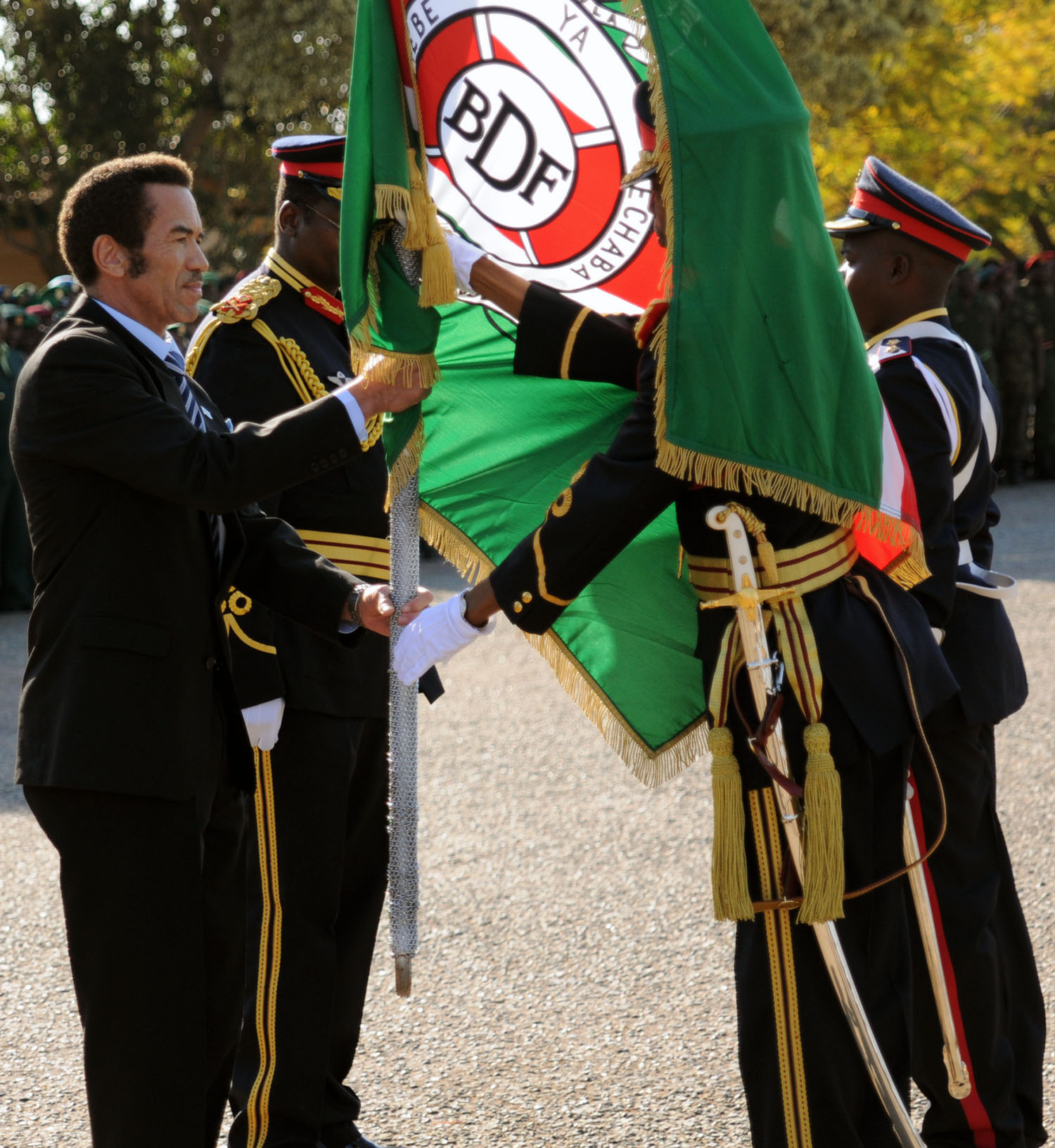
2012 Botswana Defence Force Change of Command

The various units of the Botswana Ground Force are as follows:

- 1st Armoured Brigade (Gaborone)
- 1st Infantry Brigade (mechanised brigade at Gaborone)
- 2nd Infantry Brigade (motorized brigade at Francistown)
- 3rd Infantry Brigade (motorized brigade at Ghanzi)
- 1st Commando Regiment (Gaborone)
- Four independent infantry battalions
- Two armored-artillery brigades
- One combat engineering regiment
- 1 air defense battalion
- Army river-wing (including diving unit)

== Ranks and insignia ==
The BGF and the Botswana Air Force maintain the same rank system, which is loosely based on British or Commonwealth rank systems. The ranks are as follows:

Commissioned officer ranks

The rank insignia of commissioned officers.

Rank group	General / flag officers			Senior officers			Junior officers
Botswana Ground Force
Botswana Ground Force	Lieutenant general	Major general	Brigadier	Colonel	Lieutenant colonel	Major	Captain	First lieutenant	Second lieutenant

Other ranks

The rank insignia of non-commissioned officers and enlisted personnel.

Rank group	Senior NCOs				Junior NCOs		Enlisted
Botswana Ground Force							No insignia
Botswana Ground Force	Warrant officer class 1	Warrant officer class 2	Staff sergeant	Sergeant	Corporal	Lance corporal	Private (or equivalent)

== Equipment and vehicles ==
The BDF uses a wide array of modern weapons and vehicles. Its suppliers are Russia and Western nations, including Switzerland, the United States, France, Germany, the Netherlands, Austria, Belgium, Italy, and the United Kingdom.

In 2016 the Ministry of Defence of Botswana ordered 45 Piranha 8×8 armoured vehicles made by General Dynamics Switzerland.

== Sources ==
- International Institute for Strategic Studies (15 February 2019). The Military Balance 2019. London: Routledge. ISBN 9781857439885.
- Kenosi, Lekoko. The Botswana Defence Force and Public Trust: The Military Dilemma in a Democracy.
- Tiroyamodimo, Otitisitswe B. (December 2001). "Why is security a contested concept?". Sethamo (Botswana Defence Force Newsletter).
