= Indians in Botswana =

Ethnic group

Total population
- 7,000-8,000 (2015)

Regions with significant populations
- Gaborone, Selebi-Phikwe

Languages
- English, Gujarati, Malayalam, Telugu, Kannada, Bengali, Tamil

Religion
- Hinduism, Christianity, Islam, Sikhism

Indians in Botswana do not form a very large population. As of 2016, an estimated 7,000-8,000 residents of Botswana are of Indian origin, of which 3,000-4,000 are citizens of Botswana. Most Indians are employed in the retail, manufacturing, teaching, and accounting professions. Indian emigrants to Botswana primarily come from the states of Gujarat, Kerala, Andhra Pradesh, Karnataka, West Bengal, and Tamil Nadu.

== History ==
A few Indian families from South Africa migrated to Botswana in the beginning of the 20th century. Initially engaged in general trading, they gradually built up big businesses by purchasing dealerships for international products, and also successfully investing in property. Most of them acquired local citizenship. This was possible as Botswana permits expatriates with over ten years’ residence in the country to apply for permanent residence status and citizenship. A number of Indians who went to the country more recently have also become citizens of Botswana. Some of them have taken an active part in politics.

== Diamond business ==
The discovery of diamonds and their mining from the late 1960s saw the beginning of a sustained economic boom in Botswana. This attracted many more PIOs to this country. Both professionals and businessmen arrived there from several African countries, especially South Africa, Zambia, Zimbabwe and even from Kenya and Uganda. Botswana's government does not encourage immigration of foreign labour, but with its shortage of skilled manpower, it started recruiting Indian experts directly from India from the late 1980s – teachers, doctors, engineers and civil servants.. The political leadership and the higher bureaucracy are appreciative of its contribution towards the development of the country.

== Notable people ==
=== Politics ===
While no PIO has so far won any election to the parliament of Botswana, one has become a nominated member.

=== Law ===
Justice Lakhvinder Singh Walia of Indian descent is a senior judge serving in the Highest Court of Appeal of Botswana.

== See also ==
- Hinduism in Botswana
- Chinese people in Botswana
- Zimbabweans in Botswana
- Botswana–India relations
