= Lakhvinder Singh Walia =

Senior Judge of Botswana

Hon. Justice Lakhvinder Singh Walia

Judge of Court of Appeal (Botswana)
- Incumbent
- Assumed office 2017

Acting Chief Justice of High Court (Botswana) at Gaborone
- In office 2014–2014

Personal details
- Citizenship: Botswana
- Occupation: Judge

Justice Lakhwinder Singh Walia was a senior Botswanian judge who has served as the Acting Chief Justice of High Court of Botswana. He served as a judge of the Court of Appeal of Botswana.

== Early life ==
He was born in a Sikh family with having Indian descent. He has a brother named Satvinder Singh Walia who is the owner of Engen Truck Inn, a service station. Earlier, Walia worked as an attorney at his own private firm.

== Career ==
Prior to working in judiciary, Walia was working as a private lawyer. Walia started his career in judiciary in April 2001 when he was appointed as an acting Judge of the High Court. Again, from August 2002, he was appointed as an acting Judge. He was appointed as a substantive judge of High Court in January 2003.

He has served as a judge of High Court of Botswana at both Lobatse and Gaborone High Court divisions. He has also served as the Acting Chief Justice of the High Court for a brief period. He was meant to retire on December 31, 2016 upon reaching the age of retirement at 70. Initially, his contract was extended by the government for six months which allowed him to complete his cases. He served as a judge for the High Court for nearly 15 years. After that, he was appointed as a judge of the Court of Appeal of Botswana in 2017.

== Contract extension ==
In 2017, Walia's contract extension caused a stir around the nation after being appointed to the Court of Appeal. He had reached the age of retirement, but this extension was given based on his experience as a judge. It was also discussed in the Parliament of Botswana with Minister of Defence, Justice and Security Shaw Kgathi addressing it. His contract was further extended in 2020 which caused widespread discussions and garnered criticism.

== Controversies ==
Justice Walia and President of Court of Appeal Tebogo Tau were reported to the Directorate on Corruption and Economic Crime by a litigant in the case involving Stanbic Bank, Hollard Insurance Botswana and the Non-Bank Financial Institutions Regulatory Authority (NBFIRA). Other controversies including a conflict of interest in the case and being reported to the Chief Justice due to his judgements and remarks that caused widespread stir. His remarks in one case were defended by the State's Attorney General who accused the High Court of twisting another judge's remarks as Walia's.

== Notable judgements ==
He presided over a case related with government of Botswana's mistreatment against Bushmen tribe also known as San people. He asked the government to clarify the water regulations and the Bushmen tribe to state the quantity of water needed from the well. The court's decision and his remarks about the case were criticised as they were in the favour of government.

The case was related with drilling a well to access water around Central Kalahari Game Reserve by Bushmen tribe. It was not allowed by the government which asked the tribal people to move upon discovery of diamonds in Kalahari Game Reserve. Later on, the Court of Appeal overturned this decision and gave a globally praised judgement in favour of the Bushmen tribe in 2011.

In 2011, he was the judge in case of an American national, a veterinarian, Dr. Clay Wilson. Wilson went to the high court against President Ian's interference in administration of justice and his remarks. President Ian declared him as a prohibited immigrant. Walia gave his judgement against Wilson and asserted that he must go home.

Wilson said that this was related to an invitation revoked by Environment Ministry without giving a reason. His visa was also cancelled, and he was to be deported back. To resolve this issue, he went to meet the president's secretary and was peeking around every room to find the secretary. In one room, which he described as a bathroom, he encountered the President and was grabbed by his security guards which caused further commotion leading him to being deported. Later, the President denied these allegations about him causing Wilson to being deported.

In 2020, Walia overturned High Court's decision to not hear appeal of Umbrella for Democratic Change about irregularities in elections. He allowed the opposition to appeal against the election results at the Court of Appeal. He stated the appeal case by UDC as reasonable.

Later, he was among the judges which heard the case against former President Ian Khama. Walia and other judges were not happy with the involvement of nation's spy agency which declared Khama as a national security threat. Walia further questioned and criticised the spy agency of Botswana, Directorate of Intelligence and Security and their work in the case against Khama who called the charges against him as fabricated.

== See also ==
- Court of Appeal (Botswana)
- Indians in Botswana
