= Chinese people in Botswana =

Total population
- 5,000–6,000 (2009)

Regions with significant populations
- Gaborone, Francistown

Languages
- Chinese, English, and Setswana not widely spoken

Related ethnic groups
- Overseas Chinese

There were estimated to be roughly five to six thousand Chinese people in Botswana as of 2009.

== Employment ==
As of 2009, Chinese formed the largest group of self-employment permit holders in Botswana, though Zimbabwean expatriates were the largest group of foreign workers overall. Statistics for that year also showed 1,273 Chinese expatriates holding employee permits, 11.3% of the total number. This represented 36% growth over the previous year's number of 937. Many of the self-employed work as traders in the Oriental Plaza in Gaborone. There is also an increasing number of Chinese traders in Francistown, an influx noted by locals as early as 2005. In local slang, poor-quality Chinese goods are referred to as "Fong-kongs". Some locals accuse Chinese businesspeople of violating local labour laws by forcing employees to work long hours, while others praise them for the low prices they offer.

In July 2008, new trade laws repealed the earlier Specialised Dealer licence system under which had been primarily used by Chinese and other foreigners. It was speculated that this could lead to self-employed Chinese traders being forced to leave the country; the Gaborone City Council indicated that it would be willing to license the Chinese under the "Miscellaneous Trade" category for an adjustment period of two years. The Chinese ambassador also speculated that local traders might eventually be able to out-compete the Chinese. In early 2009, Chinese were also banned from dealing in clothes; local traders had complained that the Chinese were using the Specialised Dealer system to engage in general retail sales. New trade laws reserved 13 types of retail businesses for locals only: general clothing shops, general dealers, car washes, auctioneers, fresh produce shops, funeral parlours, hairdressers, laundromats, petrol filling station, take-away restaurants, cleaning services, and curio shops.

Lawmakers have also expressed concern about the rising number of unskilled Chinese labourers coming to Botswana to work in jobs such as ditch-digging, even in deep rural areas. According to government records in 2006, there were 1,094 Chinese citizens legally registered to work in the construction industry in Botswana, slightly more than a third of the total number of legal Chinese residents at the time. A number of construction projects managed by Chinese companies, such as the Sir Seretse Khama International Airport expansion project, primary schools in Serowe, Oriental Plaza, and Dikgathong Dam, illegally employed Chinese workers whose had no work permits or whose permits had not yet been approved. However, in response to these accusations, the Chinese embassy claimed that the work permit process was already very cumbersome and that it was difficult to find locals willing to work on construction projects.

== Media ==
The Oriental Post (华侨周报), a Chinese-language weekly newspaper, was launched in May 2009. It is believed to be the first newspaper of Botswana to be printed in an international language other than English. Its president is Miles Nan (南庚戌), who also runs a construction company in Botswana. Its editor-in-chief is Tian Wentai (田文泰).

== Organisations ==
The Botswana Chinese General Chamber of Commerce (博茨瓦纳华人华侨总商会) was established in 1998. As late as 2007 it was the only non-profit Chinese organisation in the country. It organises a variety of activities including ping pong tournaments and celebrations of Chinese holidays such as the Chinese New Year and the Mid-Autumn Festival. They have also cooperated with the Botswana authorities to translate local laws into Chinese for the benefit of those who do not speak English.

In 2009, a number of other Chinese organisations were founded. One was the Botswana-China Friendship Association (博茨瓦纳-中国友好协会), in which Miles Nan was also tapped to be the executive chairman, and Botswana's former ambassador in Beijing was chosen as an honorary chairman. Another was the Botswana Huaren Golf Association (博茨瓦纳华人高尔夫球协会), which organised its inaugural tournament among locals as well as Chinese, Kenyan, Korean, South African, and Zimbabwean expatriates in July 2009.

== See also ==
- Indians in Botswana
- Zimbabweans in Botswana
- Botswana–China relations
