= List of international presidential trips made by Mokgweetsi Masisi =

International trips made by Mokgweetsi Masisi

This is a list of international presidential trips made by Mokgweetsi Masisi, the fifth President of Botswana, who served from 1 April 2018 to 1 November 2024.

== Background ==
Masisi's international travel as president received considerable coverage in the Botswana press, particularly because of the frequency and cost of his overseas trips. In August 2022, Botswana Gazette reported that Masisi had undertaken 60 international trips since assuming office in 2018, costing more than P18 million. The newspaper also reported criticism of the trips and the government's position that they were intended to advance Botswana's foreign policy and attract investment.

Masisi's frequent foreign travel was subsequently the subject of further reporting and political debate. Mmegi reported in September 2023 that Masisi had faced criticism over his overseas travel following visits to Australia, the Bahamas, Cuba, Germany and the United States. Masisi defended the trips, arguing that they helped promote Botswana internationally and produce economic benefits. Mmegi also reported in August 2023 on the political debate surrounding Masisi's frequent foreign trips and the government's argument that his international engagements advanced Botswana's foreign policy.

The subject continued to attract coverage after Masisi left office. In November 2024, Mmegi described his presidency as having involved extensive foreign travel and noted the criticism surrounding the cost of his overseas trips.

His visits to the United States also received coverage outside Botswana. In March 2023, Cardinal News reported on Masisi's repeated visits to American universities, noting visits to Florida State University in 2018, Stanford and Yale in 2019, Rutgers in 2022, Texas A&M in 2022 and Virginia Tech in 2023, which were used to promote educational, technological and economic cooperation between Botswana and the United States.

== List ==
=== 2018 ===
Country	Areas visited	Date(s)	Notes
Namibia	Windhoek	9 April	State visit to meet President Hage Geingob, strengthen bilateral relations and discuss cooperation including the Trans-Kalahari Corridor. This was Masisi's first foreign trip after his inauguration as president.
Mozambique	Maputo	16 April	Working visit to meet President Filipe Nyusi and strengthen and expand bilateral cooperation between Botswana and Mozambique.
Zimbabwe	Harare	12 August	Attended the inauguration of President Emmerson Mnangagwa following the 2018 Zimbabwean general election.
United States	Tallahassee, Orlando, Houston, New York City and Washington, D.C.	17–28 September	Working visit to several U.S. cities followed by participation in the 73rd session of the United Nations General Assembly. Masisi also attended the Nelson Mandela Peace Summit, addressed the Council on Foreign Relations and participated in conservation and business events.
Mozambique	Maputo	31 October – 2 November	Working visit focused on bilateral relations and regional issues.

=== 2019 ===
Country	Areas visited	Date(s)	Notes
Mozambique	Maputo	10–16 January	Official visit to Mozambique focused on bilateral cooperation and regional issues.
Switzerland	Davos	20–26 January	Attended the World Economic Forum Annual Meeting in Davos and held meetings with international political and business leaders.
United States	Las Vegas	28 May – 7 June	Attended the JCK Las Vegas jewellery show and officially opened the event, promoting Botswana's diamond industry.
Mozambique	Maputo	18 June	Working visit to Mozambique to strengthen bilateral relations and discuss matters of mutual interest.
South Africa	Pretoria	4–6 September	Working visit to South Africa focused on bilateral relations and cooperation between Botswana and South Africa.

=== 2020 ===
Country	Areas visited	Date(s)	Notes
Switzerland	Davos	20–24 January	Attended the World Economic Forum Annual Meeting in Davos.

=== 2021 ===
Country	Areas visited	Date(s)	Notes
Malawi	Lilongwe	6 March	Visited Malawi for a bilateral engagement with President Lazarus Chakwera.
Zambia	Lusaka	31 March	Working visit to Zambia as part of a regional tour.
Zimbabwe	Harare	31 March	Working visit to Zimbabwe as part of a regional tour.
Eswatini	Mbabane	8 April	Working visit to Eswatini as part of a regional tour.
Mozambique	Maputo	8 April	Working visit to Mozambique as part of a regional tour.
Angola	Luanda	30 May	Official visit to Angola to strengthen bilateral relations and discuss areas of cooperation.

=== 2022 ===
Country	Areas visited	Date(s)	Notes
United Arab Emirates	Dubai	11 March	Visited the United Arab Emirates for diplomatic and economic engagements.
Switzerland	Davos	22–26 May	Attended the World Economic Forum in Davos and participated in investment and economic diplomacy engagements.
Sweden	Stockholm	2–3 June	Working visit focused on investment and bilateral cooperation.
Rwanda	Kigali	23–25 June	Attended the Commonwealth Heads of Government Meeting 2022 and related Commonwealth engagements.
Austria	Vienna	26–28 June	Working visit following the Commonwealth Heads of Government Meeting.
Belgium	Brussels	29 June	Working visit following engagements in Rwanda and Austria.
United States	New York City	11–24 September	Attended the 77th session of the United Nations General Assembly and participated in high-level meetings and events.
United States	Washington, D.C. and New York City	5–19 December	Official visit to the United States for diplomatic, economic and international engagements.

=== 2023 ===
Country	Areas visited	Date(s)	Notes
Switzerland	Geneva	29 April – 3 May	Participated in meetings of the World Trade Organization and related economic and trade engagements.
Australia	Perth	3–9 September	Official visit focused on investment, mining, education and strengthening Botswana–Australia relations. Masisi participated in the Botswana-Australia Business Forum in Perth.
Bahamas	Nassau	12–15 September	Official visit to The Bahamas focused on bilateral relations and cooperation.
United States	New York City	19–23 September	Attended the 78th session of the United Nations General Assembly and participated in related high-level meetings.
United Arab Emirates	Dubai	30 November – 5 December	Attended international engagements in the United Arab Emirates and participated in meetings promoting Botswana's economic and investment interests.
United States	Washington, D.C.	11–18 December	Official visit to the United States for bilateral and economic engagements.

=== 2024 ===
Country	Areas visited	Date(s)	Notes
Zambia	Lusaka	26–27 March	Working visit to Zambia focused on bilateral relations and regional cooperation.
United States	Washington, D.C. and New York City	28 April – 13 May	Official visit to the United States for bilateral, economic and international engagements.
France	Paris	18–20 June	Official visit to France focused on bilateral relations, economic cooperation and international affairs.
Germany	Berlin	21–22 June	Official visit following his visit to France, focused on bilateral and economic cooperation.
Mozambique	Maputo	10–12 July	Official visit to Mozambique focused on bilateral relations and cooperation.
Namibia	Windhoek and Swakopmund	2–5 July	Official visit to Namibia focused on bilateral relations, economic cooperation and the Trans-Kalahari Railway project.
Rwanda	Kigali	11 August	Attended the inauguration ceremony of President Paul Kagame for his fourth term in office.
United States	New York City	21–25 September	Attended the 79th session of the United Nations General Assembly.

== See also ==
- Foreign relations of Botswana
- List of international presidential trips made by Duma Boko, his successor
