= List of international presidential trips made by Duma Boko =

International trips made by Duma Boko

This is a list of international presidential trips made by Duma Boko, the sixth and current President of Botswana, who has served since 1 November 2024.

== Background ==
Duma Boko's international travel has received coverage from independent media since the beginning of his presidency. In February 2025, Mmegi reported on Boko's foreign travel during his first 100 days in office, discussing his diplomatic engagements in Zimbabwe, Belgium, Ghana and Tanzania, as well as the political and economic purposes of his international travel. However, because there are no reliable citations for these trips other than his Belgian trip, the first 100 days trips will not be included on the list.

Boko's foreign travel has also attracted political scrutiny. In February 2025, Botswana's Minister for International Affairs defended the president's international trips following criticism that the frequency of his travel could place a burden on the country's finances. Later that year, CAJ News reported that Boko faced criticism over his use of private foreign visits, with opposition figures calling for greater transparency concerning the trips and their purposes.

== List ==
=== 2024 ===
Country	Areas visited	Date(s)	Notes
Belgium	Antwerp	25–28 November	Attended the FACETS 2024 diamond conference at the Antwerp World Diamond Centre and promoted Botswana's diamond industry.

=== 2025 ===
Country	Areas visited	Date(s)	Notes
Ethiopia	Addis Ababa	13–18 February	Attended the African Union 38th Ordinary Session of the Assembly of Heads of State and Government, as well as related high-level meetings on governance, economic development, trade and investment.
United States	Los Angeles, Washington, D.C.	3–7 March	Working visit to the United States, including meetings in Washington, D.C. with U.S. Secretary of State Marco Rubio and representatives of the Corporate Council on Africa. Boko had originally been scheduled to attend the launch of Botswana's first satellite in Los Angeles.
Mozambique	Nacala	26–29 March	Working visit focused on economic cooperation, regional trade and strengthening bilateral relations with Mozambique.
South Africa	Pretoria	27–29 April	Working visit at the invitation of President Cyril Ramaphosa, during which Boko engaged with his South African counterpart.
Zambia	Lusaka	1–2 August	State visit during which Boko co-chaired the inaugural session of the Zambia–Botswana Bi-National Commission and served as Guest of Honour at the official opening of the 97th Zambia Agriculture and Commercial Show. Several memoranda of understanding were signed in areas including agriculture, energy, transport, tourism and disaster risk management.
South Africa	Johannesburg	3–5 September	Private visit to South Africa.
United Arab Emirates	Dubai	5–9 September	Working visit focused on high-level business meetings with potential investors and promoting Botswana as a destination for trade, investment and tourism.
South Africa	Cape Town	28 December 2025 – 7 January 2026	Private external visit. During the visit, Vice President Ndaba Gaolathe served as Acting President of Botswana.

=== 2026 ===
Country	Areas visited	Date(s)	Notes
United Arab Emirates	Dubai	2–6 February	Attended the World Governments Summit 2026 and held bilateral engagements with leaders and officials, including representatives of Serbia, Antigua and Barbuda, and the UAE, to strengthen diplomatic and economic cooperation.
Ethiopia	Addis Ababa	12–16 February	Attended the African Union 39th Ordinary Session of the Assembly of Heads of State and Government, held under the theme "Water Security and Climate Resilience".
France	Lyon, Paris	6–9 April	Working visit to attend the One Health Summit in Lyon and hold bilateral talks with President Emmanuel Macron and French business leaders. The visit was Boko's first official visit to France.
Spain	Madrid	9 April	Working visit following his visit to France, focused on economic diplomacy and bilateral cooperation. Boko held talks with Prime Minister Pedro Sánchez.
Zimbabwe	Harare	21–23 April	State visit during which Boko held bilateral talks with Zimbabwean officials.
South Africa	Durban	16–17 August	Attended the Southern African Development Community (SADC) 46th Ordinary Summit of Heads of State and Government in Durban. The summit addressed regional integration, industrialisation, infrastructure development, agriculture, critical minerals, peace and security, and economic integration. Boko also held bilateral engagements on the sidelines of the summit.
Angola	Luanda, Benguela	7–9 September	State visit during which Boko met with President João Lourenço, participated in the Angola–Botswana Economic Business Forum, and visited the Lobito Refinery.
United States	New York City	19–26 September	Attended the 81st Session of the United Nations General Assembly. On 23 September, Boko and First Lady Kaone Boko attended an event co-hosted by De Beers and National Geographic during Climate Week NYC, marking the renewal of the Okavango Eternal partnership. On 24 September, he spoke at the Presidential Diamond Jubilee reception at Rockefeller Center, where he was interviewed by Time CEO Jessica Sibley and said demand for diamonds was recovering.
China	Beijing, Fuzhou	12–17 October	State visit at the invitation of President Xi Jinping, and Boko's first visit to China since taking office. On 13 October, Boko held talks with Xi at the Great Hall of the People, and the two leaders announced the elevation of bilateral relations to a comprehensive strategic cooperative partnership. The visit also included a trip to Fujian province.
Turkey	Antalya	10–15 November	Attended the 2026 United Nations Climate Change Conference (COP31) Leaders' Summit in Antalya, where he called for urgent climate action and implementation to address droughts, rising temperatures, and water shortages.
Ivory Coast	Abidjan	15–18 November	State visit during which Boko met with President Alassane Ouattara and held talks focused on cooperation in mining, energy, agriculture, and trade, with Botswana serving as guest of honor at the second International Exhibition of Extractive and Energy Resources (SIREXE 2026).

== See also ==
- Foreign relations of Botswana
- List of international presidential trips made by Mokgweetsi Masisi, his predecessor
