= Botswana–Zimbabwe relations =

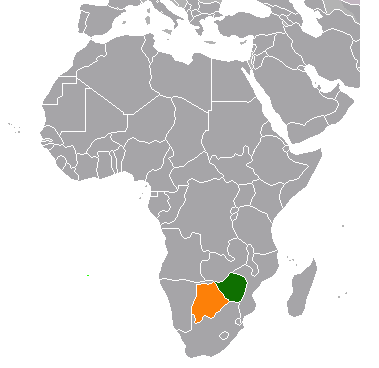

- Botswana: Zimbabwe

Diplomatic mission
- Embassy of Botswana in Harare: Embassy of Zimbabwe in Gaborone

Botswana–Zimbabwe relations are bilateral relations between two neighbouring landlocked Southern African nations of Botswana and Zimbabwe. Both nations are members of the African Union, United Nations, Southern African Development Community and the Non-Aligned Movement. Botswana has an embassy in Harare. Zimbabwe has an embassy in Gaborone.

Two countries established formal diplomatic relations in 1983 after protracted Zimbabwe War of Independence in which Botswana welcomed refugees but refrained from directly supporting the liberation movement due to existential concerns over encirclement by Rhodesia, South West Africa and South Africa.

Zimbabwe is one of the main trading partners of Botswana with two countries signing the original bilateral trade agreement in 1988. Botswana and Zimbabwe share some 500 kilometres long common border. Large scale migration from Zimbabwe to Botswana following the economic crisis of early 2000s led to increased xenophobic violence, border control measures with then President of Botswana Ian Khama designating Zimbabwe as an unfriendly neighbour.

Following the 2008 Zimbabwean general election Botswana played important role in preventing escalation of hostilities between parties involved in post-election confrontations and challenges. During his visit to Zimbabwe on 1 September 2022 President of Botswana Mokgweetsi Masisi called for the removal of western sanctions imposed on ZANU–PF officials.

== See also ==
- Foreign relations of Botswana
- Foreign relations of Zimbabwe
- Zimbabweans in Botswana

== Sources ==
- Eugene Campbell; Jonathan Crush (2012). Unfriendly Neighbours: Contemporary migration from Zimbabwe to Botswana. Cape Town: Southern African Migration Programme. ISBN 978-1-920596-16-3.
