= Botswana–Israel relations =

- Botswana: Israel

Israel and Botswana have official relations though neither country maintains a formal consulate or embassy in the other. The two countries, nevertheless, have reached cooperate agreements at the government level and there is private sector activity between the two countries.

== History ==
The two countries established diplomatic ties in 1972, broke them off due to the Arab-Israeli conflict, and re-established them in 1993 after Israel and the PLO signed the Oslo Accords. In February 2012, Dan Shaham-Ben-Hayun presented his diplomatic credentials to Botswana as an official representative. However, he is currently based in Namibia.

== Economic and educational ties ==
Six Israeli companies are licensed to cut and polish diamonds in Botswana, employing over 1,000 Botswana citizens.

In December 2012, Israel and Botswana formalised an agreement to establish the Botswana International University of Science and Technology (BIUST), with Ben-Gurion University (BGU) leading the academic and research aspects of the institution. Despite delays caused by the 2008 financial crisis and challenges in curriculum development, the project gained momentum after Botswana’s education minister, Pelonomi Venson-Moitoi, visited Israel and was impressed by BGU’s expertise in desert studies. Under the agreement, BGU will provide academic content, and Israeli lecturers will contribute to training local staff, fostering knowledge exchange between the two nations. The initiative also involves Israeli support in constructing the university’s physical infrastructure, with plans for BIUST to grow gradually into a full-fledged university. The collaboration positions BGU as a global leader in desert research while addressing Botswana's need for a specialised science and technology institution.

In 2015, Richard Anthony Lyons was appointed as Israel's honorary consul in Botswana.

== See also ==
- Foreign relations of Botswana
- Foreign relations of Israel
- History of the Jews in Botswana
