= List of diplomatic missions of Botswana =

This is a list of diplomatic missions of Botswana. Botswana has a small but far-reaching network of foreign missions abroad.

As a member of the Commonwealth of Nations, Botswanan diplomatic missions in the capitals of other Commonwealth member-states are known as High Commissions.

Excluded from this listing are honorary consulates and trade missions.

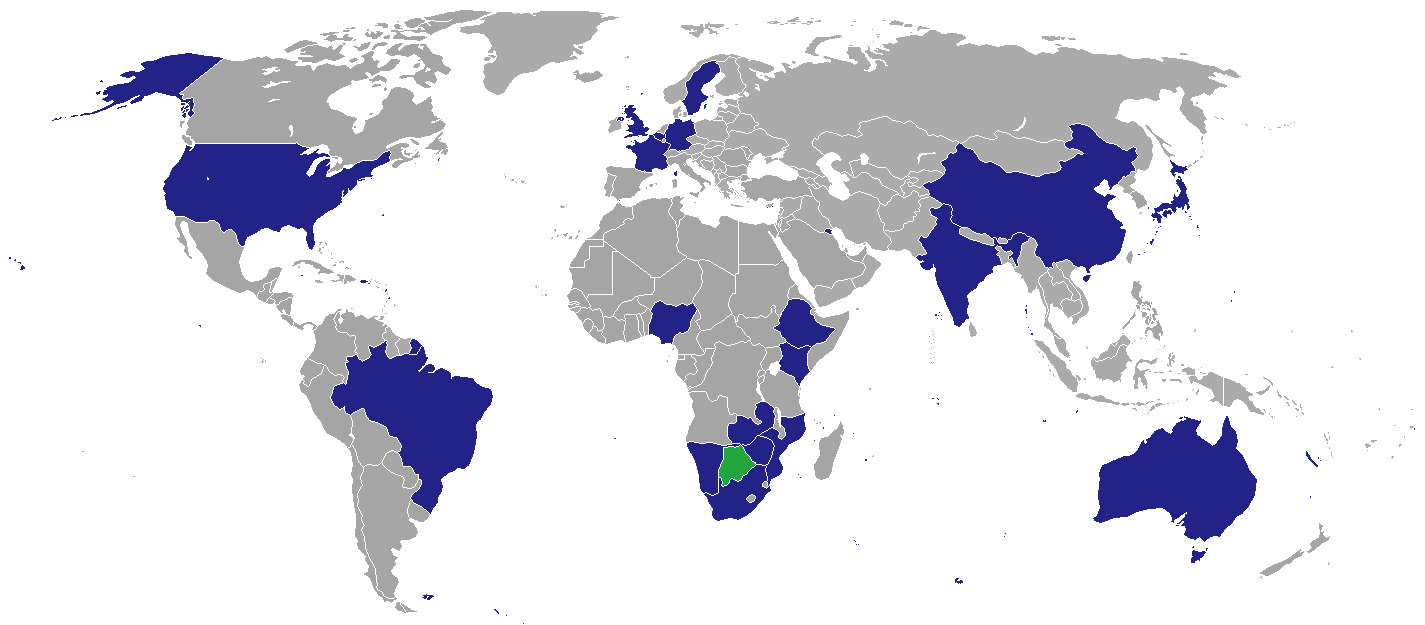
Countries hosting a diplomatic missions of Botswana

== Africa ==
Host country	Host city	Mission	Concurrent accreditation	Ref.
Ethiopia	Addis Ababa	Embassy	Countries: Algeria; Egypt; Libya; Morocco; Tunisia; International Organizations: African Union; United Nations Economic Commission for Africa	
Kenya	Nairobi	High Commission	Countries: Burundi; Rwanda; South Sudan; Sudan; Uganda; International Organizations: United Nations; United Nations Environment Programme; United Nations Human Settlements Programme	
Mozambique	Maputo	High Commission	Countries: Comoros; Madagascar; Mauritius; Seychelles	
Namibia	Windhoek	High Commission	Countries: Angola; Congo-Brazzaville; International Organizations: Southern African Customs Union	
Nigeria	Abuja	High Commission	Countries: Benin; Burkina Faso; Cameroon; Gambia; Ghana; Guinea; Ivory Coast; Liberia; Mali; Senegal; Sierra Leone; Togo; International Organizations: Economic Community of West African States	
South Africa	Pretoria	High Commission	Countries: Eswatini; Lesotho	
South Africa	Cape Town	Consulate-General	Countries: Eswatini; Lesotho	
South Africa	Johannesburg	Consulate-General	Countries: Eswatini; Lesotho	
Zambia	Lusaka	High Commission	Countries: Congo-Kinshasa; Tanzania	
Zimbabwe	Harare	Embassy	Countries: Malawi	

== Americas ==
Host country	Host city	Mission	Concurrent accreditation	Ref.
Brazil	Brasília	Embassy	Countries: Argentina; Chile; Colombia; Guyana; Paraguay; Venezuela; Uruguay; International Organizations: Caribbean Community; Mercosur	
United States	Washington, D.C.	Embassy	Countries: Antigua and Barbuda; Bahamas; Barbados; Canada; Dominican Republic; Grenada; Haiti; Mexico; Trinidad and Tobago; International Organizations: International Monetary Fund; World Bank Group	

== Asia ==
Host country	Host city	Mission	Concurrent accreditation	Ref.
China	Beijing	Embassy	Countries: Malaysia; Pakistan; Singapore; North Korea; Vietnam; International Organizations: Association of Southeast Asian Nations	
India	New Delhi	High Commission	Countries: Bangladesh; Bhutan; Maldives; Nepal; Sri Lanka	
Japan	Tokyo	Embassy	Countries: Philippines; South Korea; Thailand	
Kuwait	Kuwait City	Embassy	Countries: Bahrain; Oman; Palestine; Qatar; Saudi Arabia; United Arab Emirates; Yemen	

== Europe ==
Host country	Host city	Mission	Concurrent accreditation	Ref.
Belgium	Brussels	Embassy	Countries: Italy; Luxembourg; Netherlands; International Organizations: European Union; Organisation for the Prohibition of Chemical Weapons; World Food Programme	
France	Paris	Embassy	International Organizations: UNESCO	
Germany	Berlin	Embassy	Countries: Poland	
Sweden	Stockholm	Embassy	Countries: Denmark; Estonia; Finland; Holy See; Iceland; Latvia; Lithuania; Norway; Russia; Ukraine	
United Kingdom	London	High Commission	Countries: Croatia; Cyprus; Czechia; Ireland; Israel; Malta; Portugal; Romania; Serbia; Slovakia; Spain; International Organizations: Commonwealth of Nations	

== Oceania ==
Host country	Host city	Mission	Concurrent accreditation	Ref.
Australia	Canberra	High Commission	Countries: Fiji; Indonesia; New Zealand; Papua New Guinea; Samoa; Solomon Islands	

== Multilateral organizations ==
Organization	Host city	Host country	Mission	Concurrent accreditation	Ref.
United Nations	New York City	United States	Permanent Mission	Countries: Cuba; Guatemala; Jamaica	
United Nations	Geneva	Switzerland	Permanent Mission	Countries: Austria; Greece; Switzerland; Turkey; International Organizations: International Atomic Energy Agency; International Organization for Migration; World Health Organization; World Trade Organization; UNIDO	

== Mission to open ==
Host country	Host city	Mission	Ref.
Oman	Muscat	Embassy	

== Gallery ==
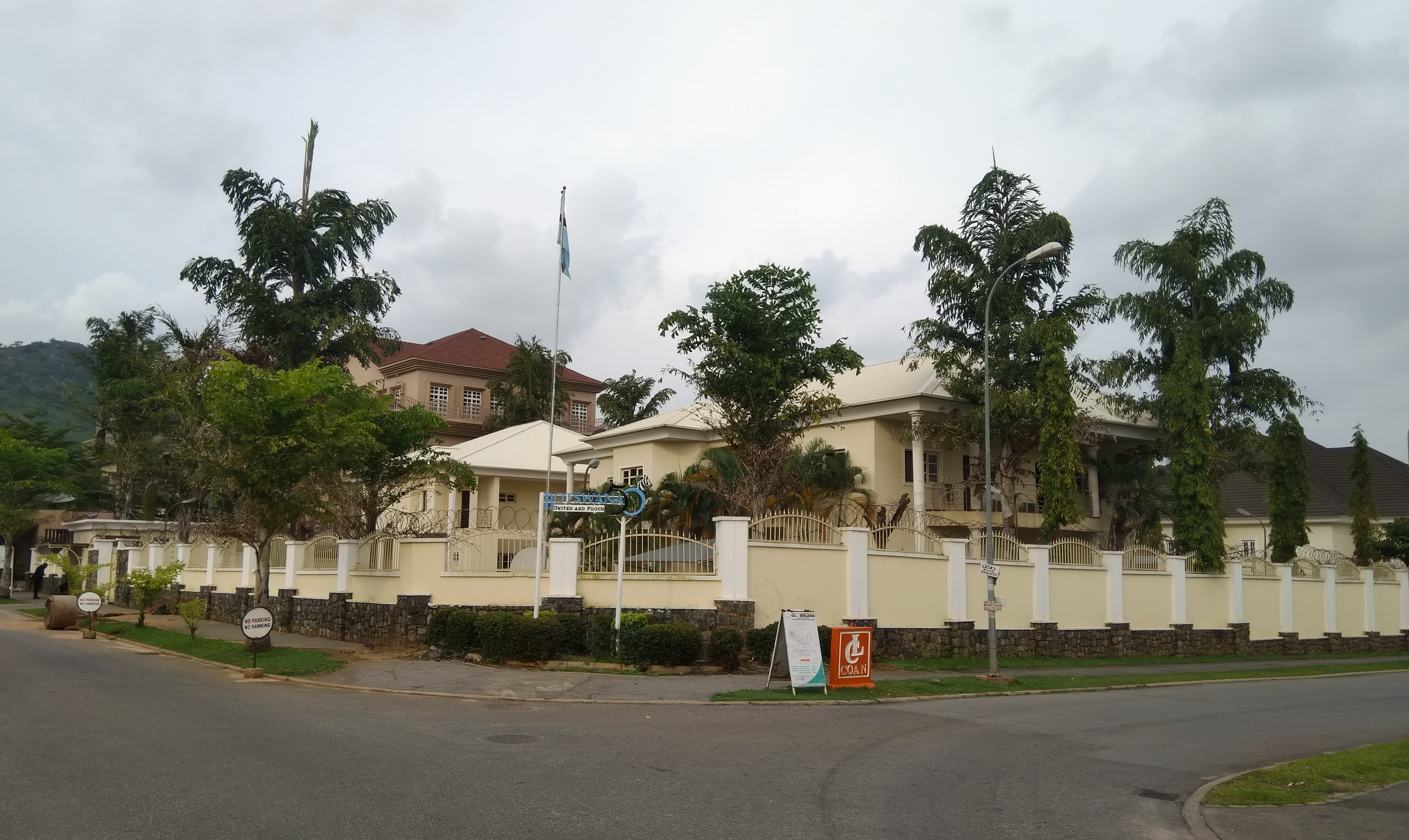
High Commission in Abuja

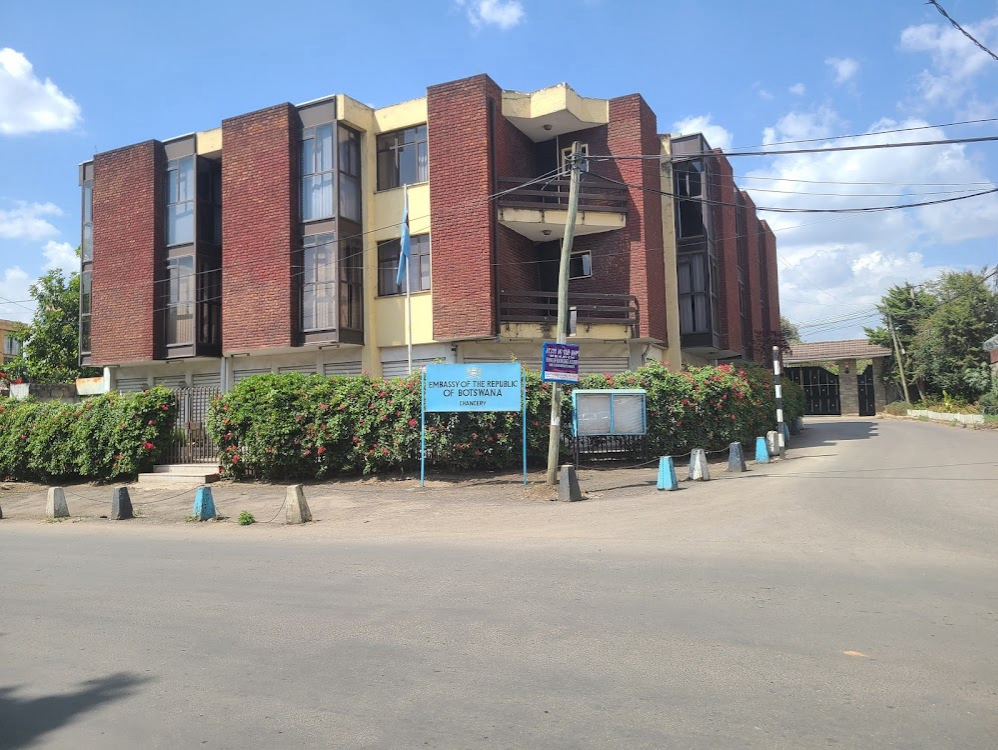
Embassy in Addis Ababa

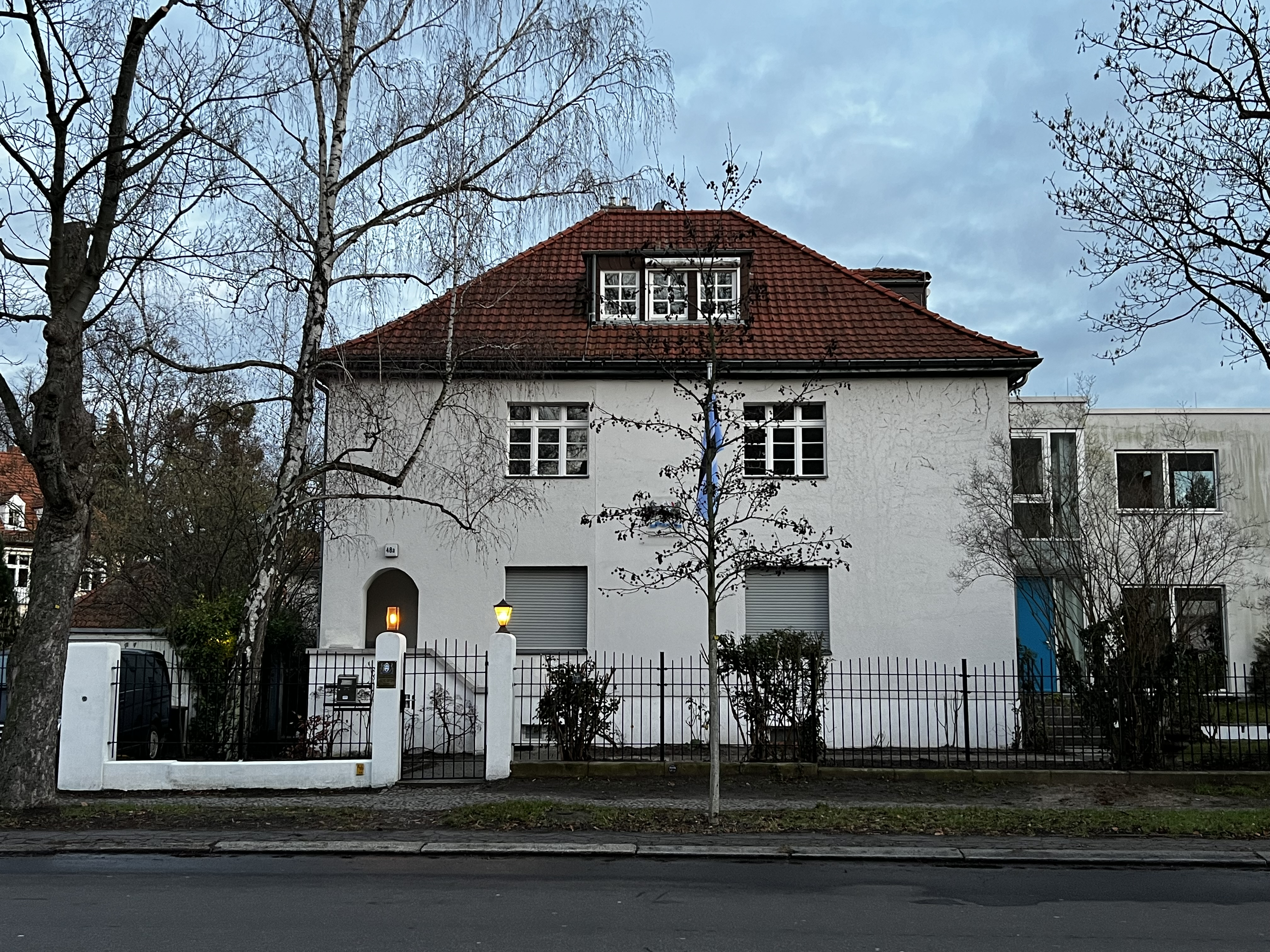
Embassy in Berlin

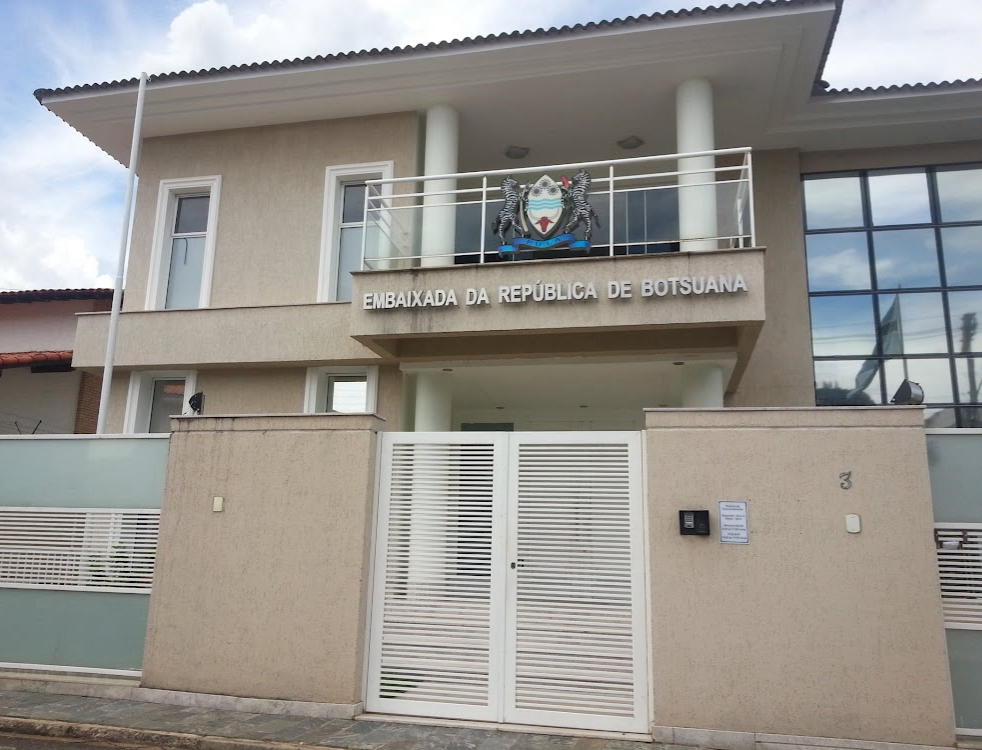
Embassy in Brasilia

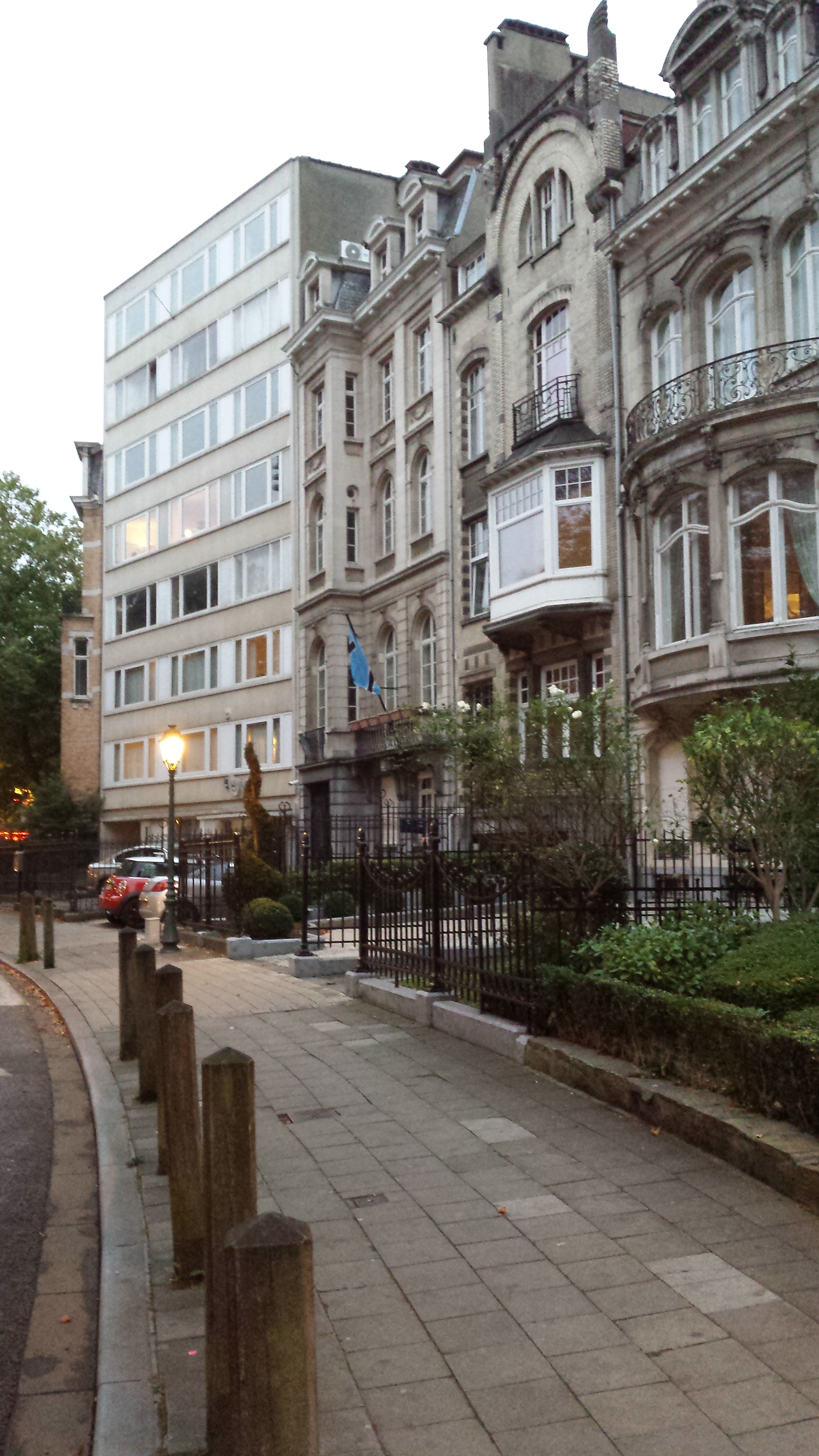
Embassy in Brussels

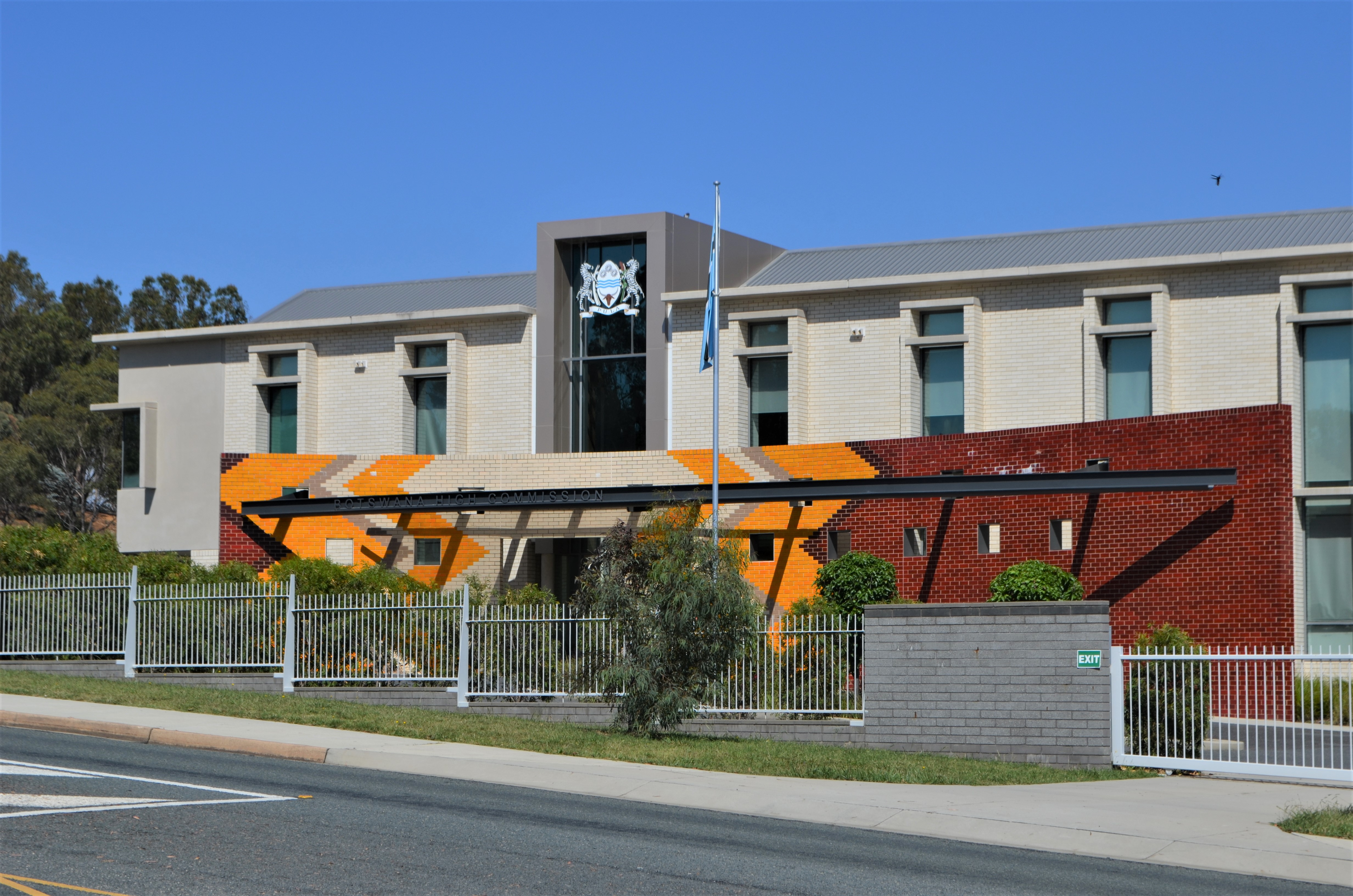
High Commission in Canberra

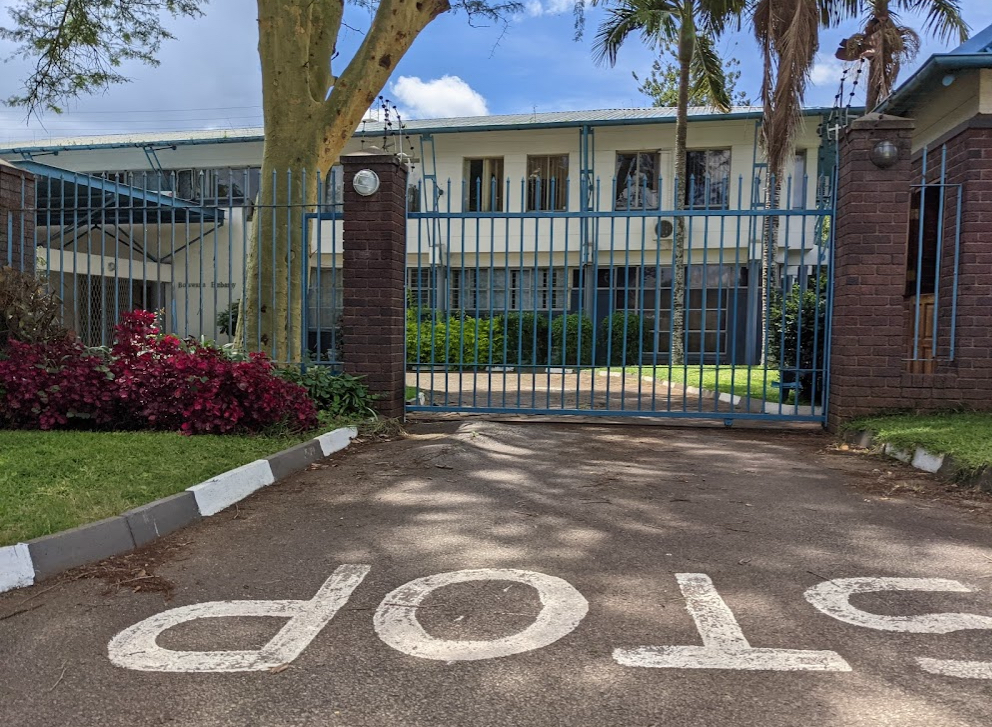
Embassy in Harare

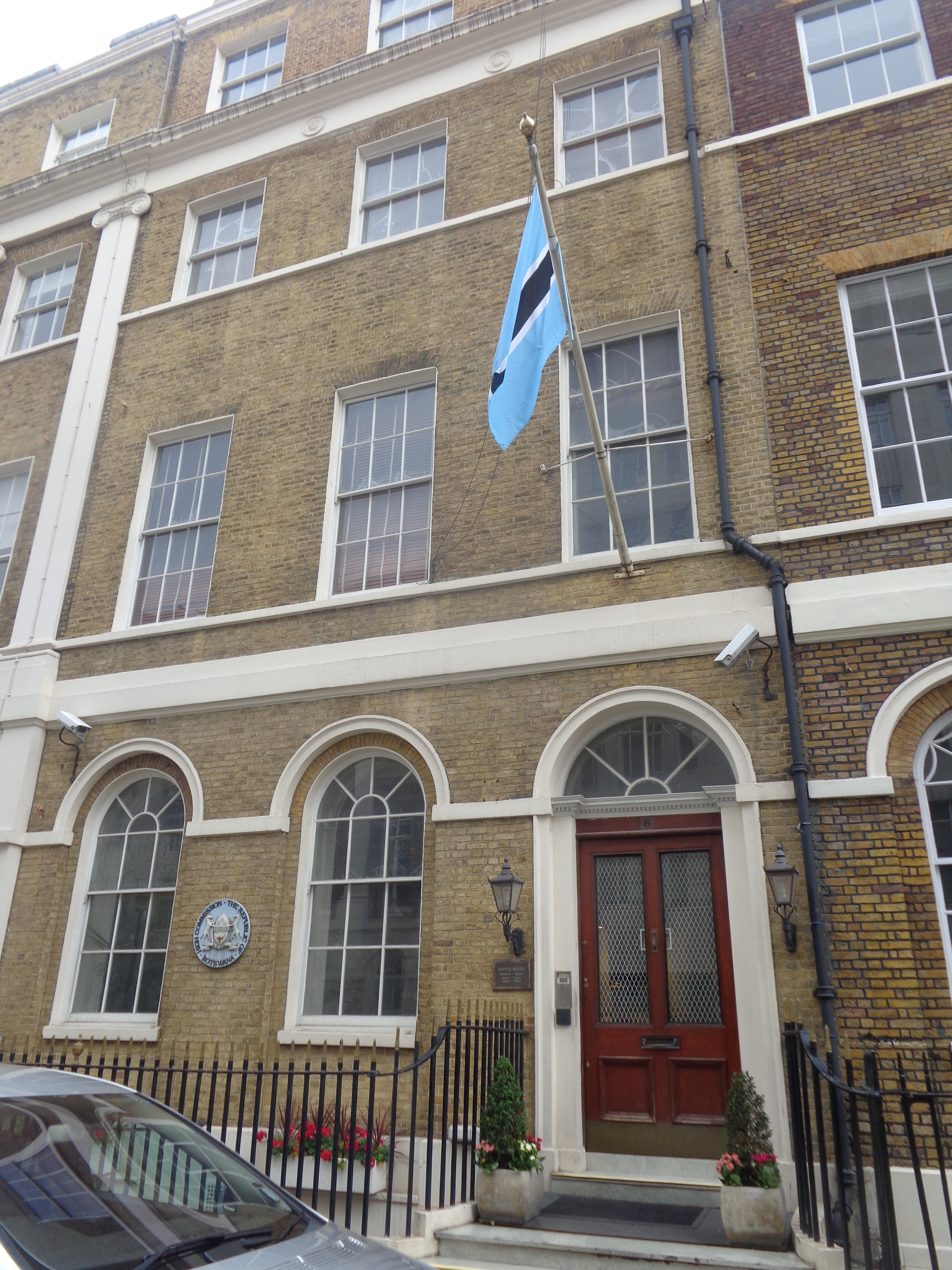
High Commission in London

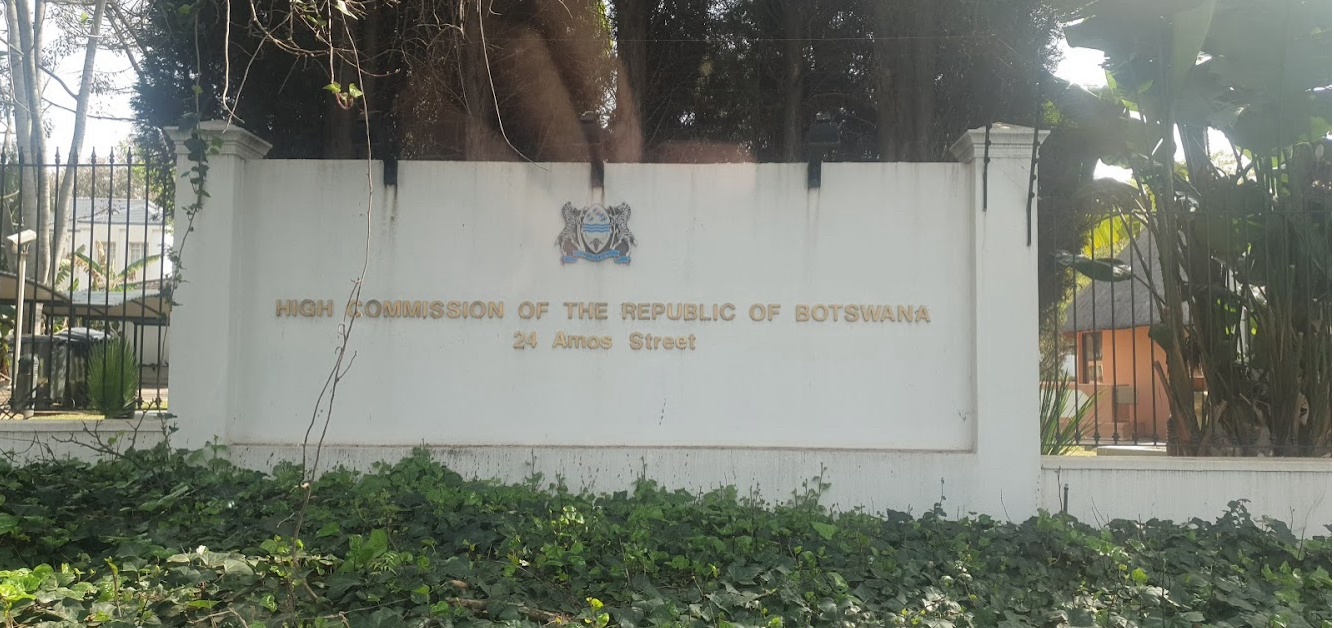
High Commission in Pretoria

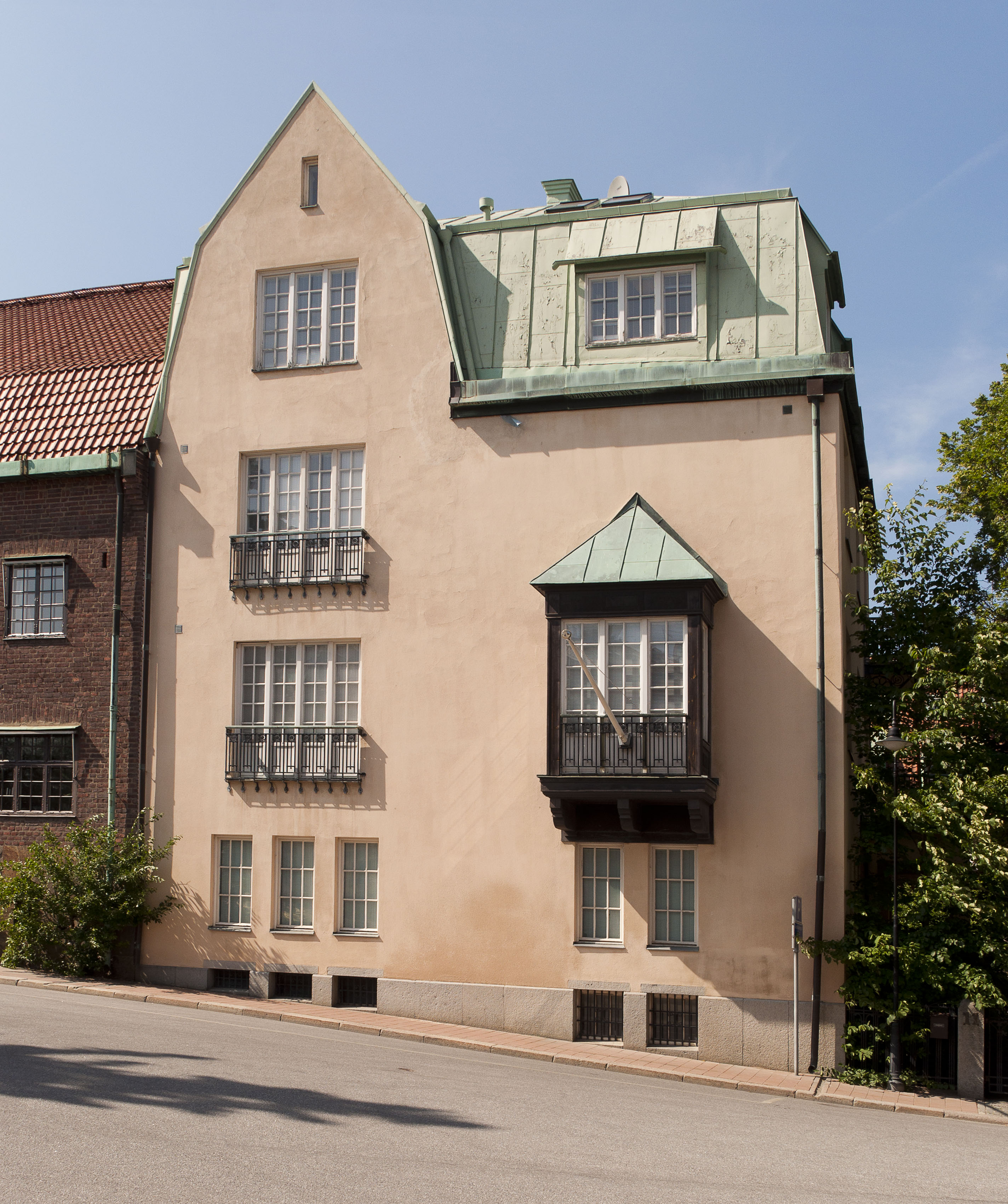
Embassy in Stockholm

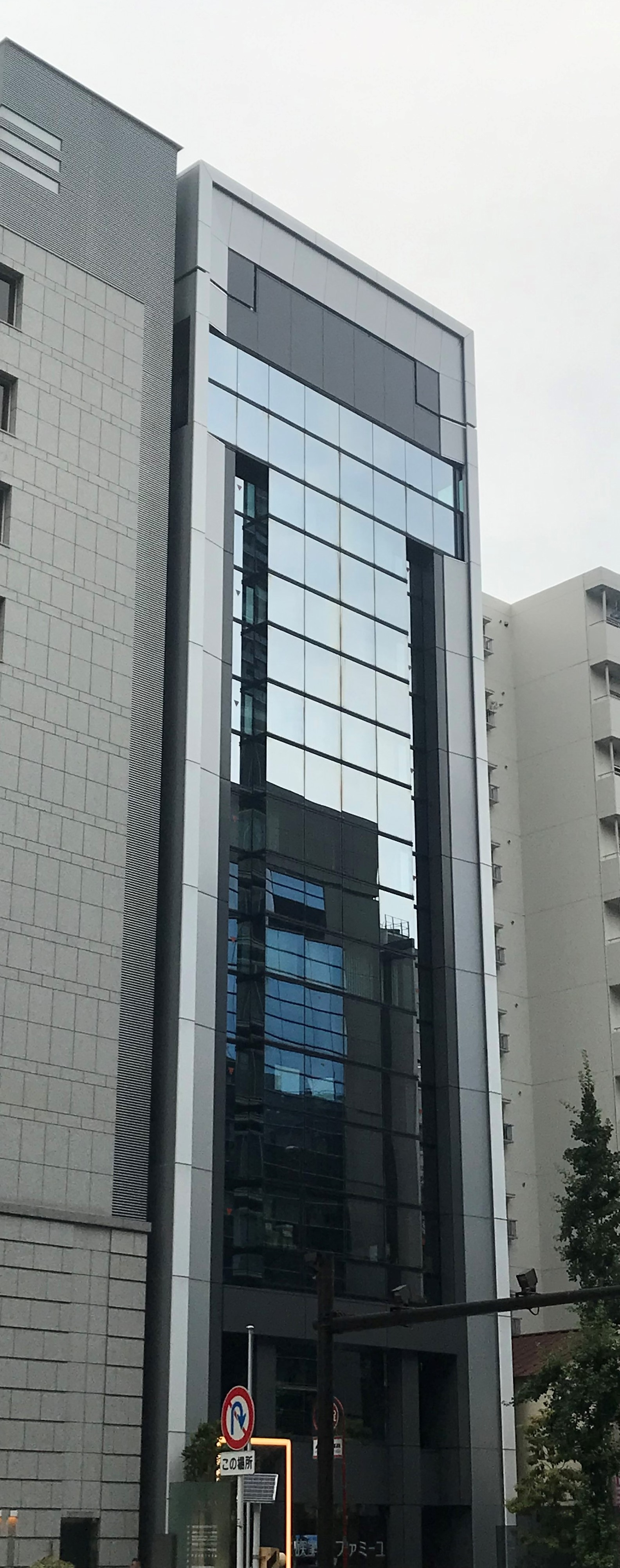
Building hosting the Embassy in Tokyo

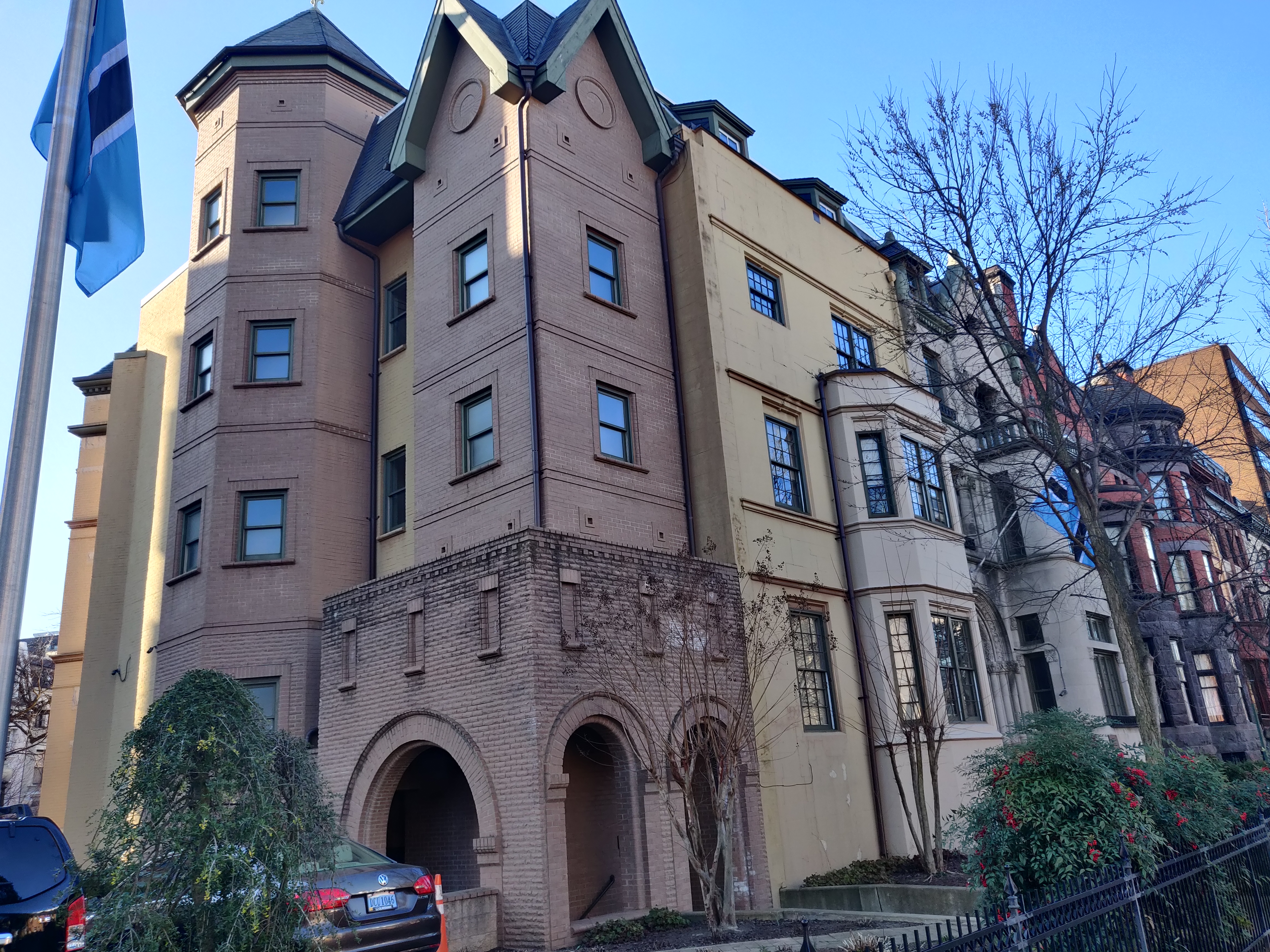
Embassy in Washington, D.C.

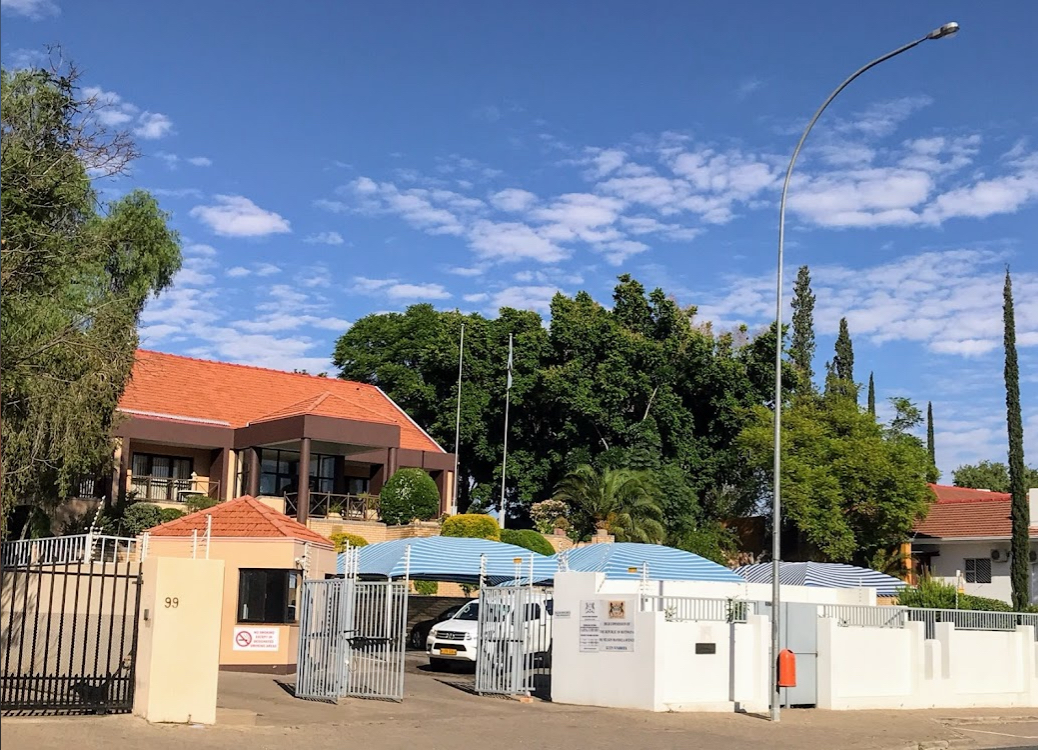
High Commission in Windhoek

== See also ==
- Foreign relations of Botswana
- List of diplomatic missions in Botswana
- Visa policy of Botswana
