= Botswana–Russia relations =

- Botswana: Russia

Botswana–Russia relations date back to 6 March 1970 when Botswana and the Soviet Union established diplomatic relations. Botswana has a non resident ambassador based in Stockholm. Russia has an embassy in Gaborone.

According to the Minister of Foreign Affairs, Russia was one of the first countries to establish full diplomatic relations with Botswana.

== Botswana–Soviet relations ==
Botswana and the Soviet Union established diplomatic relations on 6 March 1970, and Soviet affairs were initially handled through the Soviet Embassy in Lusaka, Zambia. Despite its pro-Western orientation, Botswana participated in the 1980 Summer Olympics, making its first appearance in the Olympic Games in Moscow. Also on January 14, 1977, in the call of attacks on Botswana by Southern Rhodesia, the Soviet Union joined the United Nations Security Council Resolution 403 to condemn the attacks.

== Bilateral relations ==
Trade and economic cooperation between Russia and Botswana are stipulated by the Trade Agreement of 1987 and the Agreement on Economic and Technical Cooperation of 1988. The Government of the Russian Federation and the Government of the Republic of Botswana signed the Agreement on Cultural, Scientific and Educational Cooperation in September 1999. Russia and Botswana have had fruitful cooperation in a variety of fields, particularly in human resource development. And Russia is still offering more scholarship in key sectors such as health, which is currently experiencing a critical shortage of manpower. Botswana also is one of the countries where Russian citizens do not require a visa.

== See also ==
- Foreign relations of Botswana
- Foreign relations of Russia
