= Botswana–Kenya relations =

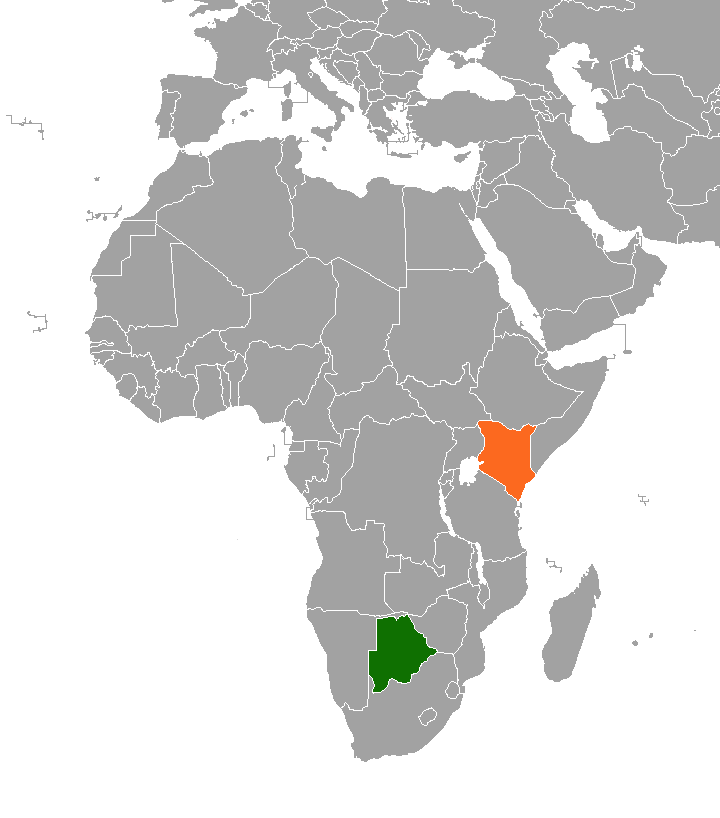
- Botswana: Kenya

Botswana–Kenya relations are bilateral relations between Botswana and Kenya.

== History ==
Immediately after Uhuru Kenyatta was elected as President of Kenya, Botswana threatened to ban Kenyatta from entering the country if he did not co-operate with the ICC.

Botswana had also initially rejected the AU's resolution to drop Kenyatta's case in the ICC, becoming one of Africa's only supporter of the ICC. Botswana was the only country that rejected the resolution. Even neighbouring South Africa was one of the countries that called for mass pull out of African countries from the ICC. Botswana later on supported the AU's resolution.

As diplomatic relations were strained Botswana sought to fix the strenuous relations brought about by the Botswana Foreign Minister's comments about President Uhuru Kenyatta. President Uhuru Kenyatta was set to visit Botswana in 2013 following an invitation from President Seretse Khama Ian Khama.

Kenyatta's cooperated with the ICC and charges against him were dropped in December 2014.

== Development cooperation ==
In June 2014, both countries held a business forum in Gaborone. The forum was aimed at improving trade.

== Trade ==
Kenya exports goods worth about Kes.357.1 million (US$3.7 million) to Botswana annually, these goods mostly consist of vegetables, petroleum oils, medicines, printing and book binding parts, textiles, hand and machine tools, cutlery, and furniture.

Botswana exports goods worth Kes.17.2 million (US$182,406) to Kenya, these goods mostly consist of vehicles, tractors, articles of textiles, and plastics.

== Diplomatic missions ==
- Botswana maintains a high commission in Nairobi.
- Kenya maintains a high commission in Gaborone.

== See also ==
- Foreign relations of Botswana
- Foreign relations of Kenya
