= Tebogo Tau =

President of the Court of Appeal of Botswana

President of the Court of Appeal of Botswana
- Incumbent
- Assumed office 1 December 2021

Personal details
- Occupation: Judge
- Known for: President of the Court of Appeal of Botswana

Tebogo Tau is a Botswana judge currently serving as the president of the Court of Appeal of Botswana.

She was appointed on 1 December 2021 by President Mokgweetsi Masisi. Previously, Tau served as a Lobatse High Court senior assistant registrar.
