= List of diplomatic missions in Botswana =

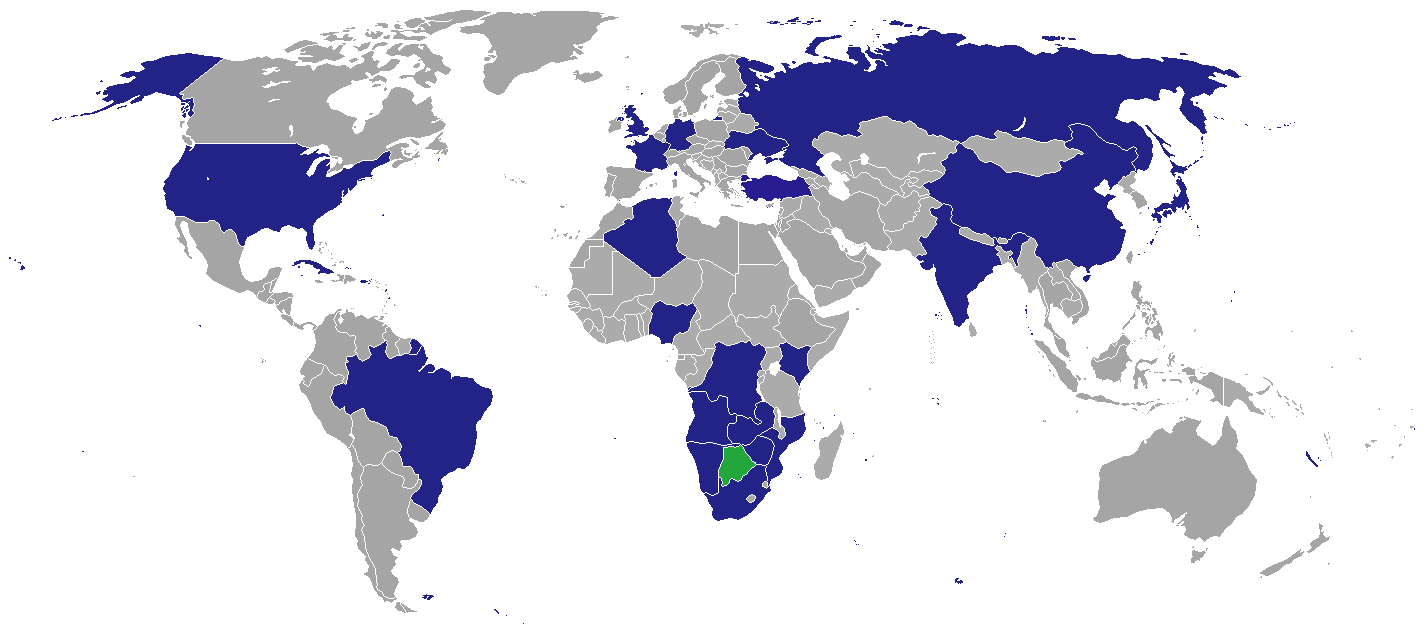
Map of the countries that have diplomatic missions in Botswana

This is a list of diplomatic missions in Botswana excluding honorary consulates. The capital Gaborone currently hosts 24 embassies and 1 delegation (European Union). The city is also host to several international organizations. Most of the non-resident diplomatic missions that are accredited to Botswana are located in South Africa.

Honorary consulates are omitted from this listing.

== Diplomatic missions in Gaborone ==
| Sending country | Location | Photo | Coordinates | Notes |
Embassies and High Commissions
| Algeria | | | | |
| Angola | Plot 13232 Khama Crescent and Nelson Mandela Road | | 24.65205°S 25.90992°E | |
| Brazil | 3rd Floor, Standard House, Lot 1124–1125, Queen's Road | | 24.65782°S 25.91820°E | |
| China | Plot 3096 North Ring Road | | 24.65020°S 25.91605°E | |
| Congo-Kinshasa | | | | |
| Cuba | Plot 1051 Semane Close, Extension 2 | | 24.66166°S 25.91418°E | |
| France | Plot 761 Robinson Road | | 24.65978°S 25.91757°E | |
| Germany | Queens Road, Plot 1079–1084, Main Mall | | | |
| India | Plot 5375 President's Drive | | 24.65316°S 25.91036°E | |
| Japan | 4th Floor, Barclays House, Plot 8842 Khama Crescent | | 24.66163°S 25.91052°E | |
| Kenya | Plot 786 Independence Avenue | | 24.66054°S 25.91886°E | |
| Libya | | | | |
| Mozambique | Plot 758 Robinson Rd, Extension 2 | | 24.66034°S 25.91753°E | |
| Namibia | Plot 186 Morara Close | | 24.65661°S 25.91467°E | |
| Nigeria | Plot 1086–1092 Queen's Road, Main Mall | | 24.65804°S 25.91396°E | |
| Russia | Plot 4711 Tawana Close | | 24.65001°S 25.91932°E | |
| Sahrawi Republic | | | | |
| South Africa | Plot 29 Queen's Road | | 24.65797°S 25.91650°E | |
| Turkey | Plot 8842, Old Barclays House | | | |
| Ukraine | | | | |
| United Kingdom | Plot 1079–1084 Main Mall, off Queens Road | | 24.65802°S 25.91346°E | |
| United States | Embassy Drive, Government Enclave | | 24.66103°S 25.90872°E | |
| Zambia | Plot 1120 Queen's Road, Main Mall | | 24.65798°S 25.91520°E | |
| Zimbabwe | Plot 8850 Orapa Close, Government Enclave | | 24.66045°S 25.90870°E | |
Other Missions
| European Union | Plot 758 Robinson Rd, Extension 2 | | 24.66034°S 25.91753°E | |

== Non-resident embassies and High Commissions ==
Most of the accredited non-resident embassies to Botswana are in Pretoria, South Africa. However, some are in Zimbabwe, Ethiopia or Namibia.

=== Resident Harare, Zimbabwe ===
1. Canada
2. Equatorial Guinea
3. Palestine
4. Rwanda

=== Resident in Pretoria, South Africa ===
1. Argentina
2. Australia
3. Austria
4. Bangladesh
5. Belarus
6. Belgium
7. Bulgaria
8. Burundi
9. Burkina Faso
10. Cameroon
11. Central African Republic
12. Chad
13. Chile
14. Colombia
15. Croatia
16. Cyprus
17. Czechia
18. Denmark
19. Egypt
20. Eswatini
21. Ethiopia
22. Finland
23. Gabon
24. Gambia
25. Georgia
26. Greece
27. Guinea
28. Guyana
29. Holy See
30. Hungary
31. Indonesia
32. Ireland
33. Ivory Coast
34. Jamaica
35. Kuwait
36. Lesotho
37. Liberia
38. Lithuania
39. Madagascar
40. Malawi
41. Malaysia
42. Mali
43. Mauritania
44. Mauritius
45. Mexico
46. Morocco
47. Nepal
48. Niger
49. Netherlands
50. New Zealand
51. Norway
52. Pakistan
53. Panama
54. Paraguay
55. Philippines
56. Poland
57. Portugal
58. Qatar
59. Romania
60. Saudi Arabia
61. Senegal
62. Serbia
63. Seychelles
64. Singapore
65. Slovakia
66. Somalia
67. South Korea
68. South Sudan
69. Sri Lanka
70. Sudan
71. Sweden
72. Switzerland
73. Tanzania
74. Thailand
75. Togo
76. Trinidad and Tobago
77. Tunisia
78. Uganda
79. United Arab Emirates
80. Uruguay
81. Vietnam

=== Resident in Windhoek, Namibia ===
1. Congo-Brazzaville
2. Ghana
3. Spain
4. Venezuela

=== Resident in other cities ===
1. Italy (Maputo)
2. Israel (Jerusalem)
3. Sierra Leone (Addis Ababa)

== Closed missions ==
| Host city | Sending country | Mission | Year closed | Ref. |
|---|---|---|---|---|
| Gaborone | Norway | Embassy | 1997 | |
| Gaborone | Poland | Embassy | 1991 | |
| Gaborone | Sweden | Embassy | 2008 | |

== Mission to open ==
| Host city | Sending country | Mission | Ref. |
|---|---|---|---|
| Gaborone | United Arab Emirates | Embassy | |

== See also ==
- Foreign relations of Botswana
- List of diplomatic missions of Botswana
