= Botswana–Oman relations =

Bilateral relations

- Botswana: Oman

Botswana–Oman relations are the bilateral relations between Botswana and Oman. Both nations are members of the Non-Aligned Movement, World Trade Organization and the United Nations.

== History ==
On 14 October 2025, the governments of Botswana and Oman signed a joint statement in New York City to establish diplomatic relations, enhancing the cooperation and friendship between the nations. The agreement was signed by Ambassadors Charles Masole for Botswana and Omar Alkathiri for Oman.

Following the establishment of ties, President Duma Boko of Botswana discussed investment opportunities during a state visit to Oman, focusing on sectors like clean energy, mining, logistics, and food industries. His visit aimed to enhance cooperation and capabilities, particularly in sustainable investment and the management of a sovereign wealth fund. Accompanied by a high-level delegation, President Boko emphasized the importance of the partnership and noted previous meetings leading to a signed Memorandum of Understanding between the two nations.

On 6 January 2026, Sheikh Khalid Almuslahi, Undersecretary at Oman's Foreign Ministry, met with Thuso Godson Ramodimoosi, Permanent Secretary from Botswana's Ministry of International Relations. The discussion focused on strengthening economic, diplomatic, and cultural ties and exploring cooperation in energy, mining, tourism, and food security sectors, with officials from both nations present.

On 13 April 2026, Omani Sultan Haitham bin Tariq welcomed President Duma Boko at Al Baraka Palace during his working visit to Oman. The two leaders on enhancing cooperation between the two nations in various fields. President Boko secured several agreements with Oman regarding mineral exploration, oil storage infrastructure, and renewable power, aimed at enhancing economic relations. He also announced plans for Botswana to open an embassy in Muscat and initiatives including direct flights from Muscat to Gaborone.

== Power Purchase Agreement ==
On 16 April 2026, Botswana celebrated a significant milestone in its energy transformation with the groundbreaking of the 500MW Maun Solar PV Plant and a 500MWh Battery Energy Storage System . President Duma Boko highlighted this project as a shift from planning to execution, aiming to boost renewable energy's share in the national grid to 50% by 2030. Developed through a partnership with Oman, the project aims to stabilize the grid and enhance energy security while reducing carbon emissions and reliance on costly imports. Additionally, it serves as a foundational effort in Botswana-Oman cooperation in the energy sector, targeting up to 3000MW capacity in future projects, with expectations to more than double Botswana's power generation capacity upon completion.

== Trade ==
In 2023, Botswana's exports to Oman reached $906, mainly consisting of Computers ($896), Letter Stock ($5), and Processed Hair ($5). This represented a remarkable 107% annual growth from $24 in 2018. Conversely, Oman exported $259 thousand to Botswana, predominantly Non-fillet Frozen Fish ($116 thousand), Other Furniture ($79.6 thousand), and Refined Petroleum ($31 thousand), with an annual increase of 11.1% from $153 thousand in 2018.

== See also ==
- Foreign relations of Botswana
- Foreign relations of Oman
