= Zimbabweans in Botswana =

Total population
- 40,000

Regions with significant populations
- Gaborone; Francistown; Lobatse

Languages
- English; Shona

There is a significant population of Zimbabweans in Botswana.

== Numbers and distribution ==
Economic and political problems in Zimbabwe have led to significant increases in migration to Botswana since the early 2000s. By 2003, it was estimated that there were 40,000 Zimbabwean migrants in the country, of whom only one-third were resident legally. Many reside in the Ledumadumane suburb of the capital Gaborone. There is also a camp for Zimbabwean refugees at Dukwe.

== Migration ==
The number of Zimbabwean migrants in Botswana was estimated at between forty and one hundred thousand as of 2009. In 2012, Botswana deported 17,402 undocumented Zimbabweans, while in 2013 it had already deported 22,675 in the first ten months of the year.

The growth of migration, legal and illegal, has produced various tensions between the governments of Botswana and Zimbabwe, with Paul Mangwana even threatening to expel all Botswana nationals from Zimbabwe in response to the alleged poor treatment which Zimbabweans face in Botswana. Botswana claims to have deported 26,717 Zimbabweans residing in the country illegally in 2002. Beginning the following year, they also began to build an electrified fence along their boundary with Zimbabwe. Botswana's agricultural officials assert that the main purpose of the fence is to stop animal rather than human migration, with the aim of preventing the transmission of foot-and-mouth disease, but Zimbabwe's high commissioner in Gaborone rejects this explanation, calling it an attempt to make Zimbabwe into a "Gaza Strip". One survey found a support rate of 63% for the fence.

Human rights abuses faced by Zimbabweans in Botswana have also become the subject of a play entitled "Voice of the People", with actors from both countries.

== Employment ==
Zimbabweans are the most numerous nationality among registered foreign workers in Botswana. More than half of Zimbabwean migrant workers are employed in mining and agricultural occupations, while others work in construction, real estate, retail, education, hospitality, health and manufacturing. As a result, a disproportionate number of Zimbabweans form part of Botswana's skilled workers, making them a great asset to the economy. Others, especially the more irregular migrants, are engaged as maids, herders or in cross-border trading, with female migrants facing the risk of being exploited as maids or sex workers.

== See also ==
- Chinese people in Botswana
- Indians in Botswana
