= Botswana–China relations =

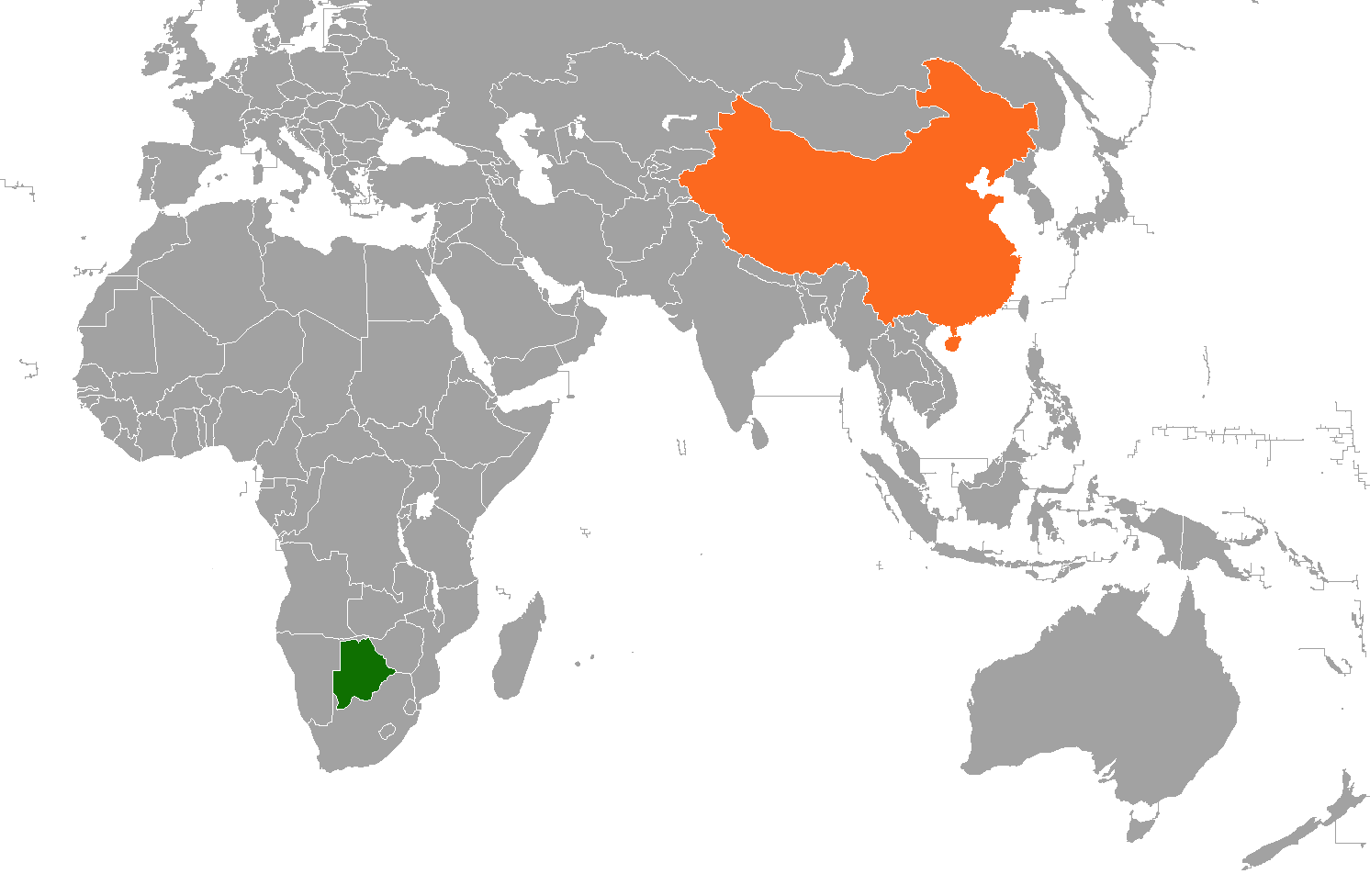
- Botswana: China

Botswana–China relations refers to the current and historical relationship between the Botswana and the People's Republic of China. Relations were first established on 6 January 1975. In 2010, upon the 35th anniversary of relations being formalized, the relationship between the two states was considered "strong" and "rapidly growing" by then Chinese ambassador to Botswana, Liu Huanxing. Botswana follows the One China Policy which means Botswana does not have relations with the Republic of China (Taiwan). Following the 2008 Sichuan earthquake in China, the Botswana government donated one million pula.

== Economic relations ==
Beginning in the 1980s, economic and commercial relations expanded rapidly between the two countries. In 2008, the total trade volume between Botswana and China was nearly 360 million US dollars. From January–October 2009, trade volume still totaled 193 million in 10 months despite the Great Recession. In February 2009, Chinese officials urged Botswana to further expand economic relations, specifically in Botswana's crucial diamond industry, citing growing Chinese demand for diamonds in the face of lessening demand in the other large economies.

Botswana joined the Belt and Road Initiative (BRI) in 2021.

=== Chinese Development Finance ===
Since the first Forum on China Africa Cooperation in 2000, the Chinese government has successfully delivered $129 million in development finance to Botswana. Of that total, only $52 million falls under the OECD-DAC criteria for Official Development Assistance. The Exim Bank of China provided the rest of the financing to Botswana to fund the Lethlhakeng-Kang road project. China has extended a loan to fund the construction of the Mosetse-Kazungula railway project, which will connect to Zambia via the Kazungula Bridge.

In September 2018, China cancelled a debt of 80 million pula owed by Botswana.

In order to facilitate economic expansion, PR China has financed a number of building projects across Botswana. These projects numbered 28 in January 2010 and included railway and roads, health facilities and low-cost housing.

== Cultural relations ==
China helped to form the Confucius Institute at the University of Botswana, which opened in September 2009. The Institute promotes Chinese culture, history and language at the university. A growing number of Botswana citizens have traveled to China; in 2005, 400 citizens visited the country, while in 2008, 1,400 did so.

== Political relations ==
Botswana follows the one China principle. It recognizes the People's Republic of China as the sole government of China and Taiwan as an integral part of China's territory, and supports all efforts by the PRC to "achieve national reunification". It also considers Hong Kong, Xinjiang and Tibet to be China's internal affairs.

== See also ==
- Foreign relations of Botswana
- Foreign relations of China
