= Botswana–India relations =

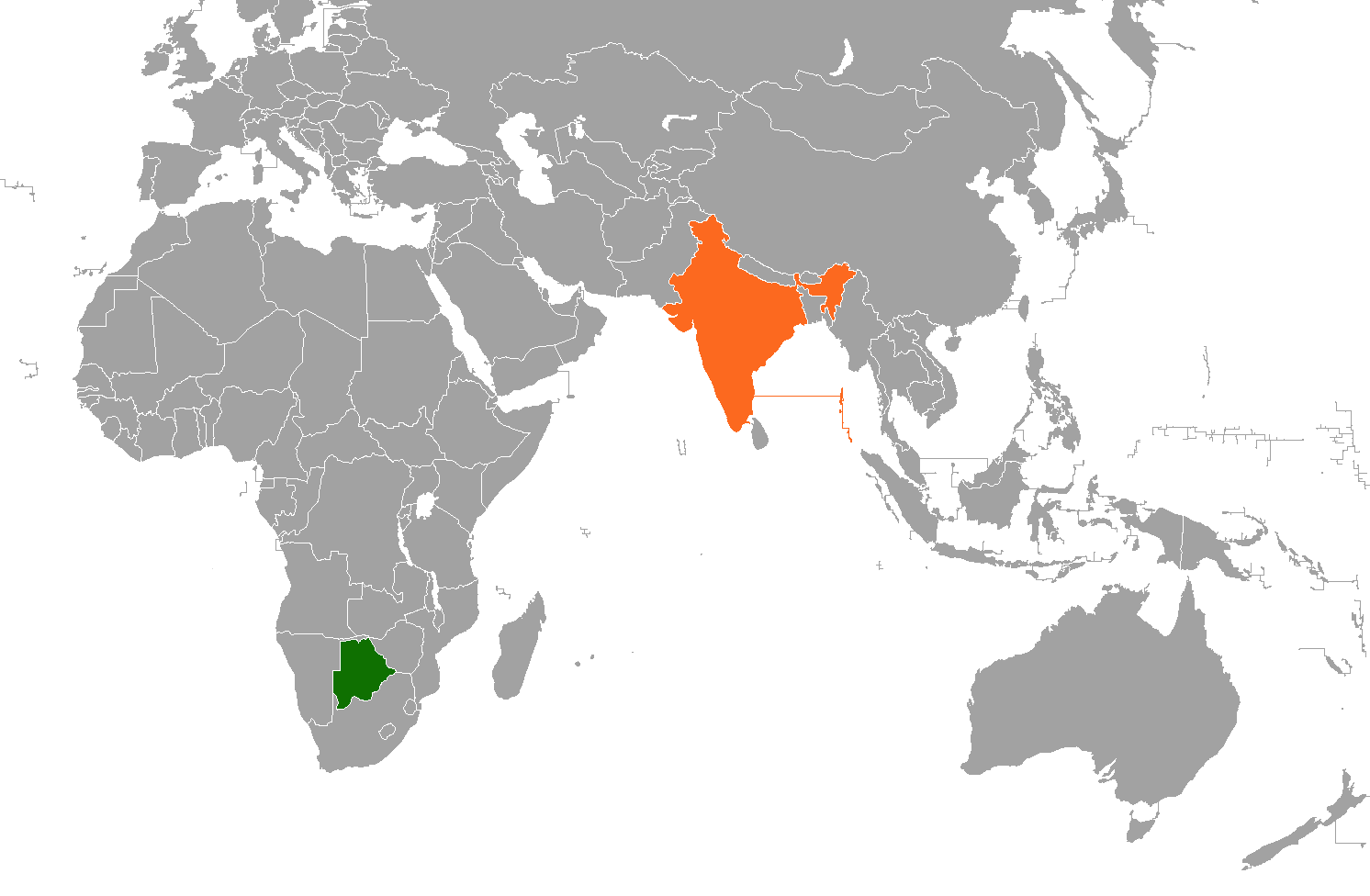
- Botswana: India

India recognized Botswana shortly after the latter's independence in 1966, and opened an embassy in Gaborone in 1987. Botswana opened its embassy in New Delhi in 2006.

Botswana President Festus Mogae has visited India twice in May 2005 and December 2006. During the second visit, India agreed to provide a line of credit of US$20 million and a grant-in-aid of ₹50 million to develop Botswana's health and education sectors respectively.

The two nations have signed several agreements related to bilateral trade, taxation, cultural exchanges, and science and technology. Botswana is also a part of India's Pan African E-Network Project. In September 2014, the two sides concluded an agreement under which the Indian Army will provide training to the Botswana Defence Forces.

Citizens of Botswana are eligible for scholarships under the Indian Technical and Economic Cooperation Programme and the Indian Council for Cultural Relations.

== Economic relations ==
Bilateral trade between Botswana and India totaled US$1.1 billion in 2014–15. The primary commodity imported by India from Botswana is diamonds. The major commodities exported by India to Botswana are items manufactured goods, metals, machinery and equipment, cotton yarn, fabrics, ready-made garments, pharmaceuticals, and transport equipment.

Botswana's large reserves of diamonds are of great interest to the Indian diamond industry, particularly in Surat. Surat is a major centre for cutting and polishing of rough diamonds. Indian firms Shrenuj, Blue Star and KGK Diamonds have offices and factories in Botswana. In 2008, the Indian Diamond Institute signed an agreement with the Government of Botswana to establish an India-Africa Diamond Institute in the country. The institute will be staffed with Indian faculty who will teach courses on diamond cutting, polishing and grading along with jewellery manufacturing.

Jindal Steel & Power Limited (JSPL) acquired Canadian-firm CIC Energy which is involved in coal mining and power production in Botswana. JSPL intends to establish two 300 MW coal power plants in the Mamambula coal blocks areas where huge coal deposits have been found.

Botswana opened a trade office called the Botswana Export Development and Investment Authority (BEDIA) in Mumbai in 2010. The office was subsequently renamed the Botswana Investment and Trade Centre (BITC). Following a meeting between BITC and CII in July 2010, Botswana's Assistant Minister of Trade and Industry Maxwell Motowane declared "Botswana has found the Indian business environment compatible and seeks to benefit from expertise in areas such as information technology, health care, transport and education."

The Bank of Baroda began operating in Botswana in 2001. Bank of India opened its first branch in the country in Gaborone on 9 August 2013, and the State Bank of India opened a branch in the same city on 26 November 2013.

== Indians in Botswana ==
As of 2016, an estimated 7,000-8,000 residents of Botswana are of Indian origin, of which 3,000-4,000 are citizens of Botswana. Most Indians are employed in the retail, manufacturing, teaching and accounting professions. Indian emigrants to Botswana primarily come from the states of Gujarat, Kerala, Andhra Pradesh and Tamil Nadu.

While no person of Indian origin has so far won any election to the Parliament of Botswana, one has become a nominated member.

== Diplomatic missions ==
The High Commission of India in Gaborone is the diplomatic mission of the Republic of India to Botswana. It is headed by the High Commissioner of India to Botswana. The current High Commissioner is Rajesh Ranjan, who succeeded Madhava Chandra.

== See also ==
- Foreign relations of Botswana
- Foreign relations of India
- Hinduism in Botswana
