= Foreign relations of Botswana =

Botswana has put a premium on economic and political integration in southern Africa. It has sought to make the Southern African Development Community (SADC) a working vehicle for economic development, and it has promoted efforts to make the region self-policing in terms of preventive diplomacy, conflict resolution, and good governance.

== Diplomatic relations ==
List of countries which Botswana maintains diplomatic relations with:

#	Country	Date
1	United Kingdom	30 September 1966
2	Japan	30 September 1966
3	United States	30 September 1966
4	Germany	1 October 1966
5	Zambia	28 November 1966
6	France	2 February 1967
7	Philippines	6 February 1967
8	Israel	24 May 1967
9	Malawi	1 July 1967
10	Netherlands	10 August 1967
11	Switzerland	22 August 1967
12	Ethiopia	19 October 1967
13	Kenya	30 October 1967
14	Norway	30 November 1967
15	Sweden	21 March 1968
16	Denmark	18 April 1968
17	South Korea	18 April 1968
18	Austria	5 December 1968
19	Canada	19 December 1968
20	Nigeria	24 February 1970
21	Czech Republic	2 March 1970
22	Russia	17 March 1970
23	Serbia	5 September 1970
24	Italy	1970
25	Romania	7 October 1971
26	Belgium	9 November 1971
27	Tanzania	29 November 1971
28	India	5 December 1972
29	Egypt	7 March 1973
30	Lesotho	April 1973
31	Australia	9 July 1973
—	North Korea (suspended)	27 December 1974
32	China	6 January 1975
33	Ghana	28 October 1975
34	Guyana	28 October 1975
35	Mexico	5 December 1975
36	Mozambique	1975
37	Eswatini	20 May 1976
38	Libya	14 March 1977
39	Luxembourg	30 September 1977
40	Cuba	9 December 1977
41	Argentina	28 March 1978
42	Greece	10 April 1978
43	Finland	1 July 1978
44	Poland	22 November 1978
45	Algeria	30 November 1979
46	Angola	7 March 1980
47	Portugal	21 April 1980
48	Hungary	30 April 1980
49	Turkey	20 January 1981
50	Spain	29 April 1981
51	Jamaica	4 May 1982
52	Bulgaria	16 August 1982
53	Albania	30 August 1982
54	Zimbabwe	31 May 1983
55	Bangladesh	21 June 1983
56	Brazil	26 September 1985
57	Thailand	29 November 1985
58	Iraq	10 July 1986
59	Pakistan	20 August 1986
60	New Zealand	1987
61	Seychelles	30 September 1988
62	Iran	September 1988
63	Vanuatu	1 November 1988
64	Uganda	9 March 1989
65	Colombia	25 April 1989
66	Somalia	15 March 1990
67	Iceland	5 April 1990
68	Namibia	26 July 1990
69	Malaysia	26 November 1990
70	Tunisia	11 November 1992
71	Singapore	30 August 1993
72	South Africa	22 June 1994
73	Kuwait	10 June 1996
74	Ireland	1996
75	Chile	13 October 1997
76	Trinidad and Tobago	11 May 1998
77	Slovakia	29 March 2001
78	Mauritius	11 April 2002
79	Latvia	17 March 2003
80	Estonia	3 June 2003
81	Lithuania	17 February 2004
82	Ukraine	4 March 2004
83	Rwanda	September 2004
84	Malta	6 January 2005
85	Cyprus	22 February 2005
86	Morocco	27 June 2005
87	Slovenia	20 July 2005
88	Madagascar	August 2005
89	Croatia	9 September 2005
90	Belarus	15 March 2006
91	United Arab Emirates	28 April 2006
92	Bahamas	May 2006
93	Dominican Republic	6 October 2006
94	Republic of the Congo	9 November 2006
95	Qatar	20 November 2006
96	Barbados	20 December 2006
97	Gabon	21 December 2006
98	Niger	21 December 2006
99	Sudan	10 January 2007
100	Burkina Faso	12 January 2007
101	Benin	21 February 2007
102	Saint Vincent and the Grenadines	22 February 2007
103	Saudi Arabia	1 March 2007
104	Burundi	13 March 2007
105	Djibouti	14 March 2007
106	Guinea	20 April 2007
107	Uruguay	4 May 2007
108	Guatemala	7 May 2007
109	Mauritania	9 May 2007
110	Ecuador	4 June 2007
111	Mali	5 June 2007
112	Ivory Coast	6 June 2007
113	Venezuela	9 July 2007
114	Paraguay	16 July 2007
115	Honduras	19 July 2007
116	Dominica	23 July 2007
117	Nicaragua	28 August 2007
118	Costa Rica	11 September 2007
119	Antigua and Barbuda	6 December 2007
120	Suriname	6 December 2007
121	Belize	28 February 2008
122	Bosnia and Herzegovina	15 September 2008
123	Sri Lanka	27 October 2008
—	Holy See	4 November 2008
124	Nepal	8 January 2009
125	Vietnam	11 February 2009
126	Saint Kitts and Nevis	25 June 2009
127	North Macedonia	4 September 2009
128	Panama	15 December 2009
129	Georgia	15 January 2010
130	Samoa	18 March 2010
131	Guinea-Bissau	22 March 2010
132	Montenegro	16 July 2010
133	Liberia	21 September 2010
134	Solomon Islands	18 November 2010
135	Papua New Guinea	2010
136	Monaco	24 February 2011
137	Fiji	28 June 2011
138	South Sudan	9 July 2011
139	Indonesia	28 March 2012
140	Chad	9 February 2015
141	Sierra Leone	16 February 2015
142	Senegal	16 March 2015
—	State of Palestine	8 March 2017
—	Sahrawi Arab Democratic Republic	31 May 2018
143	Comoros	26 September 2018
144	Togo	18 March 2021
145	Central African Republic	18 October 2021
146	Democratic Republic of the Congo	9 February 2023
147	Mongolia	6 December 2023
148	Saint Lucia	6 December 2023
149	Tajikistan	6 December 2023
150	Laos	11 December 2023
151	Maldives	11 December 2023
152	Armenia	14 December 2023
153	Gambia	13 February 2024
154	Bolivia	1 August 2024
155	Uzbekistan	26 September 2024
156	Kyrgyzstan	5 March 2025
157	Oman	14 October 2025
158	Turkmenistan	20 October 2025
159	Kazakhstan	30 October 2025
160	Azerbaijan	11 November 2025
161	Cape Verde	25 February 2026
162	El Salvador	25 March 2026
163	Moldova	25 March 2026
164	Bahrain	25 June 2026
165	Liechtenstein	11 August 2026
166	Equatorial Guinea	19 August 2026
167	Andorra	26 August 2026

== Bilateral relations ==
Country	Formal relations began	Notes
Australia	1973	Australia is accredited to Botswana from its high commission in Pretoria, South Africa, with an honorary consul in Gaborone.; Botswana has a high commission in Canberra and a consulate in Kendall
China	6 January 1975	Both countries established diplomatic relations on 6 January 1975 See Botswana–China relations: Botswana has an embassy in Beijing.; China has an embassy in Gaborone.
Greece	10 April 1978	Both countries established diplomatic relations on 10 April 1978: Botswana is accredited to Greece from its Permanent Representation to the United Nation Office in Geneva, Switzerland.; Greece is accredited to Botswana from its embassy in Pretoria, South Africa.
India	17 January 1972	See Botswana–India relations: Botswana has a high commission in New Delhi.; India has a high commission in Gaborone.
Indonesia	28 March 2012	Both countries established diplomatic relations on 28 March 2012: Botswana is accredited to Indonesia from its high commission in Canberra, Australia.; Indonesia is accredited to Botswana from its embassy in Pretoria, South Africa.
Israel		See Botswana–Israel relations: Botswana is accredited to Israel from its high commission London, United Kingdom.; Israel is accredited to Botswana from its embassy in Pretoria, South Africa.
Kenya	30 October 1967	See Botswana–Kenya relations: Botswana has a high commission in Nairobi.; Kenya has a high commission in Gaborone.
Mexico	5 December 1975	Both countries established diplomatic relations on 5 December 1975: Botswana is accredited to Mexico from its embassy in Washington, D.C., United States and maintains an honorary consulate in Mexico City.; Mexico is accredited to Botswana from its embassy in Pretoria, South Africa.
Namibia	11 September 1990	See Botswana–Namibia relations Botswana–Namibia relations are friendly, with the two neighbouring countries cooperating on economic development. Botswana gained independence from Britain in September 1966. Namibia gained independence from South Africa in 1990 following the South African Border War.: Botswana has a high commission in Windhoek.; Namibia has a high commission in Gaborone.
North Korea	27 December 1974, but severs 19 February 2014	See Botswana–North Korea relations
Oman	14 October 2025	See Botswana–Oman relations Both countries established diplomatic relations on 14 October 2025: On 13 April 2026, President Duma Boko secured agreements with Oman regarding mineral exploration, oil storage infrastructure, and renewable power.; Botswana has announced plans to open an embassy in Muscat.
Russia	6 March 1970	See Botswana–Russia relations Botswana and the Soviet Union initiated diplomatic relations on 6 March 1970. Despite its pro-Western orientation, Botswana participated in the 1980 Summer Olympics. The present-day relations between the two countries are described as friendly and long standing. In March, the two countries also celebrated the 35th anniversary of establishing diplomatic relations. According to the minister of Foreign Affairs, Russia was one of the first countries to establish full diplomatic relations with Botswana. Trade and economic cooperation between Russia and Botswana are stipulated by the Trade Agreement of 1987 and the Agreement on Economic and Technical Cooperation of 1988. The Government of the Russian Federation and the Government of the Republic of Botswana signed the Agreement on Cultural, Scientific and Educational Cooperation in September 1999. Russia and Botswana have had fruitful cooperation in a variety of fields, particularly in human resource development. Russia is still offering more educational scholarships in key sectors such as health, which is currently experiencing a critical shortage of manpower. Botswana also is one of the countries where Russian citizens do not require a visa. Russia has an embassy in Gaborone, while Botswana covers Russia from its embassy in Stockholm (Sweden) and an honorary consulate in Moscow.
South Africa	22 June 1994	Both countries established diplomatic relations on 22 June 1994 See Botswana–South Africa relations: Botswana has a high commission in Pretoria and consulates-general in Cape Town and Johannesburg.; South Africa has a high commission in Gaborone
South Korea	18 April 1968	The establishment of diplomatic relations between the Republic of Korea and the Republic of Botswana began on 18 April 1968. In 2011 the number of South Koreans living in Botswana amounted to 163. Since 2014, the government of Botswana recognized ROK as the sole legitimate government of Korea.
Turkey	20 January 1981	Permanent Representation of Botswana in the UN Geneva Office is also accredited to Turkey.; Turkey has an embassy in Gaborone; Trade volume between the two countries was US$2.9 million in 2019.
United Kingdom	30 September 1966	See Botswana–United Kingdom relations Foreign Secretary William Hague in Botswana, February 2012. Botswana established diplomatic relations with the United Kingdom on 30 September 1966.: Botswana maintains a high commission in London.; The United Kingdom is accredited to Botswana through its high commission in Gaborone.; The UK governed Botswana from 1885 to 1966, when it achieved full independence. Both countries share common membership of the Commonwealth, the International Criminal Court, and the World Trade Organization, as well as the SACUM–UK Economic Partnership Agreement. Bilaterally the two countries have a Double Tax Convention.
United States	30 September 1966	See Botswana–United States relations Embassy of Botswana in Washington, D.C. The United States considers Botswana an advocate of and a model for stability in Africa and has been a major partner in Botswana's development since its independence. The U.S. Peace Corps returned to Botswana in August 2002 with a focus on HIV/AIDS-related programs after concluding 30 years of more broadly targeted assistance in 1997. Similarly, the USAID phased out a long-standing bilateral partnership with Botswana in 1996, after successful programs emphasizing education, training, entrepreneurship, environmental management, and reproductive health. Botswana, however, continues to benefit along with its neighbours in the region from USAID's Initiative for Southern Africa, now based in Pretoria, and USAID's Southern Africa Global Competitiveness Hub, headquartered in Gaborone. The United States International Board of Broadcasters (IBB) operates a major Voice of America (VOA) relay station in Botswana serving most of the African continent. In 1995, the Centers for Disease Control (CDC) started the BOTUSA Project in collaboration with the Botswana Ministry of Health in order to generate information to improve tuberculosis control efforts in Botswana and elsewhere in the face of the TB and HIV/AIDS co-epidemics. Under the 1999 U.S. Government's Leadership and Investment in Fighting an Epidemic (LIFE) Initiative, CDC through the BOTUSA Project has undertaken many projects and has assisted many organizations in the fight against the HIV/AIDS epidemic in Botswana. Botswana is one of the 15 focus countries for PEPFAR, the President's Emergency Plan for Aids Relief, and has received more than $230 million since the program began in January 2004 through September 2007. PEPFAR assistance to Botswana, which totalled $76.2 million in FY 2007, is contributing to HIV/AIDS prevention, treatment, and care interventions. The Governments of Botswana and the United States entered into an agreement in July 2000 to establish an International Law Enforcement Academy (ILEA) in Gaborone. The academy, jointly financed, managed and staffed by the two nations, provides training to police and government officials from across the Sub-Saharan region. The academy's permanent campus, in Otse outside of Gaborone, opened March 2003. Over 3,000 law enforcement professionals from Sub-Saharan Africa have received training from ILEA since it began offering classes in 2001.: Botswana has an embassy in Washington, D.C.; United States has an embassy in Gaborone.
Zimbabwe	31 May 1983	See Botswana–Zimbabwe relations Both countries established diplomatic relations on 31 May 1983. Botswana still struggles to seal its border from thousands of Zimbabweans who flee economic collapse and political persecution. In 2015, 22,000 Zimbabweans were arrested and deported. The deportations rose to nearly 29,000 in 2018.: Botswana has an embassy in Harare.; Zimbabwe has an embassy in Gaborone.

== Botswana and FOSS ==
Botswana has been a member of the Forum of Small States (FOSS) since the group's founding in 1992.

== See also ==
- List of diplomatic missions in Botswana
- List of diplomatic missions of Botswana
