= Court of Appeal (Botswana) =

Highest court of appeal in Botswana

- Coat of arms of Botswana
- Established: 1966
- Jurisdiction: Botswana
- Location: Gaborone
- Website: www.justice.gov.bw

The Court of Appeal is the highest court of appeal in Botswana. It is based in Gaborone and hears appeals from the High Court and the Industrial Court. It is headed by the President of the Court of Appeal.

== History ==
Bechuanaland Protectorate was a British protectorate established in 1885, which became the Republic of Botswana in 1966. The Protectorate's legal system was heavily influenced by Roman-Dutch law, inherited through the Cape Colony. Additionally, English common law also shaped the system, particularly in relation to criminal and evidence law. Customary law existed alongside colonial statutes but it lacked formal recognition until later.

Appeals from courts in Bechauanaland were directly made to the Privy Council. It was modeled after the Supreme Court of South Africa. In 1954, a court of appeal was established for appeals from Botswana, Lesotho, and Swaziland. In 1966, the Constitution of Botswana established the Court of Appeal.

The final appeals to the Privy Council from the Court were continued till 1973. Once the Privy Council's jurisdiction was curtailed, the Court became the final court of appeal in Botswana.

== Judges ==
The Court of Appeal is presided by the President of the Court of Appeal. In addition to the President, the Court consists of the Chief Justice of Botswana (when not acting as the President ex officio), other judges of the High Court, and Justices of Appeal. As of December 2024, there were eight judges on the Court of Appeal.

== Notable cases ==
- Attorney General of Botswana v. Unity Dow (1992)
