= Lentsweletau-Lephephe =

Parliamentary constituency in Botswana

- Single-member constituency for the National Assembly
- District: Kweneng
- Population: 43,728
- Electorate: 18,893
- Major settlements: Lentsweletau; Kopong; Lephephe
- Area: 5,628 km^{2}

Current constituency
- Created: 2004
- Party: UDC
- MP: Tshenolo Bogatsu
- Margin of victory: 1,116 (7.3 pp)

Lentsweletau-Lephephe is a constituency in the Kweneng District represented by Tshenolo Bogatsu, a UDC Member of Parliament in the National Assembly of Botswana since 2024.

== Constituency profile ==
Lentsweletau-Lephephe was created ahead of the 2004 general election. It was first contested as Kweneng East in 2004 and 2009, before being contested as Lentsweletau-Mmopane at the 2014 and 2019 general elections. Following the 2022 delimitation process, the constituency was renamed Lentsweletau-Lephephe and was first contested under its current name at the 2024 general election.

The constituency covers a broad rural and semi-rural area in eastern Kweneng District, anchored by Lentsweletau, Kopong and Lephephe. Its boundaries link villages historically associated with the Lentsweletau-Mmopane constituency with localities formerly grouped with Letlhakeng-Lephephe.

The constituency has the following localities:

1. Lentsweletau
2. Kopong
3. Lephephe
4. Loologane
5. Boatlaname
6. Shadishadi
7. Sojwe
8. Medie
9. Ditshukudu
10. Kgope
11. Mmatseta
12. Dikgatlhong
13. Kweneng
14. Ramankhung
15. Gakuto

== Members of Parliament ==
Key: BDP UDC

Election	Winner
2004 election	Moeng Pheto
2009 election	Moeng Pheto
2014 election	Vincent Seretse
2019 election	Wilhemina Makwinja
2024 election	Tshenolo Bogatsu

== Election results ==
=== 2024 election ===
General election 2024: Lentsweletau-Lephephe
Party	Candidate	Votes	%	±%
UDC	Tshenolo Bogatsu	6,555	42.88	+12.94
BDP	Legojane Kebaitse	5,439	35.58	−29.71
BPF	Phagenyane Phage	1,720	11.25	N/A
BCP	Agisanyang Ramotswai	1,283	8.39	N/A
Independent	Thusego Fish	166	1.09	N/A
BRP	Judith Gobodiwang	125	0.82	N/A
Margin of victory		1,116	7.30	N/A
Total valid votes		15,288	98.30	−0.82
Rejected ballots		264	1.70	+0.82
Turnout		15,552	82.32	−1.64
Registered electors		18,893		
UDC gain from BDP		Swing	+21.32	

=== 2019 election ===
General election 2019: Lentsweletau-Mmopane
Party	Candidate	Votes	%	±%
BDP	Wilhemina Makwinja	11,600	65.28	+21.67
UDC	Olebogeng Watshipi	5,320	29.94	+11.70
AP	Godwin Samuel	716	4.03	N/A
BMD	Lucky Tshireletso	133	0.75	N/A
Margin of victory		6,280	35.34	+10.89
Total valid votes		17,769	99.12	+0.29
Rejected ballots		158	0.88	−0.29
Turnout		17,927	83.96	−1.56
Registered electors		21,352		
BDP hold		Swing	+4.98	

=== 2014 election ===
General election 2014: Lentsweletau-Mmopane
Party	Candidate	Votes	%	±%
BDP	Vincent Seretse	7,170	43.62	−19.49
BCP	Phagenyane Phage	3,150	19.16	+3.36
Independent	Moeng Pheto	3,120	18.98	N/A
UDC	Godisang Bwire	2,999	18.24	−1.47
Margin of victory		4,020	24.45	−18.93
Total valid votes		16,439	98.83	+1.63
Rejected ballots		194	1.17	−1.63
Turnout		16,633	85.52	+9.84
Registered electors		19,450		
BDP hold		Swing	−11.42	

=== 2009 election ===
General election 2009: Kweneng East
Party	Candidate	Votes	%	±%
BDP	Moeng Pheto	6,018	63.10	+4.41
BNF	Segakisa Phoi	1,880	19.71	−4.08
BCP	William Motube	1,507	15.80	−0.94
MELS	Kaone Pebe	132	1.38	+0.62
Margin of victory		4,138	43.39	+8.49
Total valid votes		9,537	97.21	−2.03
Rejected ballots		274	2.79	+2.03
Turnout		9,811	75.67	−0.07
Registered electors		12,965		
BDP hold		Swing	+4.25	

=== 2004 election ===
General election 2004: Kweneng East
Party	Candidate	Votes	%
BDP	Moeng Pheto	4,686	58.69
BNF	Pretty Molefhe	1,900	23.80
BCP	Michael Seithiro	1,337	16.75
MELS	Kaone Pebe	61	0.76
Margin of victory		2,786	34.89
Total valid votes		7,984	99.24
Rejected ballots		61	0.76
Turnout		8,045	75.75
Registered electors		10,621	
BDP win (new seat)			
