= 9th Parliament of Botswana =

2004–2009 legislative meeting

The 9th Parliament of Botswana was the meeting of the National Assembly of Botswana from 2004 to 2009. It had fifty-seven standard members, four specially elected members, and two ex officio members. Its members were chosen in the 2004 Botswana general election.

== Members ==
The following members were elected during the 2004 Botswana general election.

Constituency	Member	Party
President	Festus Mogae	Botswana Democratic Party
Speaker	P. K. Balopi	Botswana Democratic Party
Bobirwa	Shaw Kgathi	Botswana Democratic Party
Barolong	Onkokame Kitso Mokaila	Botswana Democratic Party
Boteti North	Slumber Tsogwane	Botswana Democratic Party
Boteti South	Lebonamang T. Mokalake	Botswana Democratic Party
Chobe	Duncan Mlazie	Botswana Democratic Party
Francistown East	Phandu T. C. Skelemani	Botswana Democratic Party
Francistown South	Khumo T. Maoto	Botswana Democratic Party
Francistown West	Tshelang Masisi	Botswana Democratic Party
Gaborone Central	Dumelang Saleshando	Botswana Congress Party
Gaborone North	Keletso Joseph Rakhudu	Botswana Democratic Party
Gaborone South	Akanyang Magama	Botswana National Front
	Paul Mmolotsi Rantao	Botswana National Front
Gaborone West North	Odirile Motlhale	Botswana Democratic Party
	Otsweletse Moupo	Botswana National Front
Gaborone West South	Robert K. Molefhabangwe	Botswana National Front
Gantsi North	Johnnie Keemenao Swartz	Botswana Democratic Party
Gantsi South	Christian de Graaff	Botswana Democratic Party
Kanye North	Calvin M. K. Batsile	Botswana National Front
Kanye South	Omphitlhetse O. Maswabi	Botswana National Front
Kgalagadi North	Obakeng E. Moumakwa	Botswana National Front
Kgalagadi South	Daniel Neo Morka	Botswana Democratic Party
Kgatleng East	Isaac Steven Mabiletsa	Botswana National Front
Kgatleng West	Rakwadi John Modipane	Botswana Democratic Party
Kweneng East	Moeng R. Pheto	Botswana Democratic Party
Kweneng South	Gladys K. Theresa Kokorwe	Botswana Democratic Party
Kweneng South East	Edward Mmoloki Raletobana	Botswana Democratic Party
Letlhakeng East	Gordon Mokgwathi	Botswana National Front
Letlhakeng West	Filbert Kebopame Nagafela	Botswana National Front
Lobatse	Nehemiah Modubule	Botswana National Front
Mahalapye East	Botlogile Tshireletso	Botswana Democratic Party
Mahalapye West	Mompati Merafhe	Botswana Democratic Party
Maun East	Jack F. Ramsden	Botswana Democratic Party
Maun West	Ronald Ronnie Ridge	Botswana Democratic Party
Mmadinare	Ponatshego Kedikilwe	Botswana Democratic Party
Mogoditshane	Patrick Masimolole	Botswana Democratic Party
Molepolole North	Gaotlhaetse U. Matlhabaphiri	Botswana Democratic Party
Molepolole South	Daniel Kwelagobe	Botswana Democratic Party
Moshupa	Maitlhoko Mooka	Botswana Democratic Party
Nata/Gweta	Olifant Mfa	Botswana Democratic Party
Ngami	Jacob Dickie Nkate	Botswana Democratic Party
Ngwaketse South	Peter L. Siele	Botswana Democratic Party
Ngwaketse West	Mephato Reatile	Botswana National Front
Nkange	Ambrose Masalila	Botswana Democratic Party
Okavango	Vistor M. Moruti	Botswana Democratic Party
Palapye	Lephimotswe B. Sebetela	Botswana Democratic Party
Selebi-Phikwe East	Nonofo Ezekiel Molefhi	Botswana Democratic Party
Selebi-Phikwe West	Kavis Kario	Botswana Democratic Party
Serowe North East	Dikgakgamatso Seretse	Botswana Democratic Party
Serowe North West	Ian Khama	Botswana Democratic Party
Serowe South	Pelonomi Venson	Botswana Democratic Party
Shoshong	Gobopang Duke Lefhoko	Botswana Democratic Party
South-East North South	Olebile Gaborone	Botswana National Front
South-East South	Lesego Ethel Motsumi	Botswana Democratic Party
Tati East	Samson Moyo Guma	Botswana Democratic Party
Tati West	Mbiganyi Charles Tibone	Botswana Democratic Party
Tonota North	Baledzi Gaolathe	Botswana Democratic Party
Tonota South	Pono P. P. Moatlhodi	Botswana Democratic Party
Tswapong North	Thebe D. Mogami	Botswana Democratic Party
Tswapong South	Oreeditse Sola Molebatsi	Botswana Democratic Party
Specially elected	Margaret Nasha	
Specially elected	Sheila Tlou	
Specially elected	Moggie Mbaakanyi	
Specially elected	Botsalo Ntuane	

== See also ==
- Elections in Botswana
- Politics of Botswana
