= Moshupa-Manyana =

Parliamentary constituency in Botswana, 1965 onwards

- Single-member constituency for the National Assembly
- District: Southern District
- Population: 52,128
- Major settlements: Moshupa
- Area: 2,832 km^{2}

Current constituency
- Created: 1965
- Party: BDP
- MP: Karabo Gare
- Margin of victory: 6,865 (30.4 pp)

Moshupa-Manyana is a constituency in Botswana represented in the National Assembly of Botswana by Karabo Gare, a Botswana Democratic Party (BDP) MP and chairman of the BDP since 2018.

== Constituency profile ==
Moshupa-Manyana is a largely rural constituency situated in Botswana's south-eastern hardveld. The constituency's terrain is dotted with low granite, undulating koppies and seasonal river valleys. Most households practise mixed farming (goats, poultry and rain-fed crops) or commute to Kanye, the Jwaneng diamond mine, or Gaborone for work.

The seat, known as Moshupa until 2014, has existed in one form or another since the country's inaugural general election in 1965, making it one of Botswana's longest-standing constituencies.

Moshupa-Manyana is a stronghold of the Botswana Democratic Party (BDP).

It is one of only two existing constituencies in Botswana that have never returned a Member of Parliament from more than one party, the other being neighbouring Thamaga-Kumakwane. In every election since 1965, the BDP has always polled above 50% of the popular vote, the only constituency in the country where the BDP has done so.

Political life in the constituency has been closely associated with the Masisi family, one of Botswana's most prominent political families. Diplomat, cabinet minister and career politician Edison Masisi served as MP for three decades (1965–1999) and his son, future president Mokgweetsi Masisi, held the seat from 2009 until he assumed the presidency in 2018.

The elevation of Mokgweetsi Masisi to the presidency produced a pronounced favourite son effect: at the 2019 election the BDP vote share surged to 85 percent (up from 54 percent in 2014) which made Moshupa-Manyana the safest seat in the country, with the BDP winning the seat by a majority of 70 percentage points. This marked the first time in Botswana's electoral history that the safest constituency was not one of the constituencies anchored around the Ngwato capital of Serowe.

The 2019 landslide was also brought about due to a wider realignment triggered by President Masisi's public falling-out with former president and Ngwato Kgosi (paramount chief) Ian Khama, which led to a dramatic swing against the BDP in Khama's northern heartland but equally increased support for the party across much of the south.

Despite a strong nationwide swing against the BDP in 2024—when the party lost 34 of the 38 constituencies it had won in 2019—Moshupa-Manyana remained in BDP hands as its 2019 majority proved too insurmountable to overcome. The seat, along with Thamaga-Kumakwane, was one of only two constituencies where the BDP won with an outright majority of the vote at that election.

The largely rural constituency encompasses the following localities:

1. Moshupa
2. Manyana
3. Lotlhakane West
4. Ralekgetho
5. Pitseng
6. Seherelela
7. Sesung
8. Bikwe
9. Mogonye
10. Lekgolobotlo
11. Ranaka
12. Ntlhantlhe
13. Kgomokasitwa
14. Magotlhwane

== Members of Parliament ==
Key: BDP

Election	Winner
1965 election	Edison Masisi
1969 election	Edison Masisi
1974 election	Edison Masisi
1979 election	Edison Masisi
1984 election	Edison Masisi
1989 election	Edison Masisi
1994 election	Edison Masisi
1999 election	Maitlhoko Mooka
2004 election	Maitlhoko Mooka
2009 election	Mokgweetsi Masisi
2014 election	Mokgweetsi Masisi
2018 by-election	Karabo Gare
2019 election	Karabo Gare
2024 election	Karabo Gare

== Election results ==
=== 2024 election ===
General election 2024: Moshupa-Manyana
Party	Candidate	Votes	%	±%
BDP	Karabo Gare	13,422	59.50	−25.32
UDC	Moses Loeto	6,557	29.07	+13.89
BCP	Pako Monageng	2,578	11.43	N/A
Margin of victory		6,865	30.43	−39.21
Total valid votes		22,557	98.85	−0.42
Rejected ballots		262	1.15	+0.42
Turnout		22,819	81.90	−5.31
Registered electors		27,863		
BDP hold		Swing	−19.61	

=== 2019 election ===
General election 2019: Moshupa-Manyana
Party	Candidate	Votes	%	±%
BDP	Karabo Gare	13,924	84.82	+30.73
UDC	Ngaka Monagen	2,492	15.18	−30.73
Margin of victory		11,432	69.64	+41.13
Total valid votes		16,416	99.27	+3.58
Rejected ballots		120	0.73	−3.58
Turnout		16,536	87.21	+1.00
Registered electors		18,962		
BDP hold		Swing	+30.73	

=== 2018 by-election ===
By-election 2018: Moshupa-Manyana
Party	Candidate	Votes	%	±%
BDP	Karabo Gare	4,093	72.79	+18.70
UDC	Jonathan Sethono	1,530	27.21	−18.70
Margin of victory		2,563	45.58	+17.07
Total valid votes		5,623	98.24	+2.55
Rejected ballots		101	1.76	−2.55
Turnout		5,724	~38.49	~−47.72
BDP hold		Swing	+18.70	

Note: UDC vote share is compared to the total vote share of the UDC and BCP in 2014.

=== 2014 election ===
General election 2014: Moshupa-Manyana
Party	Candidate	Votes	%	±%
BDP	Mokgweetsi Masisi	6,831	54.09	−14.86
UDC	Ngaka Monagen	3,231	25.58	+12.39
BCP	Benny Stegling	2,567	20.33	+3.90
Margin of victory		3,600	28.51	−24.01
Total valid votes		12,629	95.69	−1.77
Rejected ballots		192	4.31	+1.77
Turnout		12,821	86.21	+9.88
Registered electors		14,872		
BDP hold		Swing	−13.63	

Note: UDC vote share is compared to the vote share of the BNF in 2009.

=== 2009 election ===
General election 2009: Moshupa
Party	Candidate	Votes	%	±%
BDP	Mokgweetsi Masisi	6,374	68.95	+2.14
BCP	Sethibe Sethibe	1,519	16.43	−1.36
BNF	Abraham Motlogelwa	1,219	13.19	−2.21
Independent	Simon Ramontsho	72	0.78	N/A
Independent	Tlhomamiso Kebaswele	60	0.65	N/A
Margin of victory		4,855	52.52	+3.50
Total valid votes		9,244	97.46	−0.22
Rejected ballots		241	2.54	+0.22
Turnout		9,485	76.33	−1.79
Registered electors		12,426		
BDP hold		Swing	+1.75	

=== 2004 election ===
General election 2004: Moshupa
Party	Candidate	Votes	%	±%
BDP	Maitlhoko Mooka	4,594	66.81	+15.00
BCP	Benny Stegling	1,223	17.79	+13.60
BNF	Boikhutso Disele	1,059	15.40	−14.94
Margin of victory		3,371	49.02	+27.55
Total valid votes		6,876	97.68	+2.01
Rejected ballots		163	2.14	−2.01
Turnout		7,039	78.12	−2.10
Registered electors		9,011		
BDP hold		Swing	+14.30	

=== 1999 election ===
General election 1999: Moshupa
Party	Candidate	Votes	%	±%
BDP	Maitlhoko Mooka	4,157	51.81	−12.27
BNF	Boikhutso Disele	2,434	30.34	−1.39
Independent	Tlhomamiso Kebaswele	909	11.33	N/A
BCP	O. Mosielele	345	4.30	N/A
BAM	Gofetile Gare	178	2.22	N/A
Margin of victory		1,723	21.47	−10.88
Total valid votes		8,023	95.67	N/A
Rejected ballots		363	4.33	N/A
Turnout		8,386	80.22	−3.43
Registered electors		10,454		
BDP hold		Swing	−5.44	

=== 1994 election ===
General election 1994: Moshupa
Party	Candidate	Votes	%	±%
BDP	Edison Masisi	4,814	64.08	−7.13
BNF	J.M. Kwelagobe	2,384	31.73	+2.94
BIP	Gofetile Gare	315	4.19	N/A
Margin of victory		2,430	32.35	−10.07
Turnout		7,513	83.65	+16.03
Registered electors		8,982		
BDP hold		Swing	−5.04	

=== 1989 election ===
General election 1989: Moshupa
Party	Candidate	Votes	%	±%
BDP	Edison Masisi	4,469	71.21	+7.24
BNF	Gofetile Gare	1,807	28.79	−7.24
Margin of victory		2,662	42.42	+14.48
Turnout		6,276	67.62	−13.08
Registered electors		9,281		
BDP hold		Swing	+7.24	

=== 1984 election ===
General election 1984: Moshupa
Party	Candidate	Votes	%	±%
BDP	Edison Masisi	4,745	63.97	−3.77
BNF	Gofetile Gare	2,672	36.03	+3.77
Margin of victory		2,073	27.94	−7.54
Turnout		7,417	80.70	+13.57
Registered electors		9,191		
BDP hold		Swing	−3.77	

=== 1979 election ===
General election 1979: Moshupa
Party	Candidate	Votes	%	±%
BDP	Edison Masisi	3,800	67.74	−7.81
BNF	Gofetile Gare	1,810	32.26	+7.81
Margin of victory		1,990	35.48	−15.62
Turnout		5,610	67.13	+19.06
Registered electors		8,357		
BDP hold		Swing	−7.81	

=== 1974 election ===
General election 1974: Moshupa
Party	Candidate	Votes	%
BDP	Edison Masisi	2,800	75.55
BNF	Gofetile Gare	906	24.45
Margin of victory		1,894	51.10
Turnout		3,706	48.07
Registered electors		7,709	
BDP hold			

=== 1969 election ===
General election 1969: Moshupa
Party	Candidate	Votes	%	±%
BDP	Edison Masisi	Walkover	N/A	N/A
BDP hold				

=== 1965 election ===
General election 1965: Moshupa
Party	Candidate	Votes	%
BDP	Edison Masisi	4,463	95.79
BIP	J. Kalane	106	2.28
BPP	M. Mosielele	90	1.93
Margin of victory		4,357	93.51
Turnout		4,659	N/A
Registered electors		N/A	
BDP win (new seat)			
