= List of female speakers of national and territorial unicameral parliaments =

This list presents female speakers of national and territorial unicameral parliaments of their respective nations or territories. Many women have been elected to parliaments around the world, starting around the first quarter of 20th century. Some of them were entrusted to take the position of Speaker of the parliament.

In government, unicameralism (Latin uni, one + camera, chamber) is the practice of having one legislative or parliamentary chamber. Thus, a unicameral parliament or unicameral legislature is a legislature which consists of one chamber or house. Unicameral legislatures typically exist in small and homogeneous unitary states, where a second chamber is considered unnecessary.

== National ==
Denotes incumbent speaker of parliament

Italics denotes an acting speaker of parliament and states that are either de facto (with limited to no international recognition) or defunct.

Name	Image	Country	Legislative Body	Mandate start	Mandate end	Term length
Erzsébet Metzker Vass		Hungary	National Assembly	21 March 1963	14 April 1967	4 years, 24 days
Soong Ching-ling		China	National People's Congress	6 July 1976	5 March 1978	1 year, 242 days
Alda Neves do Espírito Santo		São Tomé and Príncipe	National Assembly	1980	1991	11 years, 0 days
Marie Davis Pierre		Dominica	House of Assembly	13 August 1980	29 December 1988	8 years, 138 days
Maria Lea Pedini-Angelini		San Marino	Grand and General Council	1 April 1981	1 October 1981	183 days
Maria Julia Castillo Rodas		El Salvador	Legislative Assembly	1983	1985	2 years, 0 days
Gloriana Ranocchini		San Marino	Grand and General Council	1 April 1984	1 October 1984	183 days
Gloriana Ranocchini		San Marino	Grand and General Council	1 October 1989	1 April 1990	182 days
Rosemary Karspinsky Dodero		Costa Rica	Legislative Assembly	1 May 1986	1 May 1987	1 year, 0 days
Guðrún Helgadóttir		Iceland	United Althing	1 January 1988	1 January 1991	3 years, 0 days
Erna Hennicot-Schoepges		Luxembourg	Chamber of Deputies	1989	1995	6 years, 0 days
Sabine Bergmann-Pohl		East Germany	Volkskammer	5 April 1990	2 October 1990	180 days
Elmira Gafarova		Azerbaijan	National Assembly	18 May 1990	5 March 1992	1 year, 292 days
Salome Þorkelsdóttir		Iceland	Althing	1991	1995	4 years, 0 days
Ana Catalina Soberanis		Guatemala	Congress	14 January 1991	14 January 1992	1 year, 0 days
Ingegerd Troedsson		Sweden	Riksdag	30 September 1991	3 October 1994	3 years, 3 days
Edda Ceccoli		San Marino	Grand and General Council	1 October 1991	1 April 1992	183 days
Kirsti Kolle Grøndahl		Norway	Storting	1993	2001	7 years, 354 days
Patrizia Busignani		San Marino	Grand and General Council	1 April 1993	1 October 1993	183 days
Neva Edwards		Dominica	House of Assembly	1 November 1993	2 August 1995	1 year, 274 days
Balbina Herrera		Panama	National Assembly	1994	1995	1 year, 0 days
Gloria Salguero Gross		El Salvador	Legislative Assembly	1994	1997	3 years, 0 days
Riitta Uosukainen		Finland	Eduskunta	7 February 1994	23 March 1995	1 year, 44 days
Riitta Uosukainen		Finland	Eduskunta	21 April 1995	23 March 1999	3 years, 336 days
Riitta Uosukainen		Finland	Eduskunta	20 April 1999	18 March 2003	3 years, 332 days
Arabella Castro Quiñónez		Guatemala	Congress	13 September 1994	14 January 1995	123 days
Arabella Castro Quiñónez		Guatemala	Congress	14 January 1997	14 January 1998	1 year, 0 days
Birgitta Dahl		Sweden	Riksdag	3 October 1994	30 September 2002	7 years, 362 days
Martha Chávez		Peru	Congress of the Republic	27 July 1995	26 July 1996	365 days
Ilga Kreituse		Latvia	Saeima	7 November 1995	26 September 1996	324 days
Myriam Spiteri Debono		Malta	House of Representatives	September 1996	August 1998	1 year, 334 days
Marijke Djwalapersad		Suriname	National Assembly	10 October 1996	23 July 2000	3 years, 287 days
Rosa Zafferani		San Marino	Grand and General Council	1 April 1999	1 October 1999	183 days
Martha Hildebrandt		Peru	Congress of the Republic	27 July 1999	13 November 2000	1 year, 109 days
Maria Domenica Michelotti		San Marino	Grand and General Council	1 April 2000	1 October 2000	183 days
Alix Boyd Knights		Dominica	House of Assembly	17 April 2000	10 February 2020	19 years, 299 days
Rina Contreras López		Costa Rica	Legislative Assembly	1 May 2000	1 May 2001	1 year, 0 days
Susana González Muñoz		Ecuador	National Congress	10 August 2000	20 August 2001	10 days
Luz Salgado		Peru	Congress of the Republic	13 November 2000	16 November 2000	3 days
Luz Salgado		Peru	Congress of the Republic	26 July 2016	26 July 2017	1 year, 0 days
Eugenia Ostapciuc		Moldova	Parliament	20 March 2001	24 March 2005	4 years, 4 days
Vesna Perović		Montenegro	Parliament	7 June 2001	5 November 2002	1 year, 151 days
Nino Burjanadze		Georgia	Parliament	9 November 2001	7 June 2008	6 years, 211 days
Nataša Mićić		Serbia	National Assembly	6 December 2001	27 January 2004	2 years, 52 days
Katalin Szili		Hungary	National Assembly	15 May 2002	14 September 2009	7 years, 122 days
Ingrīda Ūdre		Latvia	Saeima	5 November 2002	7 November 2006	4 years, 2 days
Anneli Jäätteenmäki		Finland	Eduskunta	25 March 2003	16 April 2003	22 days
Ene Ergma		Estonia	Riigikogu	31 March 2003	23 March 2006	2 years, 357 days
Ene Ergma		Estonia	Riigikogu	2 April 2007	20 March 2014	6 years, 352 days
Liisa Jaakonsaari		Finland	Eduskunta	17 April 2003	22 April 2003	5 days
Valeria Ciavatta		San Marino	Grand and General Council	1 October 2003	1 April 2004	183 days
Valeria Ciavatta		San Marino	Grand and General Council	1 April 2014	1 October 2014	183 days
Lilijana Popovska		FYR Macedonia	Assembly of the Republic	8 November 2003	18 November 2003	10 days
Marcella Liburd		Saint Kitts and Nevis	National Assembly	2004	18 April 2008	4 years, 108 days
Fatma Ekenoğlu		Northern Cyprus	Assembly of the Republic	14 January 2004	6 May 2009	5 years, 112 days
Anna Benaki-Psarouda		Greece	Vouli	19 March 2004	18 August 2007	3 years, 152 days
Margaret Wilson		New Zealand	House of Representatives	3 March 2005	8 November 2008	3 years, 250 days
Fausta Morganti		San Marino	Grand and General Council	1 April 2005	1 October 2005	183 days
Jozefina Topalli		Albania	Parliament	3 September 2005	10 September 2013	8 years, 7 days
Dalia Itzik		Israel	Knesset	28 March 2006	10 March 2009	2 years, 347 days
Belinda Bidwell		Gambia	National Assembly	20 April 2006	5 February 2007	291 days
Mercedes Cabanillas		Peru	Congress of the Republic	27 July 2006	26 July 2007	364 days
Cilia Flores		Venezuela	National Assembly	15 August 2006	5 January 2011	4 years, 143 days
Akja Nurberdiýewa		Turkmenistan	Assembly	22 December 2006	30 March 2018	11 years, 98 days
Fatoumata Jahumpa Ceesay		Gambia	National Assembly	5 February 2007	12 November 2010	3 years, 280 days
Slavica Đukić Dejanović		Serbia	National Assembly	25 June 2008	31 May 2012	3 years, 341 days
Assunta Meloni		San Marino	Grand and General Council	1 October 2008	1 April 2009	182 days
Joyce Bamford-Addo		Ghana	Parliament	7 January 2009	6 January 2013	3 years, 365 days
Ásta Ragnheiður Jóhannesdóttir		Iceland	Althing	15 May 2009	23 May 2013	4 years, 8 days
Tsetska Tsacheva		Bulgaria	National Assembly	14 July 2009	13 March 2013	3 years, 180 days
Tsetska Tsacheva		Bulgaria	National Assembly	27 October 2014	26 January 2017	2 years, 91 days
Irena Degutienė		Lithuania	Seimas	15 September 2009	14 September 2012	2 years, 365 days
Margaret Nasha		Botswana	National Assembly	21 October 2009	12 November 2014	5 years, 22 days
Verónica Macamo		Mozambique	Assembly of the Republic	12 January 2010	13 January 2020	10 years, 1 day
Jennifer Simons		Suriname	National Assembly	30 June 2010	28 June 2020	9 years, 364 days
Solvita Āboltiņa		Latvia	Saeima	2 November 2010	4 November 2014	4 years, 2 days
Anne Makinda		Tanzania	National Assembly	12 November 2010	17 November 2015	5 years, 5 days
Pany Yathotou		Laos	National Assembly	23 December 2010	22 March 2021	10 years, 89 days
Maria Luisa Berti		San Marino	Grand and General Council	1 April 2011	1 October 2011	183 days
Maria Luisa Berti		San Marino	Grand and General Council	1 October 2022	1 April 2023	182 days
Rebecca Kadaga		Uganda	Parliament	19 May 2011	24 May 2021	10 years, 5 days
Maria da Assunção Esteves		Portugal	Assembly of the Republic	21 June 2011	23 October 2015	4 years, 124 days
Denise Bronzetti		San Marino	Grand and General Council	1 October 2012	1 April 2013	182 days
Denise Bronzetti		San Marino	Grand and General Council	1 April 2025	1 October 2025	183 days
Halimah Yacob		Singapore	Parliament	14 January 2013	7 August 2017	4 years, 205 days
Antonella Mularoni		San Marino	Grand and General Council	1 April 2013	1 October 2013	183 days
Liliana Palihovici		Moldova	Parliament	25 April 2013	30 May 2013	35 days
Shirin Sharmin Chaudhury		Bangladesh	Jatiyo Sangshad	30 April 2013	2 September 2024	11 years, 125 days
Gabriela Rivadeneira		Ecuador	National Assembly	14 May 2013	14 May 2017	4 years, 0 days
Sibel Siber		Northern Cyprus	Assembly of the Republic	4 September 2013	22 January 2018	4 years, 140 days
Anna Maria Muccioli		San Marino	Grand and General Council	1 October 2013	1 April 2014	182 days
Loreta Graužinienė		Lithuania	Seimas	3 October 2013	14 November 2016	3 years, 42 days
Maja Gojković		Serbia	National Assembly	23 April 2014	21 June 2020	6 years, 59 days
Ana María Solórzano		Peru	Congress of the Republic	26 July 2014	26 July 2015	1 year, 0 days
Jiko Luveni		Fiji	Parliament	6 October 2014	22 December 2018	4 years, 77 days
Ināra Mūrniece		Latvia	Saeima	4 November 2014	1 November 2022	7 years, 362 days
Gladys Kokorwe		Botswana	National Assembly	12 November 2014	4 November 2019	4 years, 357 days
Maya Hanoomanjee		Mauritius	National Assembly	22 December 2014	21 November 2019	4 years, 334 days
Zoe Konstantopoulou		Greece	Vouli	6 February 2015	4 October 2015	240 days
Lorena Guadalupe Peña		El Salvador	Legislative Assembly	14 May 2015	8 November 2016	1 year, 178 days
Maria Lohela		Finland	Eduskunta	29 May 2015	5 February 2018	2 years, 252 days
Pia Kjærsgaard		Denmark	Folketing	3 July 2015	21 June 2019	3 years, 353 days
Lorella Stefanelli		San Marino	Grand and General Council	1 October 2015	1 April 2016	183 days
Onsari Gharti Magar		Nepal	Legislature Parliament	16 October 2015	19 January 2018	2 years, 95 days
Amal Al Qubaisi		United Arab Emirates	Federal National Council	18 November 2015	14 November 2019	3 years, 361 days
Nguyễn Thị Kim Ngân		Vietnam	National Assembly	31 March 2016	30 March 2021	4 years, 364 days
Hadiya Khalaf Abbas		Syria	People's Council	6 June 2016	20 July 2017	1 year, 44 days
Iris Marina Blandón		Nicaragua	National Assembly	10 September 2016	9 January 2017	121 days
Unnur Brá Konráðsdóttir		Iceland	Althing	24 January 2017	28 October 2017	277 days
Mimma Zavoli		San Marino	Grand and General Council	1 April 2017	1 October 2017	183 days
Vanessa D'Ambrosio		San Marino	Grand and General Council	1 April 2017	1 October 2017	183 days
Mariam Jack-Denton		Gambia	National Assembly	11 April 2017	17 April 2022	5 years, 6 days
Yanibel Ábrego		Panama	National Assembly	1 July 2017	1 July 2018	1 year, 0 days
Valentina Leskaj		Albania	Parliament	24 July 2017	9 September 2017	47 days
Marija Ćatović		Montenegro	Parliament	7 November 2017	24 November 2017	17 days
Tsveta Karayancheva		Bulgaria	National Assembly	17 November 2017	14 April 2021	3 years, 148 days
Paula Risikko		Finland	Eduskunta	5 February 2018	16 April 2019	1 year, 70 days
Tone Wilhelmsen Trøen		Norway	Storting	15 March 2018	9 October 2021	3 years, 208 days
Elizabeth Cabezas		Ecuador	National Assembly	14 March 2018	14 May 2019	1 year, 61 days
Gülşat Mämmedowa		Turkmenistan	Assembly (Note: In 2021–2023, the Parliament of Turkmenistan was bicameral.)	30 March 2018	6 April 2023	5 years, 7 days
Yawa Djigbodi Tségan		Togo	National Assembly	23 January 2019	14 June 2024	5 years, 143 days
Carolina Hidalgo Herrera		Costa Rica	Legislative Assembly	1 May 2018	30 April 2019	364 days
Roser Suñé Pascuet		Andorra	General Council	2 May 2019	26 April 2023	3 years, 359 days
Zinaida Greceanîi		Moldova	Parliament	8 June 2019	28 April 2021	1 year, 324 days
Catherine Gotani Hara		Malawi	National Assembly	19 June 2019	5 August 2025	6 years, 47 days
Mariella Mularoni		San Marino	Grand and General Council	1 October 2019	1 April 2020	183 days
Esperança Bias		Mozambique	Assembly of the Republic	13 January 2020	13 January 2025	5 years, 0 days
Vjosa Osmani		Kosovo	Assembly of the Republic	3 February 2020	22 March 2021	1 year, 47 days
Sahiba Gafarova		Azerbaijan	National Assembly	10 March 2020	Incumbent	6 years, 255 days
Grazia Zafferani		San Marino	Grand and General Council	1 April 2020	1 October 2020	183 days
Tangariki Reete		Kiribati	House of Assembly	22 May 2020	13 September 2024	4 years, 114 days
Anu Vehviläinen		Finland	Eduskunta	9 June 2020	1 February 2022	1 year, 237 days
Smilja Tišma		Serbia	National Assembly	3 August 2020	22 October 2020	80 days
Viktorija Čmilytė-Nielsen		Lithuania	Seimas	13 November 2020	14 November 2024	4 years, 1 day
Rocío Silva-Santisteban		Peru	Congress	15 November 2020	16 November 2020	1 day
Mirtha Vásquez		Peru	Congress	17 November 2020	26 July 2021	253 days
Rochelle Forde		Saint Vincent and the Grenadines	House of Assembly	30 November 2020	23 December 2025	5 years, 23 days
Iva Miteva		Bulgaria	National Assembly	15 April 2021	11 May 2021	26 days
Iva Miteva		Bulgaria	National Assembly	21 July 2021	15 September 2021	56 days
Silvia Hernández Sánchez		Costa Rica	Legislative Assembly	1 May 2021	30 April 2022	364 days
Guadalupe Llori		Ecuador	National Assembly	15 May 2021	31 May 2022	1 year, 16 days
Annita Demetriou		Cyprus	House of Representatives	10 June 2021	Incumbent	5 years, 163 days
Elisa Loncón		Chile	Constitutional Convention	4 July 2021	5 January 2022	185 days
Maricarmen Alva		Peru	Congress	26 July 2021	26 July 2022	1 year, 0 days
Nelly Mutti		Zambia	National Assembly	3 September 2021	Incumbent	5 years, 78 days
Lindita Nikolla		Albania	Parliament	10 September 2021	30 July 2024	2 years, 324 days
Eva Kristin Hansen		Norway	Storting	9 October 2021	23 November 2021	45 days
María Elisa Quinteros		Chile	Constitutional Convention	1 January 2022	4 July 2022	180 days
Shirley Rivera		Guatemala	Congress	14 January 2022	14 January 2024	2 years, 0 days
Tulia Ackson		Tanzania	National Assembly	1 February 2022	10 November 2025	3 years, 282 days
Anita Among		Uganda	Parliament	25 March 2022	11 May 2026	4 years, 47 days
Danijela Đurović		Montenegro	Parliament	28 April 2022	30 October 2023	1 year, 183 days
Lady Camones		Peru	Congress	26 July 2022	5 September 2022	41 days
Martha Moyano		Peru	Congress	5 September 2022	12 September 2022	7 days
Carolina Cerqueira		Angola	National Assembly	16 September 2022	Incumbent	4 years, 65 days
Brigitte Boccone-Pagès		Monaco	National Council	6 October 2022	3 April 2024	1 year, 180 days
Lanien Blanchette		Saint Kitts and Nevis	National Assembly	25 October 2022	Incumbent	4 years, 26 days
Celmira Sacramento		São Tomé and Príncipe	National Assembly	8 November 2022	Incumbent	4 years, 12 days
Dinorah Figuera (Note: President of the opposition-led IV National Assembly of Venezuela in exile. Disputed with Jorge Rodríguez.)		Venezuela	National Assembly	5 January 2023	Incumbent	3 years, 319 days
Adele Tonnini		San Marino	Grand and General Council	1 April 2023	1 October 2023	183 days
Dünýägözel Gulmanowa		Turkmenistan	Assembly	6 April 2023	Incumbent	3 years, 228 days
Maria Fernanda Lay		East Timor	National Parliament	22 June 2023	Incumbent	3 years, 151 days
Jessica Tan		Singapore	Parliament	17 July 2023	2 August 2023	16 days
Daiga Mieriņa		Latvia	Saeima	20 September 2023	3 November 2026	3 years, 44 days
Ana Brnabić		Serbia	National Assembly	20 March 2024	17 November 2026	2 years, 242 days
Milena Gasperoni		San Marino	Grand and General Council	1 April 2024	1 October 2024	183 days
Raya Nazaryan		Bulgaria	National Assembly	20 June 2024	10 November 2024	143 days
Raya Nazaryan		Bulgaria	National Assembly	29 October 2025	30 April 2026	183 days
Dana Castañeda		Panama	National Assembly	1 July 2024	1 July 2025	1 year, 0 days
Elisa Spiropali		Albania	Parliament	30 July 2024	12 September 2024	1 year, 44 days
Francesca Civerchia		San Marino	Grand and General Council	1 October 2024	1 April 2025	182 days
Viviana Veloz		Ecuador	National Assembly	2 October 2024	14 May 2025	224 days
Shirin Aumeeruddy-Cziffra		Mauritius	National Assembly	29 November 2024	Incumbent	1 year, 356 days
Ásthildur Lóa Þórsdóttir		Iceland	Althing	30 November 2024	4 February 2025	67 days
Nataliya Kiselova		Bulgaria	National Assembly	6 December 2024	29 October 2025	327 days
Margarida Talapa		Mozambique	Assembly of the Republic	13 January 2025	Incumbent	1 year, 311 days
Þórunn Sveinbjarnardóttir		Iceland	Althing	5 February 2025	Incumbent	1 year, 288 days
Raffaella Petrini		Vatican City	Pontifical Commission	1 March 2025	Incumbent	1 year, 264 days
Azarel Ernesta		Seychelles	National Assembly	28 October 2025	Incumbent	1 year, 23 days
Tatyana Zalevskaya		Transnistria	Supreme Council	4 December 2025	Incumbent	351 days
Ronnia Durham-Balcombe		Saint Vincent and the Grenadines	House of Assembly	23 December 2025	Incumbent	332 days
Albulena Haxhiu		Kosovo	Assembly of the Republic	11 February 2026	Incumbent	282 days
Alice Mina		San Marino	Grand and General Council	1 April 2026	1 October 2026	183 days
Mihaela Dotsova		Bulgaria	National Assembly	30 April 2026	Incumbent	204 days
Yara Jiménez Fallas		Costa Rica	Legislative Assembly	1 May 2026	Incumbent	203 days
Ágnes Forsthoffer		Hungary	National Assembly	9 May 2026	Incumbent	195 days
Janira Hopffer Almada		Cape Verde	National Assembly	9 May 2026	Incumbent	195 days

== Territorial ==
Denotes incumbent speaker of parliament

Italics denotes an acting speaker of parliament

Name	Image	Country	Legislative Body	Mandate start	Mandate end	Term length
Marguerite Story		Cook Islands	Parliament	1965	1979	14 years, 0 days
Ruby M. Rouss		United States Virgin Islands	Legislature	1981	1982	1 year, 0 days
Ruby M. Rouss		United States Virgin Islands	Legislature	January 1987	March 1987	59 days
Rosita Beatrice Missick-Butterfield		Turks and Caicos Islands	House of Assembly	1991	1993	2 years, 364 days
Sybil I. McLaughlin		Cayman Islands	Legislative Assembly	15 February 1991	November 1996	5 years, 260 days
Anabela Ritchie		Macau	Legislative Assembly	20 April 1992	20 December 1999	7 years, 244 days
Lillian Oh		Christmas Island	Shire Council	1 July 1992	1995	2 years, 184 days
Margie Sudre		Réunion	Regional Council	25 June 1993	23 March 1998	4 years, 271 days
Marita Petersen		Faroe Islands	Løgting	1994	1995	1 year, 0 days
Lorraine L. Berry		United States Virgin Islands	Legislature	1997	1998	1 year, 0 days
Lorraine L. Berry		United States Virgin Islands	Legislature	2005	2007	2 years, 0 days
Emily Augusta Saunders		Turks and Caicos Islands	House of Assembly	1998	1999	1 year, 364 days
Rita Fan		Hong Kong	Legislative Council	2 July 1998	30 September 2008	10 years, 90 days
Susana Chou		Macau	Legislative Assembly	20 December 1999	15 October 2009	9 years, 299 days
Lucette Taero		French Polynesia	Assembly	17 May 2001	3 June 2004	3 years, 17 days
Viveka Eriksson		Åland	Lagtinget	2001	2005	4 years, 0 days
Anne Mitchell-Gift		Tobago	House of Assembly	2001	24 January 2013	12 years, 23 days
Julianna O'Connor-Connolly		Cayman Islands	Legislative Assembly	November 2001	October 2003	1 year, 334 days
Julianna O'Connor-Connolly		Cayman Islands	Legislative Assembly	29 May 2013	24 May 2017	3 years, 360 days
V. Inez Archibald		British Virgin Islands	House of Assembly	2003	2007	4 years, 0 days
Nassimah Dindar		Réunion	Departamental Council	1 April 2004	2 April 2015	11 years, 1 day
Nassimah Dindar		Réunion	Departamental Council	2 April 2015	2 October 2017	2 years, 183 days
Brenda Christian		Pitcairn Islands	Island Council	8 November 2004	15 December 2004	37 days
Barbro Sundback		Åland	Landtag	2005	2007	2 years, 0 days
Edna Moyle		Cayman Islands	Legislative Assembly	18 May 2005	27 May 2009	4 years, 9 days
Eileen Bell		Northern Ireland	Assembly	8 May 2007	8 May 2007	0 days
Margaret Anne Catherine Hopkins		Saint Helena	Legislative Council	2008	13 April 2017	9 years, 102 days
Ruth Heilmann		Greenland	Inatsisartut	2008	2009	1 year, 0 days
Judith Won Pat		Guam	Legislature	7 March 2008	2 January 2017	8 years, 301 days
Marthe Ogoundélé-Tessi		Saint Martin	Territorial Council	25 July 2008	8 August 2008	14 days
Mary J. Lawrence		Cayman Islands	Legislative Assembly	27 May 2009	29 May 2013	4 years, 2 days
Barbara Webster-Bourne		Anguilla	House of Assembly	27 February 2010	11 May 2015	5 years, 73 days
Barbara Webster-Bourne		Anguilla	House of Assembly	17 July 2020	29 January 2025	4 years, 196 days
Robin Adams		Norfolk Island	Legislative Assembly	24 March 2010	20 March 2013	2 years, 361 days
Teresina Bodkin		Montserrat	Legislative Council	16 April 2010	2014	3 years, 260 days
Teresina Bodkin		Montserrat	Legislative Council	17 December 2019	20 December 2020	1 year, 3 days
Josette Manin		Martinique	General Council	31 March 2011	18 December 2015	4 years, 262 days
Rosemary Butler		Wales	National Assembly	11 May 2011	11 May 2016	5 years, 0 days
Tricia Marwick		Scotland	Parliament	11 May 2011	12 May 2016	5 years, 1 day
Britt Lundberg		Åland	Lagtinget	28 November 2011	28 November 2015	4 years, 0 days
Ingrid Moses-Scatliffe		British Virgin Islands	House of Assembly	8 December 2011	12 March 2019	7 years, 94 days
Niki Rattle		Cook Islands	Parliament	22 May 2012	15 February 2021	8 years, 269 days
Nivaleta Iloai		Wallis and Futuna	Territorial Assembly	1 April 2013	11 December 2013	254 days
Nivaleta Iloai		Wallis and Futuna	Territorial Assembly	26 November 2020	25 March 2022	1 year, 119 days
Aline Hanson		Saint Martin	Territorial Council	17 April 2013	2 April 2017	3 years, 350 days
Sarah Wescot-Williams		Sint Maarten	Staten	10 October 2014	13 November 2014	34 days
Sarah Wescot-Williams		Sint Maarten	Staten	12 October 2015	31 October 2016	1 year, 19 days
Sarah Wescot-Williams		Sint Maarten	Staten	24 November 2016	22 September 2019	2 years, 302 days
Sarah Wescot-Williams		Sint Maarten	Staten	10 February 2024	Incumbent	2 years, 283 days
Shirley Osborne		Montserrat	Legislative Council	23 January 2015	17 December 2019	4 years, 328 days
Josette Borel-Lincertin		Guadeloupe	Departmental Council	2 April 2015	1 July 2021	6 years, 90 days
Elin Jones		Wales	National Assembly	11 May 2016	12 May 2026	10 years, 1 day
Vanessa Cutting-Thomas		Tobago	House of Assembly	28 April 2016	26 January 2017	273 days
Vanessa Cutting-Thomas		Tobago	House of Assembly	19 December 2019	25 September 2020	281 days
Giselle McWilliams		Curaçao	Staten	16 January 2017	17 February 2017	32 days
Denise Tsoiafatt Angus		Tobago	House of Assembly	26 January 2017	21 November 2019	2 years, 299 days
Seri Wati Iku		Cocos (Keeling) Islands	Shire Council	25 October 2017	23 October 2019	1 year, 363 days
Therese M. Terlaje		Guam	Legislature	28 August 2018	7 January 2019	132 days
Therese M. Terlaje		Guam	Legislature	4 January 2021	6 January 2025	4 years, 2 days
Vivian Motzfeldt		Greenland	Inatsisartut	3 October 2018	16 April 2021	2 years, 195 days
Tina Rose Muña Barnes		Guam	Legislature	7 January 2019	4 January 2021	1 year, 363 days
Ana-Maria Pauletta		Curaçao	Staten	3 June 2020	11 May 2021	342 days
Charliena White		Montserrat	Legislative	20 December 2020	8 November 2024	3 years, 324 days
Donna Frett-Gregory		U.S. Virgin Islands	Legislature	11 January 2021	9 January 2023	1 year, 363 days
Charetti America-Francisca		Curaçao	Staten	11 May 2021	7 April 2025	3 years, 331 days
Alison Johnstone		Scotland	Parliament	13 May 2021	14 May 2026	5 years, 1 day
Marie-Antoinette Maupertuis		Corsica	Assembly	7 February 2021	Incumbent	5 years, 142 days
Huguette Bello		Reunion	Regional Council	7 February 2021	Incumbent	5 years, 141 days
Abby Taylor		Tobago	House of Assembly	9 December 2021	Incumbent	4 years, 346 days
Bjørt Samuelsen		Faroe Islands	Løgting	22 December 2022	13 April 2026	3 years, 112 days
Corine George-Massicote		British Virgin Islands	House of Assembly	26 May 2022	Incumbent	4 years, 178 days
Katherine Ebanks-Wilks		Cayman Islands	Parliament	25 November 2022	15 November 2023	355 days
Mimi Karlsen		Greenland	Inatsisartut	22 September 2023	7 April 2025	1 year, 197 days
Ingrid Zetterman		Åland	Lagtinget	3 November 2023	Incumbent	3 years, 17 days
Karen Ramagge Prescott		Gibraltar	Parliament	10 November 2023	Incumbent	3 years, 10 days
Veylma Falaeo		New Caledonia	Congress	29 August 2024	10 July 2026	1 year, 315 days
Marjorie Smith		Montserrat	Legislative Assembly	8 November 2024	Incumbent	2 years, 12 days
Tara Carter		Anguilla	House of Assembly	11 March 2025	Incumbent	1 year, 254 days
Maureen Thompson		Saint Helena	Legislative Council	11 September 2025	Incumbent	1 year, 70 days
Starry Lee		Hong Kong	Legislative Council	8 January 2026	Incumbent	316 days
Virginie Ruffenach		New Caledonia	Congress	10 July 2026	Incumbent	133 days

== See also ==
- List of female speakers of national and territorial lower houses
- List of female speakers of national and territorial upper houses
- List of current presidents of legislatures
- Parliament
- Speaker (politics)
- Unicameralism
