= Thamaga-Kumakwane =

Parliamentary constituency in Botswana

- Single-member constituency for the National Assembly
- District: Kweneng
- Population: 38,498
- Electorate: 19,275
- Major settlements: Thamaga; Kumakwane
- Area: 776 km^{2}

Current constituency
- Created: 1965
- Party: BDP
- MP: Palelo Motaosane
- Margin of victory: 2,191 (14.1 pp)

Thamaga-Kumakwane is a constituency in the Kweneng District represented by Palelo Motaosane, a BDP MP in the National Assembly of Botswana since 2019.

== Constituency profile ==
Thamaga-Kumakwane has existed since the inaugural 1965 general election, when it was contested as Kweneng South. The constituency has also been known as Thamaga, before being renamed Thamaga-Kumakwane from the 2014 general election onwards.

The constituency lies west of Gaborone and is anchored by the villages of Thamaga and Kumakwane. It occupies part of Botswana's south-eastern hardveld and forms part of the peri-urban and rural belt between the capital region and the wider Kweneng area. Its settlements include both commuter villages within Greater Gaborone and more rural communities.

The constituency is one of the BDP's last surviving strongholds. Like neighbouring Moshupa-Manyana, it has never returned a Member of Parliament from any party other than the BDP. This makes it one of the few existing constituencies in Botswana where the BDP has retained uninterrupted parliamentary representation since the first general election. In the 2024 general election, when the BDP suffered its first national defeat and won only four elected constituencies, Thamaga-Kumakwane was one of two constituencies where the party won with an outright majority of the vote.

The constituency has the following localities:

1. Thamaga
2. Kumakwane
3. Ramaphatle
4. Gakgatla
5. Kubung

== Members of Parliament ==
Key: BDP

Election	Winner
1965 election	Johnson Nkoane
1969 election	Johnson Nkoane
1974 election	Peter Mmusi
1979 election	Englishman Kgabo
1984 election	Englishman Kgabo
1989 election	Peter Mmusi
1994 election	Gladys Kokorwe
1999 election	Gladys Kokorwe
2004 election	Gladys Kokorwe
2009 election	John Seakgosing
2014 election	Tshenolo Mabeo
2019 election	Palelo Motaosane
2024 election	Palelo Motaosane

== Election results ==
=== 2024 election ===
General election 2024: Thamaga-Kumakwane
Party	Candidate	Votes	%	±%
BDP	Palelo Motaosane	8,310	53.29	−24.15
UDC	Kopano Rannatshe	6,119	39.24	+19.96
BCP	Seatla Mookodi	1,166	7.48	N/A
Margin of victory		2,191	14.05	−44.11
Total valid votes		15,595	98.66	−0.61
Rejected ballots		212	1.34	+0.61
Turnout		15,807	82.01	−4.91
Registered electors		19,275		
BDP hold		Swing	−22.05	

=== 2019 election ===
General election 2019: Thamaga-Kumakwane
Party	Candidate	Votes	%	±%
BDP	Palelo Motaosane	13,461	77.43	+28.51
UDC	Ofentse Khumomotse	3,351	19.28	−24.29
AP	Marie Sola	347	2.00	N/A
Independent	Kopano Rannatshe	180	1.04	N/A
Independent	Guy Mollentze	45	0.26	N/A
Margin of victory		10,110	58.16	+52.81
Total valid votes		17,384	99.27	+0.64
Rejected ballots		128	0.73	−0.64
Turnout		17,512	86.92	+0.41
Registered electors		20,147		
BDP hold		Swing	+26.40	

=== 2014 election ===
General election 2014: Thamaga-Kumakwane
Party	Candidate	Votes	%	±%
BDP	Tshenolo Mabeo	7,053	48.92	−8.63
UDC	Kopano Rannatshe	6,281	43.57	+1.12
BCP	Duke Molelekedi	874	6.06	N/A
Independent	Thomas Motlogelwa	105	0.73	N/A
Independent	Marie Sola	104	0.72	N/A
Margin of victory		772	5.35	−9.75
Total valid votes		14,417	98.63	+1.01
Rejected ballots		200	1.37	−1.01
Turnout		14,617	86.51	+6.77
Registered electors		16,896		
BDP hold		Swing	−4.87	

=== 2009 election ===
General election 2009: Kweneng South
Party	Candidate	Votes	%	±%
BDP	John Seakgosing	7,683	57.55	+8.32
BNF	Kopano Rannatshe	5,667	42.45	+4.92
Margin of victory		2,016	15.10	+3.40
Total valid votes		13,350	97.62	−0.17
Rejected ballots		325	2.38	+0.17
Turnout		13,675	79.74	+2.01
Registered electors		17,150		
BDP hold		Swing	+1.70	

=== 2004 election ===
General election 2004: Kweneng South
Party	Candidate	Votes	%	±%
BDP	Gladys Kokorwe	4,658	49.23	−18.17
BNF	Kopano Rannatshe	3,551	37.53	+8.48
BCP	Duke Molelekedi	1,253	13.24	+9.69
Margin of victory		1,107	11.70	−26.65
Total valid votes		9,462	97.79	+0.86
Rejected ballots		214	2.21	−0.86
Turnout		9,676	77.73	−2.62
Registered electors		12,449		
BDP hold		Swing	−13.32	

=== 1999 election ===
General election 1999: Thamaga
Party	Candidate	Votes	%	±%
BDP	Gladys Kokorwe	5,793	67.40	+5.40
BNF	E. Monare	2,497	29.05	−8.95
BCP	G. Ntsatsi	305	3.55	N/A
Margin of victory		3,296	38.35	+14.35
Total valid votes		8,595	96.93	N/A
Rejected ballots		272	3.07	N/A
Turnout		8,867	80.35	N/A
Registered electors		11,035		
BDP hold		Swing	+7.17	

=== 1994 election ===
General election 1994: Thamaga
Party	Candidate	Votes	%	±%
BDP	Gladys Kokorwe	N/A	62.00	−13.48
BNF	E. Monare	N/A	38.00	+13.48
Margin of victory		N/A	24.00	−26.95
BDP hold		Swing	−13.48	

=== 1989 election ===
General election 1989: Kweneng South
Party	Candidate	Votes	%	±%
BDP	Peter Mmusi	5,946	75.48	+1.76
BNF	Murray Dipate	1,932	24.52	−1.76
Margin of victory		4,014	50.95	+3.52
Turnout		7,878	72.35	−10.69
Registered electors		10,888		
BDP hold		Swing	+1.76	

=== 1984 election ===
General election 1984: Kweneng South
Party	Candidate	Votes	%	±%
BDP	Englishman Kgabo	5,890	73.72	−6.41
BNF	Diratsame Mosielele	2,100	26.28	+6.41
Margin of victory		3,790	47.43	−12.82
Turnout		7,990	83.04	+22.02
Registered electors		9,621		
BDP hold		Swing	−6.41	

=== 1979 election ===
General election 1979: Kweneng South
Party	Candidate	Votes	%	±%
BDP	Englishman Kgabo	3,653	80.13	−3.52
BNF	B. Mosielele	906	19.87	+3.52
Margin of victory		2,747	60.25	−7.05
Turnout		4,559	61.03	+34.21
Registered electors		7,470		
BDP hold		Swing	−3.52	

=== 1974 election ===
General election 1974: Kweneng South
Party	Candidate	Votes	%	±%
BDP	Peter Mmusi	1,499	83.65	−1.44
BNF	B. Mosielele	293	16.35	+8.16
Margin of victory		1,206	67.30	−9.60
Turnout		1,792	26.82	−24.79
Registered electors		6,683		
BDP hold		Swing	−4.80	

=== 1969 election ===
General election 1969: Kweneng South
Party	Candidate	Votes	%	±%
BDP	Johnson Nkoane	2,203	85.09	−5.90
BNF	L. Sekgwa	212	8.19	N/A
BPP	G. Sejabodile	174	6.72	−2.29
Margin of victory		1,991	76.90	−5.08
Turnout		2,589	51.61	−27.49
Registered electors		5,016		
BDP hold		Swing	N/A	

=== 1965 election ===
General election 1965: Kweneng South
Party	Candidate	Votes	%
BDP	Johnson Nkoane	5,321	90.99
BPP	B. Segokotlo	527	9.01
Margin of victory		4,794	81.98
Turnout		5,848	79.10
Registered electors		N/A	
BDP win (new seat)			
