= List of political parties in Botswana =

Botswana was a dominant-party state with the Botswana Democratic Party in power for most of its history. Opposition parties were widely considered to have little chance of gaining a parliamentary majority until the 2024 Botswana general election which saw the Umbrella for Democratic Change win a parliamentary majority.

== Current parties ==
=== Parties represented in the National Assembly ===
Alliance	Abbr.	Party	Abbr.	Ideology	Seats
Umbrella for Democratic; Change	UDC	Alliance for Progressives	AP	Social liberalism; Civic nationalism	36 / 69
Umbrella for Democratic; Change	UDC	Botswana People's Party	BPP	Democratic socialism; Pan-Africanism	36 / 69
Umbrella for Democratic; Change	UDC	Botswana National Front	BNF	Social democracy Christian left	36 / 69
		Botswana Congress Party	BCP	Social democracy; Third Way	15 / 69
		Botswana Patriotic Front	BPF	Populism	5 / 69
		Botswana Democratic Party	BDP	Paternalistic conservatism	4 / 69

=== Minor parties ===
Party	Abbr.	Leader	Ideology
Botswana Labour Party	BLP	Moiseraele Dibeela	Socialism; Co-operative economics; Economic nationalism
Botswana Movement for Democracy	BMD	Julius Baitumetse	Right-wing populism
Botswana Republican Party	BRP	Biggie Butale	Christian democracy; Social conservatism
Real Alternative Party	RAP	Gaontebale Mokgosi	Socialism; Revolutionary socialism

== Historical ==
Alliance name	Abbr.	Ideology	Existence
Botswana Alliance Movement	BAM	Progressivism	1999-2010
Botswana Freedom Party	BFP		?-1994
Botswana Independence Party	BIP		1962-1994
Botswana Liberal Party	BLP	Liberalism	1983-?
Botswana Progressive Union	BPU		1984-1991
Botswana Workers Front	BWF	Nationalism; Christian democracy	1993-?
Independence Freedom Party	IFP		1994
MELS Movement of Botswana	MELS	Marxism–Leninism; Anti-revisionism; Pan-Africanism	1984-2013
New Democratic Front	NDF	Progressivism	2003-2004
Social Democratic Party	SDP	Social democracy	1999
United Action Party	UAP	Familialism; Youth rights; Feminism	1999-?
United Socialist Party	USP; PUSO	Left-wing politics	1994-1999

=== Political alliances ===
Alliance name	Abbr.	Ideology	Existence
United Democratic Front	UDF	Nationalism; Christian democracy	1999-2010

== See also ==
- Politics of Botswana
- Lists of political parties
- Elections in Botswana
- National Assembly (Botswana)
