= Gaborone Central =

Parliamentary constituency in Gaborone

- Single-member constituency for the National Assembly
- District: Gaborone
- Population: 47,291
- Major settlements: Gaborone
- Area: 23 km^{2}

Current constituency
- Created: 1994
- Party: UDC
- Created from: Gaborone South; Gaborone North
- MP: Phenyo Butale
- Margin of victory: 2,381 (20.5 pp)

Gaborone Central is a constituency in Gaborone represented in the National Assembly of Botswana by the Minister of International Affairs, Phenyo Butale of the Umbrella for Democratic Change since the 2024 general election.

== Constituency profile ==
The constituency was created in 1994 as part of an expansion that increased the number of Gaborone constituencies from two to four. It is the swingiest seat in the country, having only re-elected an incumbent once. The constituency is not necessarily marginal i.e., it usually is won with large majorities. Despite electing MPs with large majorities, these majorities are frequently easily overturned from one election to the next. The constituency serves as a bellwether of national electoral trends, with the notable exceptions of 2004 and 2009, when Dumelang Saleshando, the future leader of the Botswana Congress Party (BCP), ran a well-organized and "high-profile" campaign in 2004 and became the party’s sole MP in the 9th Parliament. He was re-elected in 2009 with the largest majority ever recorded in the constituency—35 percentage points.

However, at the 2014 general election, Saleshando's large majority was overturned as he lost the seat to Phenyo Butale of the UDC who benefitted from a combination of sympathy votes following the death of the initial UDC candidate, the Botswana Movement for Democracy leader, Gomolemo Motswaledi in July, as well as voter dissatisfaction with Saleshando and the BCP for not joining the UDC to form a united opposition against the BDP.

Since its creation, the BDP has won the constituency only twice (1999 and 2019), both times with less than 50% of the vote. The constituency is entirely urban and contains a diverse mix of communities. It is home to both the nation's wealthiest suburbs and the city's most impoverished neighbourhoods, as well as the University of Botswana and a Botswana Defence Force encampment. The kaleidoscopic nature of the constituency means it's home to many swing voters and explains its political volatility.

It encompasses the following locations:

1. Station Mall
2. Main Mall
3. Botswelelo
4. Phologolo
5. Madibeng
6. Partial
7. Tshimotharo
8. Ginger
9. Maruapula
10. Broadhurst
11. Extension 39
12. Village
13. Badiri
14. Government Enclave

== Members of Parliament ==
Key: BNF BDP BCP UDC UDC

Election	Winner
1994 election	Michael Dingake
1999 election	Margaret Nasha
2004 election	Dumelang Saleshando
2009 election	Dumelang Saleshando
2014 election	Phenyo Butale
2019 election	Tumisang Healy
2024 election	Phenyo Butale

== Election results ==
=== 2024 election ===
General election 2024: Gaborone Central
Party	Candidate	Votes	%	±%
UDC	Phenyo Butale	5,493	47.30	+16.89
BCP	Mpho Pheko	3,112	26.80	N/A
BDP	Bontsi Monare	2,826	24.34	−23.82
BPF	Kemmonye Sekati	122	1.05	N/A
BMD	Magdeline Nkumba	35	0.30	N/A
Independent	Jafta Radibe	24	0.21	+0.05
Margin of victory		2,381	20.50	N/A
Total valid votes		11,612	98.80	−0.76
Rejected ballots		141	1.20	+0.76
Turnout		11,753	76.41	−2.88
Registered electors		15,381		
UDC gain from BDP		Swing	+21.85	

=== 2019 election ===
General election 2019: Gaborone Central
Party	Candidate	Votes	%	±%
BDP	Tumisang Healy	4,886	48.16	+20.54
UDC	Mpho Pheko	3,085	30.41	−9.41
AP	Phenyo Butale	2,106	20.76	N/A
Independent	Letsweletse Moses	53	0.52	N/A
Independent	Jafta Radibe	16	0.16	N/A
Margin of victory		1,801	17.75	N/A
Total valid votes		10,146	99.56	−0.03
Rejected ballots		45	0.44	+0.03
Turnout		10,191	79.29	−3.31
Registered electors		12,853		
BDP gain from UDC		Swing	+14.98	

=== 2014 election ===
General election 2014: Gaborone Central
Party	Candidate	Votes	%	±%
UDC	Phenyo Butale	4,601	39.82	N/A
BCP	Dumelang Saleshando	3,727	32.26	−29.49
BDP	Rupert Hambira	3,191	27.62	+0.68
Independent	Sidney Baitsile	35	0.30	N/A
Margin of victory		874	7.56	N/A
Total valid votes		11,554	99.53	+1.52
Rejected ballots		55	0.47	−1.52
Turnout		11,609	82.60	+6.34
Registered electors		14,054		
UDC gain from BCP		Swing	+34.66	

=== 2009 election ===
General election 2009: Gaborone Central
Party	Candidate	Votes	%	±%
BCP	Dumelang Saleshando	6,102	61.75	+23.87
BDP	Kgomotso Mogami	2,662	26.94	−9.79
BNF	Calvin Thutlwe	1,118	11.31	−12.96
Margin of victory		3,440	34.81	+33.66
Total valid votes		9,882	98.01	−1.65
Rejected ballots		201	1.99	+1.65
Turnout		10,083	76.26	+0.05
Registered electors		13,222		
BCP hold		Swing	+16.83	

=== 2004 election ===
General election 2004: Gaborone Central
Party	Candidate	Votes	%	±%
BCP	Dumelang Saleshando	2,992	37.88	+21.58
BDP	Margaret Nasha	2,901	36.73	−10.82
BNF	Kathleen Letshabo	1,917	24.27	−6.80
NDF	Violet Mphuting	89	1.13	N/A
Margin of victory		91	1.15	N/A
Total valid votes		7,899	99.66	+0.47
Rejected ballots		34	0.34	−0.47
Turnout		7,926	76.21	+1.80
Registered electors		10,400		
BCP gain from BDP		Swing	+16.20	

=== 1999 election ===
General election 1999: Gaborone Central
Party	Candidate	Votes	%	±%
BDP	Margaret Nasha	2,868	47.55	+9.07
BNF	Mareledi Giddie	1,874	31.07	−29.37
BCP	Michael Dingake	983	16.30	N/A
BAM	Ephraim Setshwaelo	293	4.86	N/A
MELS	Themba Joina	13	0.22	N/A
Margin of victory		994	16.48	N/A
Total valid votes		6,031	99.19	N/A
Rejected ballots		49	0.81	N/A
Turnout		6,080	74.41	−3.60
Registered electors		8,171		
BDP gain from BNF		Swing	+19.22	

=== 1994 election ===
General election 1994: Gaborone Central
Party	Candidate	Votes	%
BNF	Michael Dingake	3,490	60.44
BDP	G.U.S. Matlhabaphiri	2,222	38.48
UDF	Mareledi Giddie	62	1.07
Margin of victory		1,268	21.96
Turnout		5,774	78.01%
Registered electors		7,402	
BNF win (new seat)			
