= Mantshwabisi =

- Village
- Location in Botswana
- Coordinates: 24°10′53″S 25°16′28″E
- Country: Botswana
- District: Kweneng District

Population (2001)
  - Total: 464

Mantshwabisi is a village in Kweneng District of Botswana. It is located 45 km north-west of Molepolole, along the Molepolole–Letlhakeng road. The population of Mantshwabisi was 464 in 2001 census.
