= Mabry S. Kirkconnell =

Caymanian politician and parliamentary speaker

The Honourable Captain Mabry S. Kirkconnell OBE, JP

Speaker of the Legislative Assembly of the Cayman Islands
- In office 27 November 1996 – 14 November 2001
- Preceded by: Sybil I. McLaughlin
- Succeeded by: Julianna O'Connor-Connolly

Member of the Legislative Assembly of the Cayman Islands
- In office 1992–1996
- Constituency: Cayman Brac and Little Cayman

Mabry S. Kirkconnell was a Caymanian politician served as Speaker of the Legislative Assembly of the Cayman Islands from 1996 to 2001.

Before becoming Speaker, Kirkconnell represented Cayman Brac and Little Cayman in the Legislative Assembly of the Cayman Islands during the 1992–1996 parliamentary term.

== Political career ==
Kirkconnell was elected for Cayman Brac and Little Cayman in the 1992–1996 term of the Legislative Assembly. At the swearing-in ceremony held on 27 November 1996, he was nominated for Speaker by Julianna O'Connor-Connolly and seconded by Truman Bodden, and was then elected to preside over the legislature.

Kirkconnell took retirement on 14 November 2001. At the same sitting, Julianna O'Connor-Connolly was elected as the new Speaker.
