= Moggie Mbaakanyi =

Politician from Botswana

Hon. Moggie Mbaakanyi

President of the Botswana Caucus for Women in Politics
- Incumbent
- Assumed office 2010
- Preceded by: Margaret Nasha

Member of the National Assembly of Botswana
- In office 2004–2009
- President: Festus Mogae
- Constituency: Specially Elected Member

Personal details
- Born: Kalakamati, Botswana
- Occupation: Politician
- Known for: Women's political empowerment

Moggie Mbaakanyi is a politician from Botswana with the Botswana Democratic Party. Mbaakanyi served in the 9th Parliament of Botswana. Mbaakanyi serves as the president of the Botswana Caucus for Women in Politics.
