= MELS =

MELS can mean:

- Marx Engels Lenin Stalin
- Ministry of Education and Higher Education (Quebec)
- MELS Movement of Botswana
