= Speaker of the Parliament of the Cayman Islands =

- Coat of arms of the Cayman Islands
- Incumbent; Ezzard Miller since 6 May 2025
- Style: Mister Speaker (within Parliament); The Honourable (formal)
- Appointer: Parliament of the Cayman Islands
- Term length: four years

The Speaker of the Parliament of the Cayman Islands is the presiding officer of the Parliament of the Cayman Islands, the legislature of the British Overseas Territory of the Cayman Islands. The current Speaker is Ezzard Miller was elected in May 2025.

== List of Speakers ==
Name (Birth–Death)	Tenure		Party
Name (Birth–Death)	Took office	Left office	Party
Speakers of the Legislative Assembly of the Cayman Islands
Sybil I. McLaughlin (1928 – 2022)	15 February 1991	30 September 1996	
Mabry S. Kirkconnell (1931–2002)	27 November 1996	14 November 2001	
Julianna O'Connor-Connolly (1961–)	14 November 2001	10 October 2003	United Democratic Party
Linford A. Pierson (1941–)	10 October 2003	15 March 2005	United Democratic Party
Edna Moyle (1942–2013)	18 May 2005	24 March 2009	People's Progressive Movement
Mary J. Lawrence (1961–)	27 May 2009	26 March 2013	
Julianna O'Connor-Connolly (1961–)	29 May 2013	28 March 2017	People's Progressive Movement
McKeeva Bush (1955–)	31 May 2017	2 December 2020	Cayman Democratic Party
Speakers of the Parliament of the Cayman Islands
McKeeva Bush (1955–)	3 December 2020	14 February 2021	Cayman Democratic Party
McKeeva Bush (1955–)	21 April 2021	12 October 2022	
Katherine Ebanks-Wilks (?–)	25 November 2022	15 November 2023	
Alden McLaughlin (1961–)	23 November 2023	1 March 2025	People's Progressive Movement
Ezzard Miller (?–)	6 May 2025	Incumbent	
