= Gladys Kokorwe =

Botswanan politician (1947–2026)

Gladys Kokorwe PH

Speaker of the National Assembly of Botswana
- In office 12 November 2014 – 5 November 2019
- Preceded by: Margaret Nasha
- Succeeded by: Phandu Skelemani

Personal details
- Born: 28 November 1947 Cape Town, Cape Province, Union of South Africa
- Died: 11 March 2026 (aged 78) Gaborone, Botswana
- Party: Botswana Democratic Party

Gladys Keitumetse Theresa Kokorwe (20 November 1947 – 11 March 2026) was a Motswana politician who was the Speaker of the National Assembly from 2014 to 2019. She was a member of the Botswana Democratic Party (BDP).

Prior to entering politics, Kokorwe was a senior civil servant. She was elected to the National Assembly at the 1994 general election, and served as an assistant minister in the government of Festus Mogae from 1999 to 2004. She was deputy speaker from 2004 to 2008, and then a minister in Ian Khama's government from 2008 to 2009, when she left parliament. Kokorwe served as Botswana's ambassador to Zimbabwe from 2009 to 2014, and then re-entered politics after the 2014 election, when she was the successful BDP candidate for speaker.

== Early life ==
Kokorwe was born in Cape Town, Union of South Africa, where her father (originally from Botswana) was working. She was sent back to Botswana at the age of 10, and went to primary school in Thamaga, Kweneng District. Her secondary schooling was completed at Moeng College, a boarding school in the Tswapong Hills. After leaving school, Kokorwe joined the public service, where she initially worked as a typist and minor clerical worker. She eventually came to hold various high-level administrative positions in local government, serving for periods as the commercial officer for Lobatse, the town clerk of Sowa and Gaborone, and assistant council secretary for the Kgatleng District. After a term as the chief training officer for local government officials, she returned to the Kgatleng District as its chief executive officer (CEO).

== Politics ==
=== 1994–2008 ===
In the 1994 general election, Kokorwe was elected to the National Assembly for the Botswana Democratic Party (BDP), representing the Thamaga constituency previously held by Peter Mmusi (a former vice-president who died just before the election). She switched to the new Kweneng South constituency at the 1999 election, and was subsequently appointed Assistant Minister of Local Government (under senior minister Margaret Nasha) by President Festus Mogae. Kokorwe was left out of the ministry after the 2004 election, but was instead elected deputy speaker, becoming the first woman to hold the position. In March 2004, she had reportedly been censured by BDP officials for publicly suggesting that Louis Nchindo (the managing director of the Debswana Diamond Company) should enter politics. This was perceived as a threat to the party's existing leadership.

=== 2008–2026 ===
In April 2008, Kokorwe was appointed Minister of Youth, Sport and Culture in the new cabinet formed by Ian Khama, who had succeeded Festus Mogae as president. She served as a minister until the 2009 general election, at which she retired from parliament. In August 2008, Kokorwe had become the first parliamentarian in Botswana's history to have a private member's bill become law. Her bill, which she had tabled before being appointed to cabinet, aimed to better protect victims of domestic violence, and was passed into law in September 2008 as the Domestic Violence Act. A few months after leaving parliament, in December 2009, Ian Khama appointed Kokorwe as Botswana's ambassador to Zimbabwe. She was based in Harare, but also had non-resident accreditation to Malawi, Mozambique, and Mauritius.

In November 2014, after the 2014 general election, Kokorwe returned to politics as the BDP nominee for the speakership of the National Assembly. She defeated the previous speaker, Margaret Nasha, in a 41–21 vote along party lines, Nasha having been re-nominated by the opposition parties. Nasha was also a BDP member, but had fallen out with President Khama. Before the question of the speakership was put before parliament, there had been a controversy over whether the vote should be undertaken by voice or by secret ballot. The government claimed that a secret ballot would be unconstitutional, but a court ruling found that it was not.

== Death ==
Kokorwe died in Gaborone on 11 March 2026, at the age of 78.

== Honours ==
- Presidential Order of Honour (PH)

== See also ==
- List of female speakers of national and territorial unicameral parliaments
