= Howard Fergus =

Montserratian academic (1937–2023)

The Honourable Sir Howard Fergus KBE
- Born: Howard Archibald Fergus; 22 July 1937; Long Ground, Montserrat
- Died: 23 March 2023 (aged 85)
- Education: University of the West Indies; University of Bristol; University of Manchester
- Occupations: Writer, historian, academic and teacher

Sir Howard Archibald Fergus KBE (22 July 1937 – 23 March 2023) was a Montserratian author and historian. He was born at Long Ground in Montserrat. He attended Bethel Primary School, Montserrat Secondary School, Erdiston Teachers College in Barbados, the University College of the West Indies (London), the Universities of Bristol and Manchester, and finally the University of the West Indies (UWI), earning a PhD in 1978. He retired from the university in 2004 as professor of Eastern Caribbean studies.

Fergus wrote and edited more than 14 books, including several works on Montserratian history and society. His scholarly works were published in a number of international journals and he was also an established poet.

Fergus was the winner of The Caribbean Writer Poetry Prize in 1992, and of the David Hough Literary Prize for an author residing in the Caribbean in 2002.

== Life and career ==
Fergus served as the Speaker of the Legislative Council of Montserrat from 1975 to 2001, one of the longest terms for a presiding officer in the Commonwealth of Nations. He subsequently returned to the post as acting speaker on several occasions, as well as periodically serving as deputy Governor of Montserrat and acting governor when the role was vacant. He also served on several committees related to constitutional and electoral matters.

Fergus's most important work was the book Montserrat: History of a Caribbean Colony published in 1994 by The Macmillan Press, London, ISBN 978-0-333-61217-0. This historical account was supported by copious references to primary sources, and contains chapters on settlement, sugar, slavery, emancipation, cotton, limes and The Montserrat Company, politics, education, and arts and culture.

Teresina Bodkin was identified as a prospective speaker in 2009. She was supported in getting ready for this role by six months of training by Fergus. During that time Fergus returned to his former role replacing the previous speaker, Joseph Meade. On 6 April 2010, Bodkin was selected as the first female Speaker of the island's Legislative Council. Bodkin served until September 2014.

Fergus wrote the words for the national song of Montserrat, "Motherland", with the music composed and arranged by George Irish.

Fergus died on 23 March 2023, at the age of 85.

== Honours ==
Fergus was made an Officer of the Order of the British Empire (OBE) in the 1979 Birthday Honours "for services to education and the community in Montserrat", and was upgraded to Commander of the same Order (CBE) in the 1995 New Year Honours. In the 2001 Birthday Honours, he was knighted as a Knight Commander of the Order of the British Empire (KBE). Fergus received the Order of Excellence from the Government of Montserrat in 2014.

== Published books ==
Fergus was an historian of Montserrat and wrote extensively about the island. His published works included History Of Alliougana: A Short History of Montserrat (1975), Montserrat the Last English Colony? Prospects for Independence (1978); William H. Bramble: His Life and Times (1983); Hugo Versus Montserrat (with E.A. Markham (1989)) and Montserrat: History of a Caribbean Colony (1994).

His poetry began appearing from 1976, with "Cotton Rhymes; Green Innocence" (1978) and "Stop the Carnival" (1980), and his poems were anthologised in the Penguin Book of Caribbean Verse and appeared in Artrage, Writing Ulster, Bim, The New Voices, Caribbean Quarterly, Ambit, Caribanthology and others. In 1998, Peepal Tree published "Lara Rains & Colonial Rights".

1996 – Eruption. Montserrat versus Volcano edited by Howard Fergus, was produced in response to the Soufriere Hills volcanic eruption, containing a number of essays on the volcano; and poems and stories written by Montserratians of all ages. This was published by the University of West Indies, School of Continuing Studies, Montserrat. ISBN 976-8018-06-2.

2003 – Volcano Verses is a collection of poems in three sections: 'volcano verses', 'people' and 'occasional poems'. Published by Peepal Tree Press. ISBN 978-1900-715799.

2004 – Beneath The Bananas: Poems of Montserrat Celebrating the Centenary of The Birth of R.W. Griffith 1904 – 2004. The book includes poems in the names of individual authors; reveals "a new level of maturity and creative skill; and the book benefits greatly from the presence of Archie Markham, Fellow of the Royal Society of Literature and Professor of Creative Writing at Sheffield Hallam University". The book was published with financial assistance from The Department of Education and Culture, Montserrat Moments Inn. and R.W. Griffith Investments Ltd. Design and layout by KiMAGIC.

2007 – Love Labor Liberation in Lasana M. Sekou by Howard A. Fergus. In this literary study, “The writings of Lasana M. Sekou were compared to the works of a range of poets, from Aimé Césaire to Oswald Mtshali, from Kamau Brathwaite to Dylan Thomas, from e.e. cummings to Linton Kwesi Johnson, but Fergus insists that ‘the voice that reaches us is sui generis, unique and Sekouesque.’” Published by House of Nehesi Publishers. ISBN 978-0-913441-87-9.

2007 – St. Patrick's Co-Operative Credit Union Fifty Years of Golden Service 1957 – 2007. "A must read story of a Co-Operative Credit Union which was launched in 1957. It transformed the lives of people at the grassroots, helped them to cope with violent storms of wind and fire and is still fuelling national development in the twenty-first century." Includes the works of several photographers including Kingsley Howe and Igor Kravtchenko. First published in 2007 by the University of West Indies, School of Continuing Studies, Montserrat. ISBN 978-976-8018-11-3.

2007 – Montserrat: Defining Moments ... "offers valuable information and insights on the events and persons that have given direction and character to a unique people called Montserratians. It is another source of material on a small country that had braved many challenges but refuses to be cowed into defeat" – Dr. Hon Lowell L. Lewis. The book includes many colourful images of Montserrat and its people; designed by Igor Kravtchenko and published by KiMAGIC in 2007. ISBN 978-0-973-6950-7-6.

2008 – I Believe by Howard A. Fergus. In her review of this poetry collection, Bahamian author, human rights advocate Marion Bethel: “In the clean lyric line, the rhyming line,” there is “an honest, unsentimental perception of humanity. From a freshly-wrought volcanic landscape, Fergus speaks authentically, deeply.” Published by House of Nehesi Publishers. ISBN 978-0-913441-95-4.

2008 – Death In The Family E.A. Markham 1939–2008. Book written in memory of Edward Archibald Markham, Professor of Creative Writing, Sheffield Hallam University. Published by Fergus Publications Ltd. with assistance from The Montserrat Foundation Inc and The Ministry of Culture of Montserrat in 2008 and University of West Indies School of Continuing Studies Montserrat, and Igor Kravtchenko for special assistance. The book was designed by KiMAGIC; first published in 2008. ISBN 978-976-95223-0-5.

2010 – The Arrow Poems and Saturday Soup. A collection of poems designated for Alphonsus "Arrow" Cassell 1949–2010. First published in 2010 by Fergus Publications; book design by Igor Kravtchenko and special assistance from Fiona Meade and members of Lime Tree Lane for ideas for poems. ISBN 978-976-95223-1-2.

2011 – Poems From Behind God Back. Book of poems dedicated to Fernella Barzey (1947–2010). "Profound and penetrating", these poems come from a wealth of experience and a depth of feeling, in "conversational muscular rhythms". The book was designed by KiMAGIC; first published by Fergus Publications Ltd, 2011. ISBN 978-976-95223-2-9.

2011 – Tongues On Fire: A History of The Pentecostal Movement of Montserrat; ... "highlights the struggles and conquests of the persons who pioneered the Pentecostal Movement in Montserrat, thereby making the island the cradle of the Pentecostal Assemblies of the West Indies". Published by Fergus Publications, for the Montserrat District of the Pentecostal Assemblies of the West Indies in 2011; book design and prepress by KiMAGIC. ISBN 978-976-95223-3-6.

2012 – Obama and other poems - a collection of poems that celebrate icons, starting with Barack Obama, published by Arawak Publications, Jamaica. ISBN 978-976-95421-6-7.

2014 – A Cloud of Witnessess: Some Pentecostal Pastors of Montserrat. "The book dedicated to Bishop Abrahamand Frances Riley For Faithful Service They carried the Pentecostal Torch with honour". The book was published by Fergus Publications Ltd. Olveson, Montserrat with Financial Contribution from: Reuel Francis (Boston and Montserrat), Faith Tabernacle Pentecostal Church, Abundant Life Fellowship of Edgewater Park (New Jersey, US), Shipoh Pentecostal Church (Salem, Montserrrat), Victoria Road Evangelical Church (Birmingham, UK), Church of Good Prophecy (Montserrat), Faith Christian Church (Massachusetts, US), Shiloh Revival Tabernacle and Shilon Tottenham Assembly (London, UK). The book was designed by KiMAGIC; first published in 2014. ISBN 978-976-95223-5-0.

2021 – Pandemic Moments by Yvonne Weekes & Howard A Fergus. According UWI professor Curwen Best, in this collection, “The employment of allusion and metaphor is noteworthy, and the enlisting of historical and religious reference (as in Fergus’ ‘Out of Nowhere’ and Weekes’ ‘Good Friday’) helps to contextualise themes of the collection, such as isolation and preservation.” Independently published. ISBN 979-8735111108.

== See also ==
- Caribbean literature
