= Edison Masisi =

Botswana politician (1921–2003)

Edison Setlhomo Keitshoketswe Masisi

Minister of Education, Labour and Social Services
- In office 1969–1971

Minister of Mineral Resources and Water Affairs
- In office 1957–1964

Personal details
- Born: 31 March 1921 Moshupa, Bechuanaland Protectorate
- Died: 14 February 2003 (aged 81) Gaborone, Botswana
- Party: Botswana Democratic Party
- Education: Tiger Kloof

Edison Setlhomo Keitshoketswe Masisi (31 March 1921 – 14 February 2003) was a politician and diplomat in Botswana and he is the father of the former President of Botswana, Mokgweetsi Masisi. He served as member of parliament of Moshupa between 1965 and 1999. Masisi attended Tiger Kloof along with future president Quett Masire. After qualifying as a teacher, he taught at Moshupa (1950-1964), which he served as head teacher (1957-1964). In 1964, he resigned to contest the Moshupa seat on the BDP ticket. The following year, he won in the election and was appointed assistant Minister of Education, Labour and Social Services. He served as the second minister of state for Foreign Affairs in the Office of the President from 1969–1971. He was moved to the Ministry of Education in 1972 and later or Ministry of Health (1978-1979). In 1989, he was elected as the deputy speaker of the National Assembly, where remained in the position until 1999. In 1993, he was appointed assistant Minister of Finance and Development Planning. He retired from active politics in 1999.

Political offices
Preceded by Moutlakgola P.K. Nwako	Minister of Foreign Affairs; 1969–1971	Succeeded by Bakwana Kgosidintsi Kgari
