= 1999 Botswana local elections =

Local elections in Botswana were held on 16 October 1999 for the district councils of the Districts of Botswana. Local government is administered by nine district and five town councils. District commissioners have executive authority.

== Overall Results ==
Party	Seats
Botswana Democratic Party	303
Botswana National Front	80
Botswana Congress Party	13
Botswana Alliance Movement	9
Total	405
Registered Voters	458,269
Total Voters (Voter Turnout)	347,192 (75.8%)
Invalid Votes	15,064
Total Valid Votes	332,128

== Results By District ==
=== Central District ===
Party	Seats
Botswana Democratic Party	104
Botswana Congress Party	1
Botswana Alliance Movement	1
Total	106
Registered Voters	134,551
Total Voters (Voter Turnout)	94,715 (70.4%)
Invalid Votes	5,510
Total Valid Votes	89,205

=== Francistown City ===
Party	Seats
Botswana Democratic Party	14
Botswana Alliance Movement	2
Total	16
Registered Voters	22,702
Total Voters (Voter Turnout)	16,919 (74.5%)
Invalid Votes	372
Total Valid Votes	16,547

=== Gaborone City ===
Party	Seats
Botswana National Front	18
Botswana Democratic Party	7
Total	25
Registered Voters	38,560
Total Voters (Voter Turnout)	29,169 (75.6%)
Invalid Votes	583
Total Valid Votes	28,586

=== Ghanzi District ===
Party	Seats
Botswana Democratic Party	15
Botswana National Front	3
Total	18
Registered Voters	10,476
Total Voters (Voter Turnout)	8,101 (77.3%)
Invalid Votes	425
Total Valid Votes	7,676

=== Jwaneng ===
Party	Seats
Botswana National Front	7
Total	7
Registered Voters	4,526
Total Voters (Voter Turnout)	3,487 (77.0%)
Invalid Votes	58
Total Valid Votes	3,429

=== Kgalagadi District ===
Party	Seats
Botswana Democratic Party	13
Botswana National Front	7
Total	20
Registered Voters	14,625
Total Voters (Voter Turnout)	11,984 (81.9%)
Invalid Votes	468
Total Valid Votes	11,516

=== Kgatleng District ===
Party	Seats
Botswana Democratic Party	12
Botswana National Front	6
Botswana Congress Party	3
Total	21
Registered Voters	22,409
Total Voters (Voter Turnout)	17,847 (79.6%)
Invalid Votes	617
Total Valid Votes	17,230

=== Kweneng District ===
Party	Seats
Botswana Democratic Party	42
Botswana National Front	7
Botswana Congress Party	1
Total	50
Registered Voters	58,646
Total Voters (Voter Turnout)	46,438 (79.2%)
Invalid Votes	2,064
Total Valid Votes	44,374

=== Lobatse ===
Party	Seats
Botswana National Front	9
Botswana Democratic Party	2
Total	11
Registered Voters	9,870
Total Voters (Voter Turnout)	7,758 (78.6%)
Invalid Votes	154
Total Valid Votes	7,604

=== North-East District ===
Party	Seats
Botswana Democratic Party	15
Botswana Alliance Movement	2
Total	17
Registered Voters	14,115
Total Voters (Voter Turnout)	11,038 (78.2%)
Invalid Votes	489
Total Valid Votes	10,549

There was a tie in one ward and a by-election was held on 29 January 2000. The BDP candidate won, bringing their total to 15 seats.

=== North-West District ===
Party	Seats
Botswana Democratic Party	30
Botswana Congress Party	6
Botswana Alliance Movement	4
Total	40
Registered Voters	44,490
Total Voters (Voter Turnout)	34,201 (76.9%)
Invalid Votes	1,889
Total Valid Votes	32,312

=== Selibe Phikwe ===
Party	Seats
Botswana Democratic Party	11
Botswana Congress Party	2
Total	13
Registered Voters	17,887
Total Voters (Voter Turnout)	13,567 (75.8%)
Invalid Votes	252
Total Valid Votes	13,315

=== South-East District ===
Party	Seats
Botswana Democratic Party	13
Botswana National Front	5
Total	18
Registered Voters	12,659
Total Voters (Voter Turnout)	9,871 (78.0%)
Invalid Votes	409
Total Valid Votes	9,462

=== Southern District ===
Party	Seats
Botswana Democratic Party	26
Botswana National Front	18
Total	44
Registered Voters	52,753
Total Voters (Voter Turnout)	42,097 (79.8%)
Invalid Votes	1,774
Total Valid Votes	40,323
