= Eric Molebatsi =

Motswana former footballer

Personal information
- Full name: Eric Molebatsi
- Place of birth: Botswana
- Position: Midfielder

Senior career*
Years	Team	Apps	(Gls)
2001–2002	Botswana Meat Commission		
2002–2004	TAFIC		
2004–	Nico United		

International career
2002–2004	Botswana	4	(0)
- * Club domestic league appearances and goals

Eric Molebatsi is a Motswana former footballer. He hails from the Letlhakeng sub-district of Botswana and was active up till 2011. Between 2002 and 2004, he also played for the Botswana national football team.

== Playing career ==
Molebatsi began his playing career in 2002 during which he played for clubs such as NICO FC (2007-2009, and Motlakase (2010). He also represented Botswana at the 2004 COSAFA Cup. He last played for Satmos FC in 22011 after which he retired

== See also ==
- Botswana National Football team
- COSAFA Cup
