= Kopong =

- city
- Location in Botswana
- Coordinates: 24°28′7″S 25°53′32″E
- Country: Botswana
- District: Kweneng District

Population (2011 census)
  - Total: 9,320

Kopong is a small village in Kweneng District of Botswana. It is located around 25 km north of Gaborone, the capital of Botswana. The population was 5,571 in 2001 census and 9,520 at the 2011 census, making it the sixth largest settlement in Kweneng. It is now becoming a suburb of Gaborone agglomeration home to 421,907 inhabitants at the 2011 census. Some of the well known sites include the Gospel Of God's Grace Ministries, a popular church led by Prophet Cedric Kobedi where thousands gather weekly to worship.

== See also ==
- List of cities in Botswana
