= Phenyo Butale =

Botswana politician and diplomat

- Butale in 2025

Minister of International Relations
- Incumbent
- Assumed office 11 November 2024
- President: Duma Boko
- Preceded by: Lemogang Kwape

Member of Parliament for Gaborone Central
- Incumbent
- Assumed office 30 October 2024
- Preceded by: Tumisang Healy
- Majority: 2,381 (20.5%)
- In office 24 October 2014 – 28 August 2019
- Preceded by: Dumelang Saleshando
- Succeeded by: Tumisang Healy

Personal details
- Party: Alliance for Progressives
- Other political affiliations: Botswana Movement for Democracy (until 2017); Umbrella for Democratic Change (2014–2017; since 2024)
- Education: University of Botswana (BA, MA); Stellenbosch University (PhD)
- Occupation: Politician, journalist

Academic background
- Thesis: Discourses of Poverty in Literature: Assessing Representations of Indigence in Post-colonial Texts from Botswana, Namibia and Zimbabwe (2015)
- Doctoral advisor: Tina Steiner; Annie Gagiano (co-supervisor)

Academic work
- Discipline: English studies
- Sub-discipline: Postcolonial literature

Phenyo Butale is a Motswana politician and former journalist who has served as Minister of International Relations since November 2024. A member of the Alliance for Progressives (AP), he has represented Gaborone Central in the National Assembly since 2024, having previously held the seat from 2014 to 2019.

Before entering politics, Butale worked in broadcasting and led press-freedom organisations in Botswana and South Africa. He was elected to Parliament on the Umbrella for Democratic Change (UDC) ticket in 2014, later joined the AP following a split in the Botswana Movement for Democracy (BMD), and returned to Parliament when the AP contested the 2024 election as part of the UDC.

== Early life and education ==
Butale comes from Moroka, a village in Botswana's North-East District. He studied at the University of Botswana, where he obtained bachelor's and master's degrees. In the 1990s he began university studies and later undertook doctoral research at Stellenbosch University in South Africa.

He completed a PhD in English studies at Stellenbosch in 2015. His dissertation examined portrayals of poverty in southern African literature.

== Media and civil society career ==
Butale worked for Radio Botswana as a news writer, newsreader and English-language editor. He also produced and presented the international current-affairs programme Around the World Today and worked in broadcasting at Botswana Television. During his broadcasting career he covered presidential activities and foreign visits, including those of Presidents Festus Mogae and Ian Khama.

From 2011 to 2012, Butale was national director of the Botswana chapter of the Media Institute of Southern Africa (MISA), where he campaigned for freedom of information and reforms to broadcasting regulation. Between 2013 and 2014, he was executive director of the Freedom of Expression Institute in Johannesburg, which advocated freedom of expression and access to information in South Africa.

== Political career ==
=== First term in Parliament (2014–2019) ===
Butale entered electoral politics as the UDC candidate for Gaborone Central at the 2014 Botswana general election. He won the constituency defeating incumbent Botswana Congress Party leader Dumelang Saleshando by a majority of 874.

During his first parliamentary term, Butale served on committees dealing with finance and information and communications technology. He represented Botswana in the Pan-African Parliament and headed the country's parliamentary delegation there. In 2018 he sought the presidency of the Pan-African Parliament, receiving the endorsement of Botswana's National Assembly and support from the government of Lesotho, despite his status as an opposition MP.

Butale was initially a member of the BMD, one of the UDC's constituent parties. At the BMD's disputed July 2017 congress in Bobonong, he was elected secretary-general by the faction supporting Ndaba Gaolathe. This faction subsequently established the Alliance for Progressives, which Butale joined.

In November 2018, he introduced an urgent parliamentary motion seeking measures to cushion consumers against successive fuel-price increases. The motion was defeated by 19 votes to 13.

=== Political wilderness (2019–2024) ===
At the 2019 Botswana general election, Butale stood for re-election in Gaborone Central as the AP candidate, while the UDC nominated Mpho Pheko. He finished third behind Botswana Democratic Party candidate Tumisang Healy and Pheko respectively.

He continued as a senior AP official and was its secretary-general in 2022, when the party was negotiating cooperation with other opposition groups. In January 2024, the AP formally joined the UDC, with Butale speaking for the party when the agreement was announced. Butale successfully contested Gaborone Central under the coalition's banner at the 2024 Botswana general election and defeated Pheko by a large majority of 2,381.

=== Minister of International Relations (2024–present) ===
On 11 November 2024, President Duma Boko appointed Butale Minister of International Relations following the UDC's victory in the general election, succeeding Lemogang Kwape. In March 2025, Butale outlined a foreign-policy approach based on non-alignment, the peaceful settlement of disputes, multilateral cooperation and economic development. He also argued that Botswana should take a more active role in international affairs despite its relatively small population. In June 2025, he participated in the annual EU–Botswana Partnership Dialogue, which addressed trade, human rights, governance and regional economic development. In September 2026, ahead of the United Nations General Assembly, he called for reform of the United Nations system and reaffirmed Botswana's support for sovereignty, territorial integrity and a rules-based international order.
