= Liakat Kablay =

Botswana politician (died 2024)

Liakat Kablay (died 2 October 2024) was a politician from Botswana. He was the Member of Parliament for Letlhakeng-Lephephe from 2009 until his death and served as the Botswana Democratic Party Chief Whip.
