= Speaker of the Legislative Assembly of Montserrat =

Presiding officer of the Legislative Assembly of Montserrat

The Speaker is the presiding officer of the Legislative Assembly of Montserrat. The Speaker is elected by MPs, and does not have to be an Assembly member. There is also a Deputy Speaker, who is elected by MPs from amongst their own numbers, although they cannot also be a member of the cabinet.

== List of speakers ==
Name	Term start	Term end	Notes
Howard Fergus	1975	2001	
Joseph Meade	2001	2009	
Sir Howard Fergus	October 2009	6 April 2010	Acting Speaker
Teresina Bodkin	6 April 2010	2014	
Sir Howard Fergus	2014	23 January 2015	Acting Speaker
Shirley Osborne	23 January 2015	17 December 2019	
Teresina Bodkin	17 December 2019	20 December 2020	
Charliena White	20 December 2020	8 November 2024	
Marjorie Smith	8 November 2024	Incumbent	
