= Bakwana Kgosidintsi Kgari =

Motswana politician (1921–1977)

Bakwena Kgosidintsi Kgari

foreign minister
- In office 1971–1974

Minister of Education

Personal details
- Born: 29 October 1921 Serowe, Bechuanaland Protectorate
- Died: 16 May 1977 (aged 55)
- Party: Botswana Democratic Party

Bakwena Kgosidintsi Kgari (29 October 1921 – 16 May 1977) was a former politician and diplomat in Botswana. Kgari served as the third foreign minister of Botswana from 1971 to 1974.

Political offices
Preceded by Edison Masisi	Foreign Minister of Botswana; 1971–1974	Succeeded by Archibald Mogwe
