= Charliena White =

Speaker for Montserrat Assembly

Speaker of the Legislative Assembly of Montserrat
- In office 20 December 2020 – 8 November 2024
- Preceded by: Teresina Bodkin
- Succeeded by: Marjorie Smith

Charliena White is a Montserratian politician. She was the Speaker of the Legislative Assembly of Montserrat from 2020 to 2024.

== See also ==
- List of speakers of the Legislative Council of Montserrat
