= Ministry of International Relations (Botswana) =

Government ministry of Botswana

Ministry overview
- Type: Foreign ministry
- Jurisdiction: Botswana
- Motto: "Promoting Botswana's interests abroad"
- Minister responsible: Phenyo Butale
- Website: www.mofaic.gov.bw

Botswana's Ministry of International Relations is a department of the government of Botswana responsible for managing the country's diplomatic relations with other countries and international organizations. This mandate includes political, economic, and social/cultural relations.

== Departments ==
- Department of Protocol and Consular Services
- Department of Africa and the Middle East
- Department of Asia and Pacific Affairs
- Department of Multilateral Affairs
- Department of Public Relations, Research and Information
- Department of Europe and Americas
- Department of Corporate Services
- 23 Missions (Embassies/High Commissions and Consulates) abroad: Pretoria, Johannesburg, Windhoek, Maputo, Harare, Lusaka, Nairobi, Addis Ababa, Kuwait, Canberra, New Delhi, Beijing, Tokyo, Brussels, Berlin, Stockholm, Geneva, London, Washington DC, New York, Abuja, Brasilia and Paris.

== Foreign ministers of Botswana ==
Picture	Name	Took office	Left office
	Moutlakgola P.K. Nwako	30 September 1966	1969
	Edison Masisi	1969	1971
	Bakwana Kgosidintsi Kgari	1971	1974
	Archibald Mogwe	1974	14 September 1984
	Gaositwe K. T. Chiepe	14 September 1984	25 October 1994
	Mompati Merafhe	25 October 1994	1 April 2008
	Phandu Skelemani	1 April 2008	31 October 2014
	Pelonomi Venson-Moitoi	31 October 2014	2018
	Vincent T. Seretse	2018	2018
	Unity Dow	2 November 2018	26 August 2020
	Lemogang Kwape	26 August 2020	1 November 2024
	Phenyo Butale	11 November 2024	present
