= Margaret Nasha =

Botswana politician (born 1947)

Speaker of the National Assembly of Botswana
- In office October 2009 – October 2014
- Preceded by: Patrick Balopi
- Succeeded by: Gladys Kokorwe

Member of Parliament for Gaborone Central
- In office 1999–2004
- Preceded by: Michael Dingake
- Succeeded by: Dumelang Saleshando

Personal details
- Born: 6 August 1947 (age 78) Kanye, Bechuanaland
- Party: Alliance for Progressives
- Other political affiliations: Botswana Democratic Party (until 2016); Botswana Movement for Democracy (2016–2017)

Margaret Nnananyana Nasha (born 6 August 1947) is a Botswana politician who served as the Speaker of the National Assembly from 2009 to 2014. She was the first woman to hold the position.

== Career ==
Nasha worked as a journalist and civil servant before entering politics, and also served a term as Botswana's High Commissioner to the United Kingdom. She entered the National Assembly at the 1994 general election, and subsequently served as a minister in the governments of Quett Masire and Festus Mogae. A representative of the Botswana Democratic Party (BDP), Nasha was elected to the speakership after the 2009 election. After a falling out with President Ian Khama, she lost the BDP speakership nomination to Gladys Kokorwe in 2014, and in 2016 defected to the opposition Botswana Movement for Democracy.

== Early life ==
Nasha was born in Kanye, the traditional capital of the Ngwaketse people. Her official date of birth is 6 August 1947, but she has expressed doubts as to its accuracy. One of ten siblings, Nasha spent her early childhood in Johannesburg, South Africa, living with an older sister. She returned to Botswana to attend primary school in the village of Mmathethe. In her autobiography, Nasha recalled that girls at the time were only taught to read and write in order to be able to correspond with their future husbands, who it was presumed would have to migrate to South Africa to earn a living.

Because Nasha's father had died at an early age, her mother turned to her male relatives to help finance her daughter's schooling. They reluctantly sold some of their cattle to allow her to finish her secondary education. After leaving school, Nasha moved to Gaborone (Botswana's capital) to take classes at the University of Botswana. She also found a job in the studios of Radio Botswana, and was later promoted to the newsroom. Nasha worked as a political reporter for a number of years, but eventually left journalism to join the civil service. Her professional progression included her appointment as Director of the Department of Information and Broadcasting Services. She also served in the diplomatic service as a Botswana's High Commissioner to the United Kingdom.

== Politics ==
=== 1994–2009 ===
A member of the ruling Botswana Democratic Party (BDP), Nasha entered parliament in October 1994, after the 1994 general election. She did not stand at the election, but was rather appointed to one of the four seats reserved for the nominees of the sitting president (Quett Masire). A few years later, President Masire appointed her to his ministry, with responsibility for local government, lands, and housing. She was retained as a minister when Masire was replaced by Festus Mogae in April 1998. At the 1999 general election, Nasha won the seat of Gaborone Central, defeating Michael Dingake of the Botswana Congress Party (BCP). Her afforded her been brought into Parliament under the Specially Elected dispensation by President Festus Mogae. She was defeated by Dumelang Saleshando, another BCP candidate, at the 2004 election, but was able to remain in parliament as a nominee of President Mogae.

=== 2009–present ===
After the 2009 general election, Nasha won the BDP nomination for the speakership. She was elected to the position unopposed, and became the first woman to hold the position. During her time as speaker, Nasha took steps to strengthen Botswana's separation of powers, refusing several orders from the executive branch in order to demonstrate the independence of parliament. These actions brought her into conflict with President Ian Khama, as did a portion of her autobiography (published while in office) which criticised his leadership style. In April 2014, Khama considered attempting to have Nasha removed from the speakership through a no-confidence motion, but was talked out of it by his advisors, who said he would likely be unsuccessful.

In November 2014, following the 2014 general election, the BDP refused to re-nominate Nasha as speaker and instead nominated Gladys Kokorwe (President Khama's preferred candidate). Nasha was re-nominated by the opposition, but was defeated by Kokorwe by a 41–21 margin. Nasha was also a BDP member, but had fallen out with President Khama. Before the speakership election occurred, there had been a dispute over whether the vote should be taken by voice (the government's preference) or by secret ballot (Nasha's preference). The attorney-general, representing the government, argued that Nasha had ceased to become speaker on the day of the election and thus no longer had a say over parliamentary procedure, but a court ruling rejected this argument.

In January 2016, Nasha resigned from the BDP to join the opposition Botswana Movement for Democracy (BMD), which forms part of a broader alliance, the Umbrella for Democratic Change (UDC).

== See also ==
- List of female speakers of national and territorial unicameral parliaments
