= Maitlhoko Mooka =

Motswana politician

- Born: Maitlhoko G. K. Mooka
- Occupation: Politician

Maitlhoko G. K. Mooka is a Motswana politician who served as a member of the Pan-African Parliament for Botswana and the Parliament of Botswana for Moshupa/Manyana until 2009. He is a member of the Botswana Democratic Party.
