= Botswana Workers Front =

- Abbreviation: BWF
- Leader: Shawn Nthaile
- Founded: September 1993
- Split from: Botswana National Front
- Headquarters: Mahalapye
- Ideology: Nationalism; Christian democracy
- Political position: Centre
- National affiliation: Botswana National Front

The Botswana Workers Front was a political party in Botswana. The party was founded by Shawn Nthaile in September 1993 at a special congress in Mahalapye, following his departure from the Botswana National Front. Nthaile charged that he had been kept out of senior positions in BNF due to his ethnic affiliation. Through the BWF Nthaile sought to promote the interests of labourers and his own Bakgalagadi ethnic group. The symbol of BWF was the hammer and sickle. The party was based in Jwaneng. At the time of the 1994 parliamentary election BWF joined the United Democratic Front, a coalition of parties opposed to both the Botswana Democratic Party (BDP) and the BNF. No BWF nor any other UDF candidate was able to get elected.

BWF allowed members to hold dual BWF and BNF memberships.

Mothusi Akanyang was the founding president of BWF. She died in 2005. At the time, Nthaile served as deputy president of the party.
