= Kumakwane =

Kumakwane Blom K
- Village
- Nickname: Lekuma
- Location in Botswana
- Coordinates: 24°39′23″S 25°41′55″E
- Country: Botswana
- District: Kweneng District

Government
  - Kgosi: Chomie Seboni

Population (2011)
  - Total: 5,545

Kumakwane is a village in Kweneng District of Botswana. It is located 25 km west of the capital of Botswana, Gaborone. The population was 9,595 in 2011 census.
