= United Democratic Front (Botswana) =

- Abbreviation: UDF
- Founded: 1994
- Ideology: Democratic socialism Social democracy
- Political position: Left-wing

The United Democratic Front (UDF) was a coalition of opposition parties in Botswana, formed ahead of the 1994 parliamentary election. The UDF consisted of the MELS Movement of Botswana, the Botswana Workers Front and the Social Democratic Party. UDF opposed both the ruling Botswana Democratic Party and opposition Botswana National Front. No UDF candidate was able to get elected.
