= Michael Dingake =

Botswanan politician (1928–2024)

President of the Botswana Congress Party
- In office 20 June 1998 – July 2001
- Preceded by: Position established
- Succeeded by: Otlaadisa Koosaletse

Member of Parliament for Gaborone Central
- In office 19 October 1994 – 26 August 1999
- Preceded by: Constituency established
- Succeeded by: Margaret Nasha

Personal details
- Born: Michael Kitso Dingake; 11 February 1928 Bobonong, Bechuanaland Protectorate (now Botswana)
- Died: 7 April 2024 (aged 96)
- Party: Botswana Congress Party
- Other political affiliations: Botswana National Front (1992–1998); African National Congress
- Profession: Anti-apartheid activist Writer

Michael Kitso Dingake (11 February 1928 – 7 April 2024) was a Botswana political activist, writer and founding president of the Botswana Congress Party.

== Biography ==
=== Education ===
Dingake commenced his educational journey at Bobonong Primary School, where he pursued his studies from 1936 to 1941. He studied at South Africa for his secondary education, enrolling at St Ansgars Institution, Roodepoort, from 1942 to 1943, and later at Pax College in Polokwane in 1946. He obtained his senior certificate through private studies at Damelin College in Johannesburg.

During his time of adversity, while incarcerated on Robben Island, he furthered his education, earning three degrees: a BA in Political Science and Economics, a BA in Public Administration and Local Government Accounting, and a B.Com in Business Economics and Accounting.

=== Career and Activism ===
Dingake's journey in activism commenced in 1952 when he joined the African National Congress (ANC) during the Defiance Campaign. Over the years, he assumed various roles within the movement, from serving as the secretary of the Alexandra Branch in 1957 to being appointed to the ANC National Secretariat.

In addition to his involvement with the ANC, Dingake also became a member of the South African Communist Party (SACP) during the State of Emergency in 1960 following the Sharpeville Massacre. His role extended to the military wing of the ANC, ukhonto we Sizwe (MK), where he played a pivotal role in recruitment and operations.

Despite facing tremendous personal risk, Dingake continued his activism, even after relocating back to Botswana in 1965. However, his journey took a dark turn when he was betrayed and subsequently arrested while passing through Rhodesia in 1965. Subjected to brutal torture by South African authorities, he endured immense suffering before being sentenced to 15 years on Robben Island.

Following his release, Dingake transitioned into a new phase of his life, dedicating himself to academia and community development projects at the University of Botswana. His passion for politics remained steadfast, leading him to become a prominent figure within the Botswana National Front (BNF) and later the splinter Botswana Congress Party. He was the Member of Parliament for Gaborone Central from 1994 to 1999.

After his retirement from national politics in 2004, Dingake continued to contribute to society as an author, commentator and weekly commentator for the Mmegi newspaper.

=== Death ===
Dingake died on 7 April 2024, at the age of 96.
