= Letlhakeng-Lephephe =

Botswana constituency

Letlhakeng-Lephephe is number 45

Letlhakeng-Lephephe is a constituency represented in the National Assembly of Botswana.

It was represented by Liakat Kablay.

== Description ==
The constituency is named after the settlements of Letlhakeng and Lephephe. Residents reportedly have a low standard of living.

== Members of Parliament ==
Key: BPP BDP

Election	Winner
2009 election	Liakat Kablay
2014 election	Liakat Kablay
2019 election	Liakat Kablay

== See also ==
- Parliamentary constituencies of the 2014 Botswana general elections
