= Boatlaname =

Boatlaname BO
- Village
- Nickname: viatnum
- Location in Botswana
- Coordinates: 23°36′11″S 25°49′20″E
- Country: Botswana
- District: Kweneng District

Population (2001)
  - Total: 770

Boatlaname is a village in Kweneng District of Botswana. The population of Boatlaname was 770 in 2001 census.
