= Lephephe =

- Village
- Location in Botswana
- Coordinates: 23°21′34″S 25°51′17″E
- Country: Botswana
- District: Kweneng District

Population (2001)
  - Total: 742

Lephepe, is a village in Kweneng District of Botswana. The population of Lephepe was 742 in 2001 census.

== Government and politics ==
Lephephe was part of the Letlhakeng-Lephephe constituency for elections to the National Assembly of Botswana from 2009 to 2024.
