= 1999 Botswana general election =

General election in Botswana

- 16 October 1999

40 of the 44 seats in the National Assembly 21 seats needed for a majority
- Registered: 459,663
- Turnout: 77.11% (of registered voters) (▲0.56pp); 41.98% (of eligible population) (▼2.65pp) (Note: National Study On Voter Apathy in Botswana (PDF). University of Botswana. IEC Botswana. 2022. p. 17.)
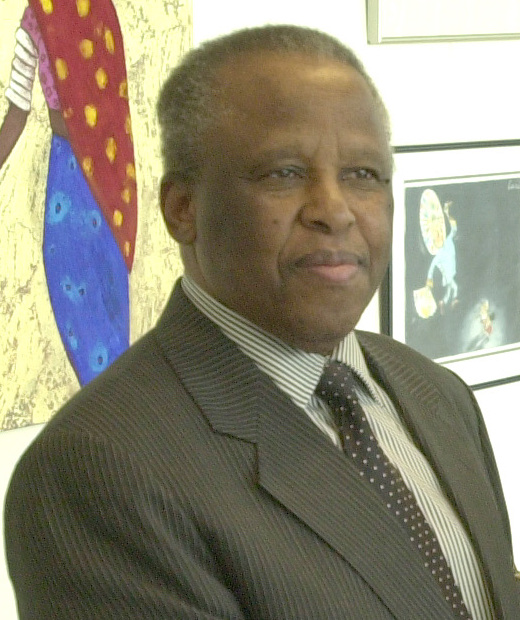

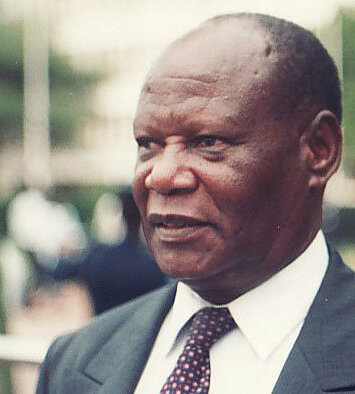
	Majority party	Minority party	Third party
			BCP
Leader	Festus Mogae	Kenneth Koma	Michael Dingake
Party	BDP	BNF	BCP
Leader's seat	None (Note: Incumbent presidents are ineligible to contest National Assembly seats; instead, they serve as ex-officio members of Parliament.)	Gaborone South	Gaborone Central (defeated)
Last election	27 seats	13 seats	0 seats
Seats won	33	6	1
Seat change	▲6	▼7	▲1
Popular vote	192,598	87,457	40,096
Percentage	57.14%	25.95%	11.90%
Swing	▲2.55pp	▼11.14pp	New
- Results by constituency
President before election
Festus Mogae
BDP
Elected President
Festus Mogae
BDP

General elections were held in Botswana on 16 October 1999, alongside local elections. The result was an eighth straight victory for the ruling Botswana Democratic Party (BDP), which increased its majority to 33 of the 40 elected seats in the National Assembly.

== Background ==
A referendum on electoral reform in 1997 had led to the creation of a new Independent Electoral Commission (IEC), the lowering of the voting age from 21 to 18, and allowing overseas citizens to vote.

Prior to the elections, the National Assembly was dissolved in late July 1999. Because fewer than half of the roughly 800,000 eligible voters had registered, it was decided in late July to introduce supplementary voter registration. On 27 August it was reported that President Festus Mogae had set the election date for 16 October. However, announcing the date invalidated the supplementary voter registration because the names of the recently registered voters had not yet been published for inspection. As a result, Mogae declared a state of emergency so that the National Assembly could meet again to amend legislation in order to allow the addition of about 60,000 people to the voters roll; this was the first time a state of emergency had been declared since Botswana became independent. A spokesman for the Botswana Electoral Commission described the situation as "very normal" and said that the election date would not be changed. The opposition Botswana Alliance Movement (BAM) and Botswana Congress Party (BCP) were critical, however, with the former's Lepetu Setshwaelo describing it as "the biggest scandal since our independence" and calling the government "totally incompetent". The BCP said that the state of emergency was unnecessary.

== Campaign ==
The main opposition party, the Botswana National Front (BNF) split in mid-1998 after party leader Kenneth Koma was suspended by the party's central committee, and then had the suspension overturned by a court ruling. After Koma returned to the party leadership, he formed a caretaker committee to remove the members who had opposed him. The excluded members subsequently left to form the BCP, which included 11 of the BNF's 13 MPs and most of its local councillors. As a result, BCP leader Michael Dingake replaced Koma as Leader of the Opposition.

Following talks that began in late 1998, the BNF, the United Action Party and five other opposition parties agreed to form the BAM in January 1999. However, the BNF had left the alliance by the end of April 1999 after the other parties refused to allow the BNF to determine the Alliance's candidates in every constituency.

The election campaign was low-key, and focussed on poverty, unemployment, wealth distribution and the country's AIDS epidemic. The BDP campaigned on a promise of prudent financial management, industrial diversification and efforts to combat the AIDS problem. The BNF criticised the government's economic policy, claiming it was too focussed on urban areas. The BCP claimed the government was too complacent, having been in power since the mid-1960s.

== Results ==
Party	Votes	%	Seats	+/–
Botswana Democratic Party	192,598	57.15	33	+6
Botswana National Front	87,457	25.95	6	–7
Botswana Congress Party	40,096	11.90	1	+1
Botswana Alliance Movement	15,806	4.69	0	New
MELS Movement of Botswana	22	0.01	0	New
Independents	1,004	0.30	0	New
Indirectly-elected seats			4	0
Total	336,983	100.00	44	0
Valid votes	336,983	95.07		
Invalid/blank votes	17,483	4.93		
Total votes	354,466	100.00		
Registered voters/turnout	459,663	77.11		
Source: EISA

== Aftermath ==
Following the elections, the National Assembly re-elected Mogae as President on 20 October.
