= Lentsweletau =

- Village
- Nickname: Majweng
- Location in Botswana
- Coordinates: 24°15′16″S 25°51′6″E
- Country: Botswana
- District: Kweneng District

Population (2011)
  - Total: 4,916

Lentsweletau is a village in Kweneng District of Botswana. It is located 60 km north of Gaborone. The population was 4,916 in 2011 census.
