= Charles Tibone =

Politician in Botswana

Mbiganyi Charles Tibone

Personal details
- Party: Botswana Democratic Party
- Education: University of Botswana, Oxford University

Mbiganyi Charles Tibone is a politician in Botswana. He was elected to the National Assembly in the October 2004 general election from the Tati West constituency and represents the governing Botswana Democratic Party. Following the election, Tibone was appointed as Minister of Minerals, Energy and Water Resources on November 9, 2004, serving in that position until January 2007, when he was instead appointed as Minister of Labour and Home Affairs. When Ian Khama took office as president on April 1, 2008, he dismissed Tibone from the Cabinet.

Tibone studied at the University of Botswana, Lesotho and Swaziland and later received a post-graduate degree on international relations, international economics and international law from Oxford University. He worked at the Ministry of Home Affairs and at a number of foreign missions before entering the private sector and becoming managing director of Gaborone Delta.
