= Marjorie Smith (Montserrat politician) =

Speaker of the Montserrat Assembly

Speaker of the Legislative Assembly of Montserrat
- Incumbent
- Assumed office 8 November 2024
- Preceded by: Charliena White

Personal details
- Party: United Alliance

Marjorie Smith is a Montserratian politician. She has been the Speaker of the Legislative Assembly of Montserrat since 2024. She is a senior civil servant.

== See also ==
- List of speakers of the Legislative Council of Montserrat
