= Thamaga =

Thamaga T-Side
- Village
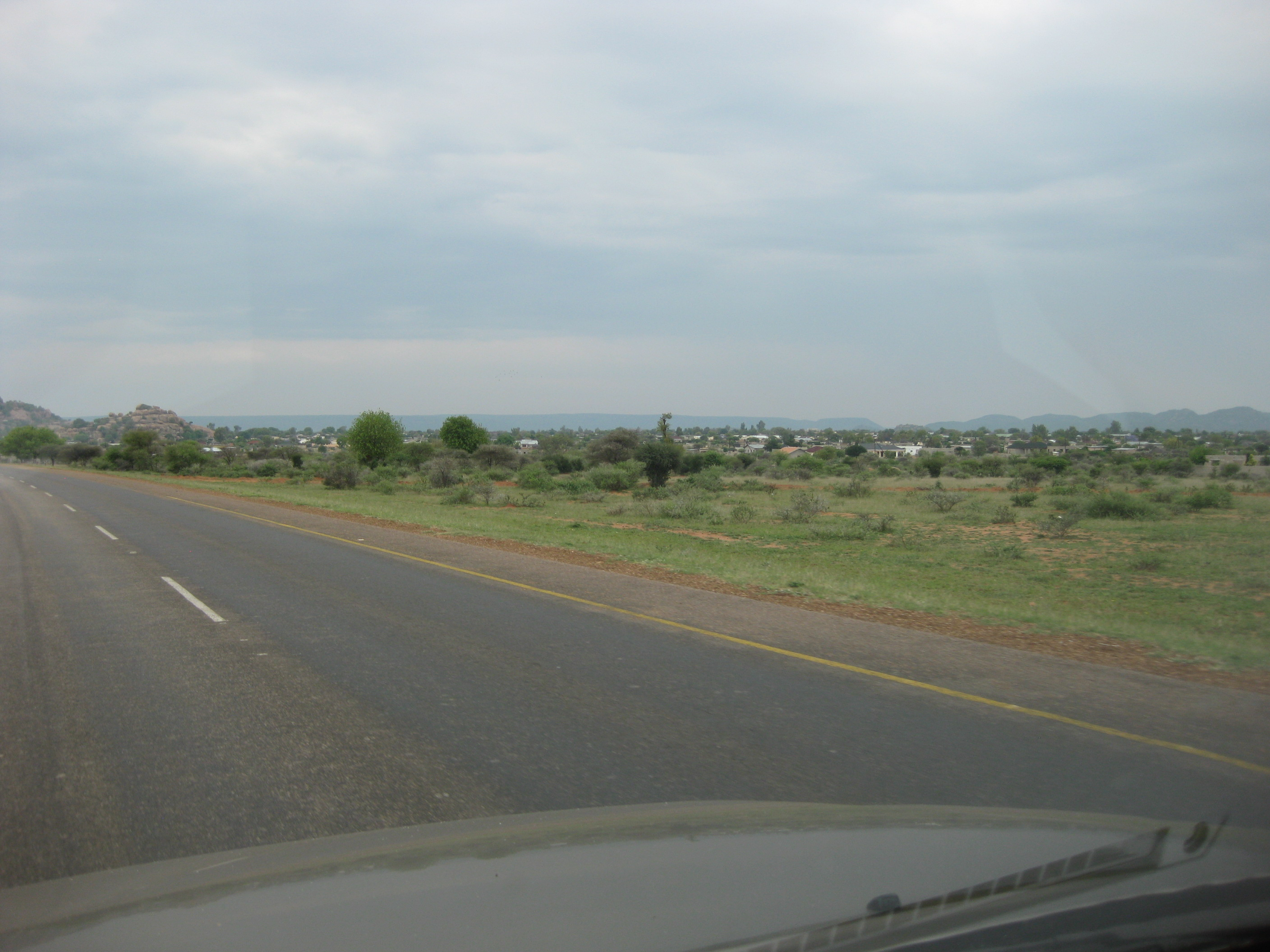
- Nickname: Ntŝa Dia Jola
- Location within Botswana
- Coordinates: 24°43′S 25°32′E
- Country: Botswana
- District: Kweneng District
- Elevation: 1,053 m (3,455 ft)

Population (2022)
  - Total: 25,297
- Time zone: GMT +2
- Climate: BSh

Thamaga is a large village located in the Kweneng District of Botswana and about 40 km west of the capital city Gaborone. It is home to 19,547 inhabitants at the 2011 census. It is becoming year by year like a suburb part of the Gaborone agglomeration.

The village is dominated by large rock formations, the largest being Thamaga Hill. Thamaga is third in the district to Molepolole and Mogoditshane in both size and population. The majority of the residents are from the Bakgatla-ba-ga-Mmanaana Tribe, and their totem is the vervet monkey (kgabo). The name Mmanaana come from the tan/white cow (Mmanaana coloring). A significant amount of archaeological research has taken place in the surrounding area over the last ~20 years, and current research is being conducted by a team from the University of California-Berkeley and the University of Botswana.

The Bakgatla-ba-ga-Mmanaana settled there in the mid-1930s and they are a break-away group and the same people as Bakgatla-ba-ga-Mmanaana in Moshupa, just 17 km to the southwest.

Most of the old village wards where the tribes men settled from Moshupa maintained the same names as the wards in Thamaga. People of any particular wards between the two villages are related and commonly use similar surnames. Even the chiefs of the two villages are of the same blood and use common names of Mosielele and Gobuamang.

The area was formerly inhabited by various groups or "Bakgalagadi" (earlier arrivals of Bantu-speaking farmers and herders) and hunter-gatherers ancestral to \he people today called San, Bushmen, and Basarwa. The history of these peoples in the Thamaga area, based on radiocarbon dating, has been traced back at least 5000 years.

Government and Infrastructure

- Service Centre- for provision of government services.
- There are three government clinics and one primary hospital.

Education

There are seven government primary schools:

- Gobuamang Memorial School
- Monare Memorial School
- Rungwana Primary School
- Western Primary School
- Magalatladi Primary School
- Nkoane Primary School
- Kontle Primary School

Three junior secondary schools:

- Thamaga Junior Secondary School
- Letlole Mosielele Junior Secondary School
- Sekgele Junior Secondary School

There is one private primary school

- Highridge, and one private secondary school
- Highridge Secondary School.

There are numerous private creches and day care centres.

== Gallery ==
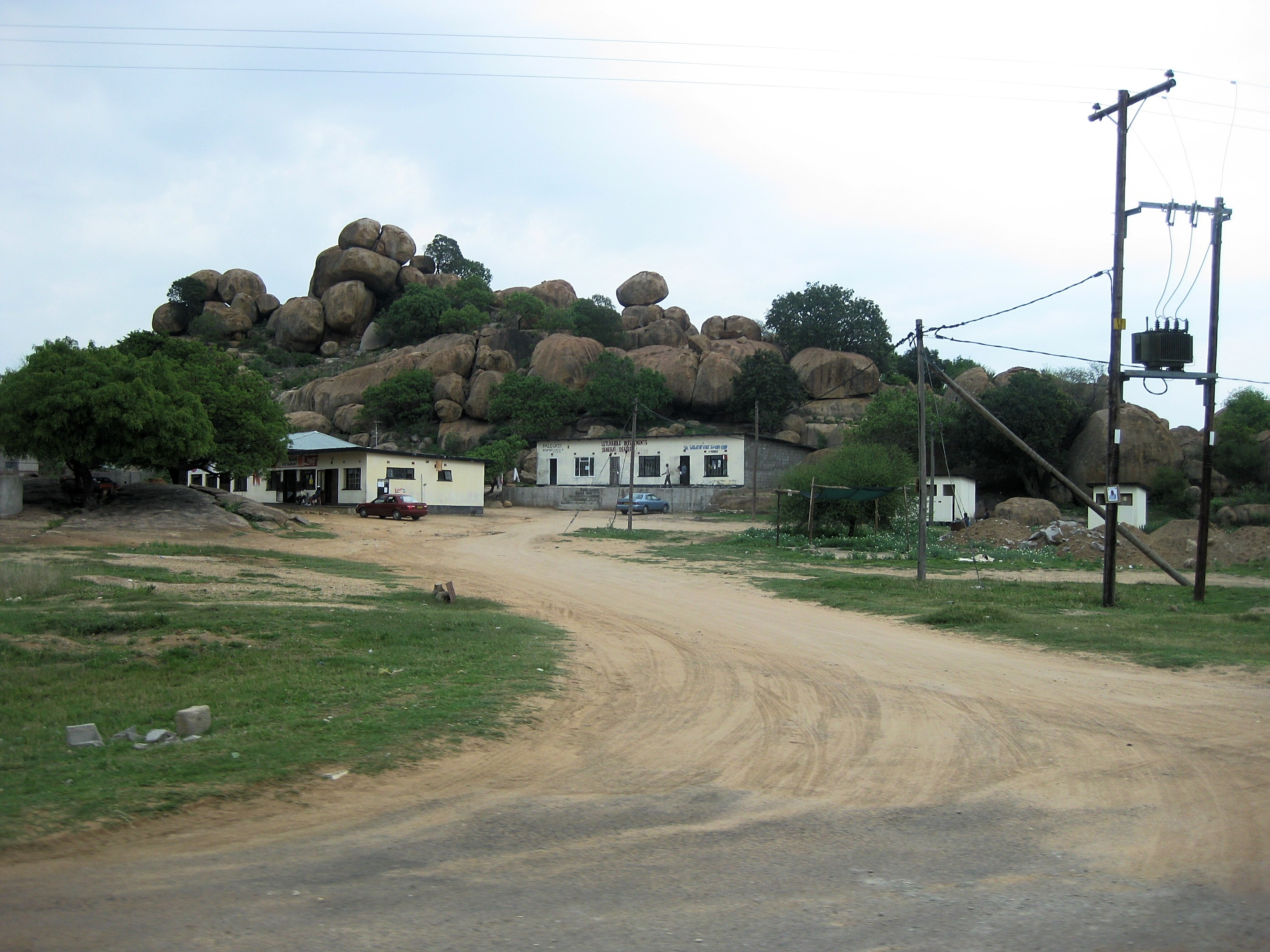
Rock formations in Thamaga

== See also ==
- List of cities in Botswana
- Mosope River
