= Teresina Bodkin =

Montserratian legislative speaker (died 2025)

- as speaker
- Born: Montserrat
- Died: April 2025; Saint John's, Montserrat
- Known for: First woman Speaker in Montserrat
- Predecessor: Joseph Meade

Teresina Bodkin (died April 2025) was a Montserratian teacher and civil servant who became the first woman Speaker of the Legislative Council of Montserrat.

== Life and career ==
Bodkin was born in Montserrat and she worked as a secondary school mathematics teacher who went on to be Montserrat's Director of Statistics. She held that role for 15 years.

On 6 April 2010, Bodkin was selected as the first female Speaker of the island's Legislative Council. Bodkin was supported in this new role by six months of training by former speaker Sir Howard Fergus. During that time Fergus returned to his former role replacing the previous speaker, Joseph Meade. Bodkin served until September 2014. On 17 December 2019, she was reelected to the position of the speaker.

Bodkin's death at the Glendon Hospital in St. John's, Montserrat was announced on 8 April 2025.

== See also ==
- List of speakers of the Legislative Council of Montserrat
