= Kweneng =

- Village
- Location in Botswana
- Coordinates: 23°53′55″S 25°57′23″E
- Country: Botswana
- District: Kweneng District

Population (2001)
  - Total: 415

Kweneng is a village in Kweneng District of Botswana. The village is located around 75 km North-northwest of Mochudi. Kweneng has a primary school and the population was 415 in 2001 census.
