= Sybil I. McLaughlin =

Caymanian politician (1928–2022)

The Honorable Sybil Ione McLaughlin MBE JP
- Born: Sybil Ione Bush; 24 August 1928; Mobile, Alabama, USA
- Died: 10 May 2022 (aged 93); South Sound, Cayman Islands
- Education: Baptist College in Managua
- Occupation: First Speaker of the Legislative Assembly (now House) Clerk-Typist for the Commissioners Office First Clerk of the Legislative Assembly First Secretary to the CI Branch of the Commonwealth Parliamentary Association Organist Teacher
- Years active: 1945 - 1996
- Employer: Government of the Cayman Islands
- Known for: Founding Member of the Business & Professional Women's Club Founding Member of the Rotary Sunrise Club Founding Member of the Cayman Islands Tennis Club
- Successor: Mabry S. Kirkconnell
- Spouse: Vivian Delworth McLaughlin (married 1949)
- Children: Christopher Vivian Delworth McLaughlin Gordon Malcolm Alfred McLaughlin
- Parent: Charles Christopher Bush Jr. Lottie Verona Bush nee Morton
- Relatives: James Alfred Bush (brother) Elizabeth Ann Bush (sister) Natascha Schroll-McLaughlin (granddaughter) Nikita Schroll-McLaughlin (granddaughter) Susanne Schroll (daughter-in-law) Heather McLaughlin (daughter-in-law)
- Honours: National Hero of the Cayman Islands: Caymanian

Sybil Ione McLaughlin (née Bush; 24 August 1928 – 10 May 2022) was a Caymanian politician who became the First Speaker of the Legislative Assembly of the Cayman Islands. She was declared a National Hero in 1996.

== Life ==
McLaughlin was born in Mobile, Alabama in 1928.

In 1945 she started working for the Government of the Cayman Islands, and when they received a constitution, she was made the clerk. During her career, her expertise was used in other parliaments. She worked at the House of Commons of the United Kingdom, Stormont House, and in the government offices of Grenada and Trinidad and Tobago.

In February 1991, she was appointed the First Speaker to the Cayman Islands Legislative Assembly. This was the Cayman Islands first woman speaker and this was achieved before the UK or the USA had their first woman speaker.

She insisted that her sons gained a good education and every Sunday she would attend the South Sound Presbyterian Church where she played the organ.

In 1996, she retired from her post and was named a National Hero of the Cayman Islands. This is the Cayman Islands' highest honor and was awarded because of her contributions to parliament and the community of the Cayman Islands. She was also one of the founding members of the Business and Professional Women’s Club, the Rotary Sunrise Club, and the Cayman Islands Tennis Club.

On 10 May 2022, she died at her son's home in South Sound. Sybil McLaughlin lay in state at the House of Parliament in the Cayman Islands on the 19th of May. Her funeral was attended the following day.
