= Letlhakeng =

Letlhakeng Lethakeng
- city
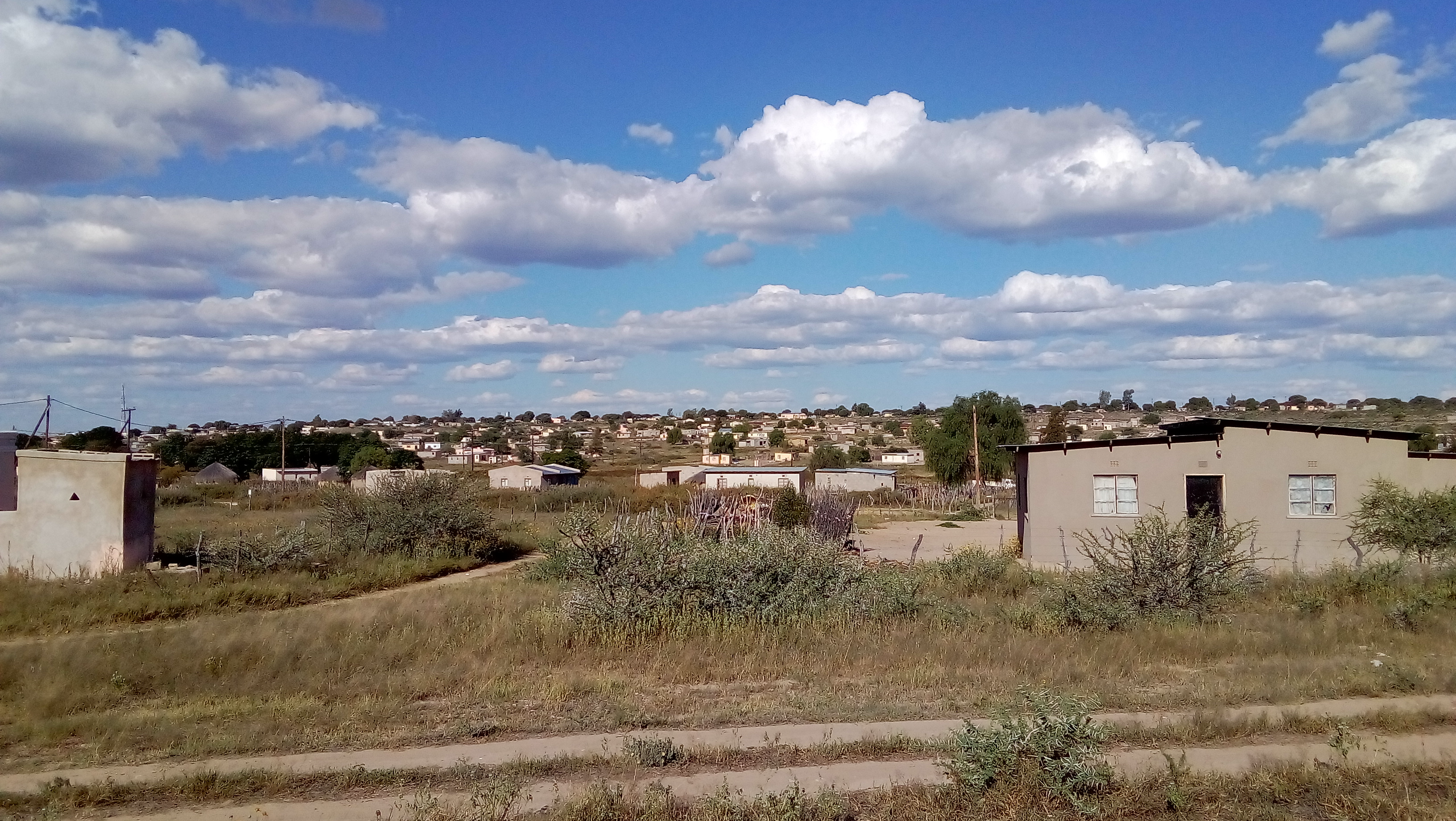
- Letlhakeng, 2020

- Location in Botswana
- Coordinates: 24°5′45″S 25°1′47″E
- Country: Botswana
- District: Kweneng District

Population (2011)
  - Total: 7,229
- Website: https://www.letlhakeng.com/

Letlhakeng or Lethakeng is an urban village in Kweneng District of Botswana. The village is located 75 km north-west of Molepolole. The population of Letlhakeng was 7,229 in the 2011 census.

The majority of the people of Letlhakeng are considered part of the Bakwena tribe, which is administered from the kgotla in Molepolole. However, aside from the Bakwena version of standard Setswana (known as Se-kwena), many people speak a version of Se-Kgalagadi - a language distinct from but related to Setswana.

Letlhakeng houses a secondary school (Mphuthe Community Secondary) which moved into new buildings in 2008 following relocation from a previous site prone to subsidence. A clinic serves the community as well as three primary schools and a number of local government offices. Until 2005, the tarred roads ended at the village centre and onward journeys were seasonally interrupted due to the gravel or sand roads. However, it is now possible to travel to most neighbouring villages without difficulty following a major road building programme.

There are three schools in Letlhakeng being;

- Letlhakeng Primary School
- Gothibamang Primary School
- Mphuthe Junior Secondary School

One of the major roads in the village is named after Bishop Frank Keikanetswe, the founder of the Seventh-day Adventist Church in the area.

== Government and politics ==
Letlhakeng was part of the Letlhakeng-Lephephe constituency for elections to the National Assembly of Botswana from 2009 to 2024.

== Notable people ==
- Eric Molebatsi, Botswanan former footballer

== See also ==
- List of cities in Botswana
