= Mary J. Lawrence =

Mary Jannet Lawrence is a Cayman politician who served as Speaker of the House during the last United Democratic Party administration. Lawrence is also a historian, educator, writer, mother of six and long-time resident of Bodden Town.

== Early life ==
Lawrence was born in Nicaragua to her parents Copeland and Otilla Boden. Her family moved to Bodden Town when she was 7 so she could attend school there.

== Career ==
Early in her career, Mary worked in both public and private schools helping children in Bodden Town receive an education. She made it her mission and worked with students in the public system who had difficulty functioning in a regular classroom setting. Along with being a teacher, she worked as a writer, editor and publisher. Alongside those careers, Lawrence and her husband were "house parents" in a home for troubled youth in Bodden Town. They fostered and consulted numerous children and families in their region.

Lawrence was one of the founding members of the Justice of the Peace Association where she served for over 30 years. She also served as the president of this organization from 1997 to 1999. Lawrence restructured the role of justices in the legal system and established a training program. She also led two units of the Commonwealth Magistrates and Judges Association Millennium Conference in Scotland in 2000. Lawrence was also a founding member of the National Counsel of Social Services as well as the president of the Drug Advisory Council, which was the forerunner of the National Drug Council. While working in social services, she helped restructure residential homes for children and young people which led to the creation of the CAYS Foundation. She worked in this program in the early days serving as a helper to get the foundation on its feet. Lawrence was also an Inspector of Prisons, member of the Immigration Board, Education Council, and a member of the Adoption Board.

In 2009, then-Premier of the Cayman Islands McKeeva Bush appointed Mary J. Lawrence to serve as Speaker of the Legislative Assembly. Following her acceptance, she was sworn in for a four-year term where she was president of the local branch of the Commonwealth Parliamentary Association. Within these positions, she hosted conferences and was a representative of the Legislative Assembly at different conferences. This was the first and "only time that that section of the Constitution allows the Legislative Assembly to draw its Speaker from the community was exercised." During this time Lawrence was charged by the governor and Cabinet to plan and execute a week-long celebration for Her Majesty's Diamond Jubilee which is a celebration home of the Cayman Islands.
