= Moshupa =

- Village
- Nickname: Mosh Ville
- Location within Botswana
- Coordinates: 24°46′45″S 25°25′06″E
- Country: Botswana
- District: Southern District
- Elevation: 1,141 m (3,743 ft)

Population (2022)
  - Total: 23 858
- Time zone: GMT +2
- Climate: BSh

Moshupa is a large village in the Southern District of Botswana with a population of 23, 858 per the 2022 census. The people of Moshupa are called the Bakgatla-ba-ga Mmanaana, a group also found in Thamaga. Along with the related Bakgatla-ba-ga Kgafela of Mochudi, they arrived to the region from the Transvaal region in South Africa throughout the eighteenth century.

Moshupa is characterised by unique and gigantic mountain outcrops which often leave visitors in wonder. The giant rocks (some up to 40 metres in radius) are so balanced on top of each other that even the villagers themselves wonder why they do not fall. They are believed to fall only when the village chief is dying, as an omen.

The chief (kgosi) of Moshupa is Kgosi Kgabosetso Mosielele. The chief currently serves in the Customary Court of Appeal and his brother, Kgosi Oscar Mosielele is the current chief of the village on his behalf. As is customary in Botswana the salutation 'kgosi' is the title used before the chiefs name.

== Religion ==
There are a large number of Christians in Moshupa. The most popular are the United Congregational Church of South Africa, the Seventh-day Adventist Church, the Assemblies of God, the Apostolic Faith Mission, the Roman Catholic Church, the Zion Christian Church, and the Indian Pentecostal Church of God alongside other Afro-Christian and charismatic Pentecostal assemblies. One of the oldest churches is the Mothowagae Church, established in 1903.

== Politics ==
The member of parliament for Moshupa is the Honorable Karabo Gare.
