= MELS Movement of Botswana =

Defunct Marxist political party in Botswana

- President: Themba Joina
- First Secretary: Mosalage Ditshoto
- Founded: 1984 (as a study movement) 1994 (as political party)
- Dissolved: 2013
- Merged into: Botswana Congress Party
- Headquarters: Gaborone
- Ideology: Communism; Marxism–Leninism; Stalinism; Maoism; Anti-revisionism; Pan-Africanism
- Political position: Far-left

The MELS Movement of Botswana was an anti-revisionist Marxist-Leninist communist party in Botswana without parliamentary representation. Themba Joina, a practicing lawyer, was the president of the organization. The name MELS is derived from (Karl) Marx, (Friedrich) Engels, (Vladimir) Lenin and (Joseph) Stalin.

== History ==
MELS emerged as a study group inspired by Mao Zedong and Pan-Africanism, founded at the Shashe Senior Secondary School in 1984. Its founding general secretary was Christopher Phatshwe. The basic political documents of the movement were drafted by Christopher Phatshswe and Thomson Proctor. Branches of the movement were formed at different educational institutions, such as the University of Botswana, Senior Secondary Schools and teacher training colleges. According to Joina, the group had contacts with the Black Consciousness Movement of Azania (BCM(A)) and the Pan-Africanist Congress of Azania (PAC) in neighbouring South Africa and MELS activists received political trainings from these groups. The MELS group constituting itself as a political party in 1994. Following Phatshwe's death, Mosalage Ditshoto became the new general secretary of the party. As of 2008, Mpho Mokano served as the youth secretary of the party.

The MELS Movement advocated for socialist policies, calling for support to unemployed and the setting up of Student Representative Councils across the country. They decried the Botswana Democratic Party's rule as 'neo-colonial'. Regarding regional issues, MELS Movement opposed the positions of Ian Khama's government towards the contemporary political situation in Zimbabwe (charging the Botswana government with having sided with the Movement for Democratic Change in Zimbabwean politics). At the 2011 annual delegates conference of the party in Molepolole, Joina condemned the NATO attack on Libya and called on the African Union to intervene.

At the time of the 1994 parliamentary election, MELS joined the United Democratic Front, a coalition of parties opposed to both the BDP and the BNF. No MELS nor any other UDF candidate was able to get elected. The party contested the 1999 general election, but merely received twenty-two votes (0.01% of the national vote). Prior to the election, Joina stated that the party only possessed one campaign vehicle and thus party activists had to move by foot to reach voters. Following the election the MELS Movement candidate in the Gaborone West constituency, Ndiye Tlhatlogang, charged the Independent Electoral Commission with irregularities.

At the 2009 general election, the party presented candidates in four parliamentary constituencies and two in local constituencies. None were elected. In total the party got 292 votes (0.05% of the national vote). The party contested the 2010 by-election in the Tonota North parliamentary constituency, fielding Mbayani Tshekedi Phalalo as its candidate.

The party merged into the centre-left Botswana Congress Party in 2013.

== See also ==
- List of anti-revisionist groups
