= Botswana Alliance Movement =

- Leader: Ephraim Setshwaelo
- Founded: 1999
- Dissolved: 14 May 2010
- Merged into: Botswana Congress Party
- Ideology: Progressivism
- Political position: Centre-left

The Botswana Alliance Movement (BAM) was a progressive political party in Botswana, led by Ephraim Lepetu Setshwaelo. Prior to the 2009 election the party entered into an electoral pact with the Botswana Congress Party. In the 2009 elections, the party won a seat in the National Assembly of Botswana for the first time.
