= Shoshong (Botswana constituency) =

Parliamentary constituency in the Central District of Botswana, 1965 onwards

- Single-member constituency for the National Assembly
- District: Central District
- Population: 30,764
- Major settlements: Shoshong
- Area: 7,868 km^{2}

Current constituency
- Created: 1965
- Party: UDC
- MP: Moneedi Bagaisamang
- Margin of victory: 5,112 (38.4 pp)

Shoshong is a constituency in the Central District represented in the National Assembly of Botswana by Moneedi Bagaisamang, a UDC MP since 2024.

== Constituency profile ==
Situated in the southeast of the Central District of Botswana, the Shoshong constituency was established in 1965 for the country's inaugural elections and is one of Botswana's longest extant constituencies.

Reflecting the dominant Ngwato population, the constituency was historically a Botswana Democratic Party (BDP) stronghold. From 1965 to 2014, the BDP consistently garnered an average of 80% of the vote. However, since the turn of the century, the BDP's dominance began to wane, with its vote share decreasing in each subsequent election.

In 2019, echoing a broader trend within the district, a significant political realignment occurred as Ian Khama, paramount chief of the Ngwato tribe fell out with the incumbent president, Mokgweetsi Masisi and leader of the BDP. This political discord impacted the constituency's voting patterns. The 2019 election saw a significant 22-point swing towards the opposition Umbrella for Democratic Change (UDC) from the BDP, marking their strongest national performance and the first time an opposition party won Shoshong. The UDC held the seat in 2024 with a larger majority.

The constituency, predominantly rural, encompasses the following villages:

1. Shoshong
2. Mmutlane
3. Kalamare
4. Bonwapitse
5. Mosolotshane
6. Ikongwe
7. Kodibeleng
8. Otse
9. Mokgenene
10. Poloka
11. Moralane
12. Dibete
13. Tobera

== Members of Parliament ==
Key: BDP UDC

Election	Winner
1965 election	Goareng Mosinyi
1969 election	Goareng Mosinyi
1974 election	Goareng Mosinyi
1979 election	Goareng Mosinyi
1984 election	Goareng Mosinyi
1989 election	Esther Mosinyi
1994 election	Modibedi Robi
1999 election	Gobopang Lefhoko
2004 election	Gobopang Lefhoko
2009 election	Dikgang Makgalemele
2014 election	Dikgang Makgalemele
2019 election	Aubrey Lesaso
2024 election	Moneedi Bagaisamang

== Election results ==
=== 2024 election ===
General election 2024: Shoshong
Party	Candidate	Votes	%	±%
UDC	Moneedi Bagaisamang	7,745	58.22	−6.80
BDP	Aubrey Lesaso	2,633	19.79	−9.82
BPF	Batsetswe Gontlafetse	2,260	16.99	N/A
BCP	Robert Molefabangwe	459	3.45	N/A
BRP	Lapelo Gaobusetswe	205	1.54	N/A
Margin of victory		5,112	38.43	+3.03
Total valid votes		13,302	98.34	−0.05
Rejected ballots		225	1.66	+0.05
Turnout		13,527	82.09	−0.54
Registered electors		16,479		
UDC hold		Swing	+1.51	

=== 2019 election ===
General election 2019: Shoshong
Party	Candidate	Votes	%	±%
UDC	Aubrey Lesaso	5,377	65.02	+22.69
BDP	Dikgang Makgalemele	3,843	29.61	−21.78
AP	Brine Mogametsi	697	5.37	N/A
Margin of victory		2,174	35.40	N/A
Total valid votes		12,977	98.39	+0.50
Rejected ballots		213	1.61	−0.50
Turnout		13,190	82.63	–3.34
Registered electors		15,962		
UDC gain from BDP		Swing	+22.24	

=== 2014 election ===
General election 2014: Shoshong
Party	Candidate	Votes	%	±%
BDP	Dikgang Makgalemele	5,377	51.39	−4.64
UDC	Aubrey Lesaso	4,429	42.33	+5.09
BCP	Pono Magowe	413	3.95	−2.78
Independent	Tibe Tibe	244	2.33	N/A
Margin of victory		948	9.06	–9.74
Total valid votes		10,463	97.89	+0.77
Rejected ballots		226	2.11	−0.77
Turnout		10,689	85.97	+9.21
Registered electors		12,434		
BDP hold		Swing	−0.23	

=== 2009 election ===
General election 2009: Shoshong
Party	Candidate	Votes	%	±%
BDP	Dikgang Makgalemele	4,820	56.03	−8.43
BNF	Aubrey Lesaso	3,203	37.24	+4.33
BCP	Senalebeng Mokgosi	579	6.73	−0.03
Margin of victory		1,617	18.80	−8.62
Total valid votes		8,602	97.12	−0.94
Rejected ballots		255	2.88	+0.94
Turnout		8,857	76.76	−4.74
Registered electors		11,538		
BDP hold		Swing	−2.05	

=== 2004 election ===
General election 2004: Shoshong
Party	Candidate	Votes	%	±%
BDP	Gobopang Lefhoko	3,391	64.46	−5.58
BNF	Patrick Malakaila	1,850	32.91	+6.92
BCP	Gontlefela Mokongwa	380	6.76	+2.79
Margin of victory		1,541	27.42	−16.63
Total valid votes		5,621	98.06	+3.30
Rejected ballots		362	1.94	−3.30
Turnout		5,983	81.50	+7.28
Registered electors		7,341		
BDP hold		Swing	+0.67	

=== 1999 election ===
General election 1999: Shoshong
Party	Candidate	Votes	%	±%
BDP	Gobopang Lefhoko	4,589	70.04	−3.36
BNF	D. T. Morotsi	1,703	25.99	−0.61
BCP	S. J. Mphoyakgosi	260	3.97	N/A
Margin of victory		2,886	44.05	−2.74
Total valid votes		6,552	94.76	N/A
Rejected ballots		362	5.24	N/A
Turnout		6,914	74.22	+1.81
Registered electors		9,315		
BDP hold		Swing	−1.38	

=== 1994 election ===
General election 1994: Shoshong
Party	Candidate	Votes	%	±%
BDP	Modibedi Robi	4,315	73.40	−12.40
BNF	Bailekae Ramahosi	1,564	26.60	+12.40
Margin of victory		2,751	46.79	−24.81
Turnout		5,879	72.41	+10.13
Registered electors		8,119		
BDP hold		Swing	–12.40	

=== 1989 election ===
General election 1989: Shoshong
Party	Candidate	Votes	%	±%
BDP	Esther Mosinyi	3,910	85.80	−11.16
BNF	Bailekae Ramahosi	647	14.20	+11.16
Margin of victory		3,263	71.60	−22.33
Turnout		4,557	62.28	−11.01
Registered electors		7,317		
BDP hold		Swing	–11.16	

=== 1984 election ===
General election 1984: Shoshong
Party	Candidate	Votes	%	±%
BDP	Goareng Mosinyi	4,630	96.96	+0.17
BNF	Bailekae Ramahosi	145	3.04	−0.17
Margin of victory		4,485	93.93	+0.36
Turnout		4,775	73.29	+3.97
Registered electors		6,515		
BDP hold		Swing	+0.17	

=== 1979 election ===
General election 1979: Shoshong
Party	Candidate	Votes	%	±%
BDP	Goareng Mosinyi	4,909	96.79	+2.17
BIP	M. M. Tlale	163	3.21	−2.17
Margin of victory		4,746	93.57	+4.33
Turnout		5,072	69.32	+32.42
Registered electors		7,317		
BDP hold		Swing	+2.17	

=== 1974 election ===
General election 1974: Shoshong
Party	Candidate	Votes	%	±%
BDP	Goareng Mosinyi	2,885	94.62	−1.25
BIP	M. M. Tlale	164	5.38	+1.25
Margin of victory		2,721	89.24	−2.51
Turnout		3,049	36.90	−26.97
Registered electors		8,262		
BDP hold		Swing	–1.25	

=== 1969 election ===
General election 1969: Shoshong
Party	Candidate	Votes	%	±%
BDP	Goareng Mosinyi	4,274	95.87	+1.39
BIP	M. M. Tlale	184	4.13	−0.39
Margin of victory		4,090	91.75	+0.79
Turnout		3,423	63.87	N/A
Registered electors		6,980		
BDP hold		Swing	+0.89	

=== 1965 election ===
General election 1965: Shoshong
Party	Candidate	Votes	%
BDP	Goareng Mosinyi	6,295	95.48
BIP	M.M. Tlale	298	4.52
Margin of victory		5,997	90.96
Turnout		6,593	N/A
Registered electors		N/A	
BDP win (new seat)			
