= Baháʼí Faith in Botswana =

The Baháʼí Faith in Botswana begins after ʻAbdu'l-Bahá, then leader of the Baháʼí Faith, wrote letters encouraging taking the religion to Africa in 1916. The first Baháʼí pioneers arrived in Botswana about October 1954, where they befriended many Africans. The first election of Botswana's Baháʼí National Spiritual Assembly was in 1970. The 2001 national census counts approximately 700 Baháʼís. However, the Association of Religion Data Archives estimated some 16,500 Baháʼís in Botswana as of 2010.

== Early Phase ==
=== ʻAbdu'l-Bahá's Tablets of the Divine Plan ===
ʻAbdu'l-Bahá wrote a series of letters, or tablets, to the followers of the religion in the United States in 1916–1917; these letters were compiled together in the book Tablets of the Divine Plan. The eighth and twelfth of the tablets mentioned Africa and were written on April 19, 1916 and February 15, 1917, respectively. Publication however was delayed in the United States until 1919—after the end of the First World War and the Spanish flu. The tablets were translated and presented by Mirza Ahmad Sohrab on April 4, 1919, and published in Star of the West magazine on December 12, 1919. ʻAbdu'l-Bahá mentions Baháʼís traveling "…especially from America to Europe, Africa, Asia and Australia, and travel through Japan and China. Likewise, from Germany teachers and believers may travel to the continents of America, Africa, Japan and China; in brief, they may travel through all the continents and islands of the globe" and " …the anthem of the oneness of the world of humanity may confer a new life upon all the children of men, and the tabernacle of universal peace be pitched on the apex of America; thus Europe and Africa may become vivified with the breaths of the Holy Spirit, this world may become another world, the body politic may attain to a new exhilaration…."

=== Establishment of the community ===
The religion arrived in the area during the end of the era of the Bechuanaland Protectorate, the predecessor colonial country, under the Union of South Africa. In 1953 Shoghi Effendi, head of the religion after the death of ʻAbdu'l-Bahá, planned an international teaching plan termed the Ten Year Crusade. During the plan pioneers moved to many countries including Botswana from places. This was during a period of wide scale growth in the religion across Sub-Saharan Africa near the end of the period of Colonisation of Africa. The goal of establishing a Baháʼí presence in Bechuanaland was assigned to the National Assembly of Iran then still in operation. However, by November 1953 recent arrivals the Johnsons from America then in South Africa saw the arrival of John and Audrey Robarts and son Patrick and daughter Nina from Canada who were assisted in reaching Mafeking (then in Bechuanaland) as Baháʼí pioneers where they arrived by October 1954 and were recognized as the first Baháʼís to the country earning the title Knight of Baháʼu'lláh from the then head of the Faith, Shoghi Effendi. By 1963 there were two assemblies; seven groups, and one isolated member. The Robarts had joined the religion in 1938 and when the first National Spiritual Assembly of Canada was formed in 1948, John was elected chairman, a post he held until 1953 when they moved. In 1954 Hand of the Cause, Musa Banani appointed John as an Auxiliary Board Member and the family went on Baháʼí pilgrimage. In 2005 Lally Warren recalled that as a young child in Mafikeng it had been unusual to meet white people who were pleasant to her so she believed that all white people were bad. That changed when she met the Robarts family. "The Robarts didn't treat me like a black child, they treated me as a child," she said. She recalled when she was 10 and the Robarts family came to her house for meetings with her parents, James and Stella Moncho, the first local couple to become Baháʼís, "They could only do this at night, and as they came towards the house they would switch their [car] lights on and off to say, 'Is it ok, is it safe, can we come?'…There was no electricity in the black area during those days so my mother would take a lantern and stick it out through the window and wave it to say, 'OK, it's safe for you to come.'"

The Robarts family befriended Modiri Molema, a highly respected medical doctor and the only black man who was permitted to associate with whites. Dr. Molema invited his friends and family to hear about the religion, and he gave the Robarts family letters of introduction to the Kgosi (traditional chiefs) of the Bechuanaland Protectorate. Dr. Molema converted to the religion but his enrollment was not made public because of likely harassment due to his previous high-profile political involvement. In 1955 his relative, Stanlake Kukama, became the first native Tswana of Bechuanaland to become a publicly declared Baháʼí. In 2005 Kukama recalled he had been an anti-apartheid activist, and was a member of the South African political party, the African National Congress and had detested white people because of their attitude towards Africans but that changed when he heard about the Baháʼí Faith from the Robarts family: "In 1955 I heard of the Baháʼí Faith and [found] the principles of the Faith were the solution to [achieve] peace and harmony for mankind.… I realized that the white and the black were all blind. They did not see the truth, they did not have the eye of the soul. Hence, I became a Baháʼí, and renounced man-made solutions to peace." The African National Congress tried to woo back Mr. Kukama for many years without success. The police kept him under surveillance even after he became a Baháʼí because they did not believe that he had given up partisan politics. Mr. Kukama later served for many years both as a member of the National Spiritual Assembly of the Baháʼís of Bophuthatswana and of South Africa.

In April 1956 the Baháʼí Faith was present in small numbers across 15 countries of southern Africa. To administer these communities a regional National Spiritual Assembly was elected in South West Africa to cover them. In 1956 John Robarts was elected to it.

By early 1957 the Baháʼí community numbered between 10 and 20 individuals and became part of the regional national assembly of South and West Africa. By 1963 there were two assemblies; seven groups, and one isolated member. The assemblies were in Lobatse, and Mahalapye and groups in Gaborone, Ghanzi, Kopong, Mafeking, Molepolole, Morwa, Serowe, and a lone Baháʼí in Moeng (which is near the Tswapong Hills).

== National development ==
Following the death of Shoghi Effendi, the elected Universal House of Justice was head of the religion and began to re-organized the Baháʼí communities of Africa, including Botswana, by splitting off national communities to form their own National Assemblies from 1964 though the 1990s. In 1967 the newly elected regional assembly of South Central Africa, then comprised the countries of Botswana, Malawi and Rhodesia. Its members were: Willard Mahtunge, Florence Fat'he-Aazam, Esther Moncho, Esther Glauder, Brian Eames, Enayat Sohaili, Leonard Chiposi, Helen A. Hope, and John D. Sargent Sr. There were ten delegates, sixty additional visitors for the fourth annual convention, held in Salisbury, Rhodesia.

In 1970 the first National Youth School in Botswana was attended by over thirty youth, adults and teachers. Following the classes the youth visited three villages previously arranged by the national assembly with the approval of the local chiefs where they presented a well received speech especially prepared for them. Because of the reception of the speech they were invited to a further six villages by the chiefs of those villages ultimately presenting the religion to almost 700 attendees of the presentations. Coverage of the tour was also done on local radio. Later the first Baháʼís from the Bushmen and the Kgalagadi had joined the religion.

The time came for the election of Botswana's Baháʼí National Spiritual Assembly elected in 1970. Its members in the 1971 re-election were: Stanley Matenge, Esther Moncho, Isaac Kgang, Dennis Makiwa, Maureen Gruber, Robert Sarracino, Bogatlu Pheto, Jeffrey Gruber, and Broer Oageng.

Baháʼí communities in Botswana unto 1973

In August 1971 the first public talks on the religion in Gaborone were undertaken and was broadcast over Radio Botswana on the topic of "African Traditional Beliefs and the Unity of the World Religions". A review of the community then noted that the national assembly and five local assemblies had incorporated and registered with the government. The national assembly then became legal owners of the national Baháʼí center. Sixty-seven localities had been introduced to the religion and translations of some Baháʼí scripture had been accomplished. Some forty chiefs at various levels had been sent messages by the national assembly about the religion. Fifty-seven villages had been visited with mass meetings resulting. There were only four pioneers present then. The village of Boneapitse was noted as being a majority of Baháʼís.

An all-Bushman local assembly was first elected in Tshasane in 1972. When it was re-elected in 1973 its members were: Ci-!Gau, !'ea, Titi, Diolo, Kaka, Mashipa, N!!g''ae-!Nobo, Baberi, Mpalo.

The Kalahari Desert (shown in maroon) & Kalahari Basin (orange)

The first national summer school happened Dec 29 to Jan 4 1979-1980 and was followed by a regional conference on the promulgation on the religion with participation of Lobatse, Jwaneng, and Kanye in addition to members of the national assembly and auxiliary board members in February. In August 1981 Botswana's first international conference was attended by 150 adults and children from seven countries.

In 1984 the Baháʼís of Gaborone held a few public meetings - one highlighted UN Day at which several city officials attended, another was with visiting Counsellor Hooper Dunbar which was also covered by television and radio news. In 1985 the Baháʼís were invited to a seminar on religions at the University of Batswana. More than 100 youth met for an international youth conference in August that was opened by the then vice-president of Botswana - Peter Mmusi. That year was also the one when the Universal House of Justice's The Promise of World Peace was delivered to Botswana's then president, Quett Masire as well as translated in Tswana as part of the overall observance of the UN's International Year of Peace. A survey of international standings of the religion in 1987 found that while Botswana had national and local assemblies recognized legally the Baháʼí Holy Days, marriages and tax exemption as a religion were not recognized.

=== Visits of Hands of the Cause ===
Hands of the Cause are a select group of Baháʼís, appointed for life, whose main function was to propagate and protect the religion. In May 1971 Hand of the Cause Adelbert Mühlschlegel was the first to tour Botswana.

In November 1971 Hand of the Cause Enoch Olinga toured the country and visited three of the then newest and most active Baháʼí communities in Botswana - Ratholo and Bonwapitse (both in the Tswapong Hills area), and Palla Road (a.k.a. Dinokwe) He reviewed understanding the religion in a non-literalist way, elaborated on the principals of the religion like of unity of humanity, progressive revelation, and that the religion was present in many countries beyond their lands despite the fact that school books did not mention the religion. Later he gave a public talk entitled "The Baháʼí Faith and the Social Order" and a radio interview in Gaborone where he addressed wide-ranging topics from the definition of the word "Baháʼí", the history of the religion, its relationship with Christianity and the difficulties with social norms in South Africa.

In June 1972 Hand of the Cause Ruhiyyih Khanum toured the country for some 20 days. She was met an hour's walk from the village of Selebi-Phikwe by a new mother with a week-old baby. At a few villages including Seleka she met with local school teachers. She congratulated the pioneers that were well out in the countryside rather than clustered in the capital. At another village she spoke at a teachers' training college noting the Baháʼí teaching of equality of the sexes and the importance of mothers and teachers, eliminating illiteracy but that matters of faith are not dependent on book learning. In Bonwapitse she addressed the importance of prayer, the meaning of "Alláh'u'Abhá". In Mmutlane she addressed the topic of dreams related about Baháʼu'lláh and the Báb. She went on to other villages and illustrated diverse responses to faith. In the Kalahari Desert she met with Bushmen when only a few had joined the religion so far hoping the religion would help preserve their qualities of gentleness and goodness. Then she met with the national assembly especially about the topic of the Baháʼí view of "consultation", that the Baháʼí funds are to be spent on specific purposes for the promulgation of the religion. At Lobatse she spoke at another teachers' training college on the importance of youth. The final village was Good Hope where she met the first Baháʼís of Botswana -Mr. and Mrs. Moncho.

In March 1978 Hand of the Cause H. Collis Featherstone toured Botswana for a week speaking of the Baháʼí views on themes of the religion and presented an address on radio. In April John Robarts, who was appointed a Hand of the Cause in 1957, and his wife Audrey returned to Botswana. They visited several villages and old friends and were interviewed in the Botswana Daily News and Radio Botswana.

=== Individual stories ===
Paula Rath lived in Botswana in 1972–73 with her former husband, Dick Graham as Baha'i pioneers and ran a little newspaper called Puisano. Maureen Page was the secretary of the National Spiritual Assembly of the Baha'is of Botswana for many years and her husband Jeff Gruber was a linguist, studying a particular Bushman language. Jeff worked on creating a written alphabet for a Bushman language that had never been categorized and alphabetized before working with a Kalahari Bushman who spoke Tswana fluently. Translations were undertaken and in 1973 a book of Baháʼí prayers (published as "Dithapelo tsa Baháʼí tse di Senotsweng ke Baháʼu'lláh, Bab le ʻAbdu'l-Baha,") was done.

An Iranian refugee since 1979, Yousef Mostaghim, and his family continued to support Baháʼí activities when they moved for a few months to Gaborone, Botswana, circa 1982 before settling in the United States.

Dwight W. Allen served as a Staff Development Advisor for the Molepolole College of Education and Ministry of Education, Botswana, while as Research Associate with the Florida State University for 1986–88.

Ash Hartwell was an early Peace Corps volunteer in various posts in Africa and then moved back to the United States. He became a student of Dwight W. Allen on reforming university educational programs, learned and joined the Baháʼí Faith, and then returned to Africa. Eventually his family moved to Botswana. While there he had a chance to interact with the Bushmen of the Kalahari during Baháʼí oriented trips and worked managing a program on secondary education teacher training for almost five years before moving on to Egypt.

Lally Warren was a member of the Continental Board of Counsellors in Africa from 1985 to 2000 and has served the religion in many other capacities.

=== Sustained women's groups ===
In 1975 a pair of women from Rhodesia traveled a few places in the country holding extended classes on the religion in a few locations advancing the activity of women. The pair were joined by a few local youth. Indeed, in 1976 five handicraft clubs for Baháʼí women were functioning with the assistance of Iran Sohaili from Rhodesia. There was a continued meeting in 1978 when a small group of Baháʼís visited them for a week and encouraged them to adopt an extension goal of a nearby village.

== Modern community ==
Since its inception the religion has had involvement in socio-economic development beginning by giving greater freedom to women, promulgating the promotion of female education as a priority concern, and that involvement was given practical expression by creating schools, agricultural coops, and clinics. The religion entered a new phase of activity when a message of the Universal House of Justice dated 20 October 1983 was released. Baháʼís were urged to seek out ways, compatible with the Baháʼí teachings, in which they could become involved in the social and economic development of the communities in which they lived. Worldwide in 1979 there were 129 officially recognized Baháʼí socio-economic development projects. By 1987, the number of officially recognized development projects had increased to 1482.

=== Youth projects ===
The first all-youth teaching project which took place in Botswana, and the first group teaching expedition undertaken for the Faith in that country, took place in August, 1970. A group of some 10-15 Baha'i youth, including among them White Dikhang, Patrick Masimolole, Godfrey Morewang, "Twist" Nsibisibi, Robert Petersen and Robert Sarracino, traveled from Gaborone south to the area around Lobatse, west to Kanye, north to Molepolole, and back to Gaborone, proclaiming and teaching the Faith in about a dozen villages. In each village visited they approached the village chief or headman and asked to address those gathered at the morning kgotla, a daily court which the chief would hold in the village. In all cases this group of youth was well received, and often the initial presentation was followed by an animated session of questions and discussion.

Among the earliest development projects in Botswana was a systematic initiation of a major "Youth Year of Service" project which coordinated volunteer activities with assemblies with a defined need. This was extended by an orientation program of youth in diverse traditional African cultures. Meanwhile, recognition of the work of the national government in support of human rights was presented by the national assembly - at the reception ambassadors and diplomatic core from several countries and the UN. The UN representative invited the Baha'is in turn to co-sponso the 1988 UN Day observance. An international youth conference was held in 1989 at which 120 people from 13 countries attended. In December youth from Transkei were among the choirs that performed at a Baháʼí International Music Festival in Botswana.

During 1994–95, youth camps were particularly popular in Botswana where the community held the country's first youth camp. For one week, youth gathered at the Baháʼí Institute in Mahalapye and studied the life of Baháʼu'lláh, the Kitab-i-Aqdas, and such teachings of the religion as chastity and marriage, and the immortality of the soul.

"Who is Writing the Future? A Seminar on the Issues of the 21st Century" in 2000 held on the campus of the University of Botswana.

=== Broader efforts ===
In 2001 then President of Botswana Festus Mogae praised publication of Baháʼí books in native Setswana language. One was a book of Baháʼí prayers in its third reprint with a revised translation and the other was The Hidden Words of Baháʼu'lláh (published as "Mafoko a a Subilweng a ga Baháʼu'lláh".) The book of prayers is available online for free.

The minister of local government of Botswana, Margaret Nasha, commended the activities of the community when she addressed its golden jubilee held December 2004.

Baháʼís from Botswana were among the thousand who gathered for a regional conference called for by the Universal House of Justice to be held in Johannesburg, South Africa, in November 2008.

=== Individuals ===
Robert Sylvester grew up Catholic in the United States but converted to the religion in the 1970s. He and his wife moved to Zambia in the later 1970s, where he worked in a school and served in the Baháʼí community there. Then they moved to Botswana. He would serve as Principal (Chief Executive Officer) of Westwood International School in Gaborone, Botswana from 1990 to 2000. During the same period he also served in some institutions of the religion-appointed to the Permanent Baháʼí Training Institute in Botswana on its board of directors (1996-2000) and as external affairs officer for the National Spiritual Assembly of the Baháʼís of Botswana (1999-2000) and then moved back to the United States.

Shahin Lockman and her husband served a number of medical posts including in Botswana. Lockman worked on tuberculosis in Botswana. On her first visit there in 1996, another disease caught her attention: HIV/AIDS. Both eventually worked in the first clinical trial of the Botswana-Harvard AIDS Institute partnership in 2000.

Sean Hinton, a member of the Aspen Institute's Leaders Action Forum, served as the supporter and catalyst for an HIV/AIDS awareness project called Letsema la Itlotlo (conceived by his parents-in-law Gerald and Lally Warren) to promote change in the behaviors that lead to the spread of HIV/AIDS in Botswana by using traditional cultural teachings and the values associated with religious belief as forces of attitudinal change. Two founding grants were received from De Beers Botswana and from the Office of Social and Economic Development of the Baháʼí International Community.

In 2009 Lucretia Warren, chairperson of the National Spiritual Assembly of the Baháʼís of Botswana and a former member of the Baháʼí Continental Board of Counsellors for Africa, presented at her third Parliament of the World's Religions held in Melbourne Australia as a member of a panel discussion on "Interfaith and the future of Africa".

=== Demographics ===
The Association of Religion Data Archives (relying mostly on the World Christian Encyclopedia) estimated some 16,500 Baháʼís in 2010. However the 2001 national census counts approximately 700 Baháʼís. Members of each community estimate that these figures significantly understated their respective numbers.

== See also ==
- Religion in Botswana
- History of Botswana
