= Francistown West =

Parliamentary constituency in the North-East District, 1994 onwards

- Single-member constituency for the National Assembly
- District: North-East
- Population: 34,684
- Major settlements: Francistown
- Area: 132 km^{2}

Current constituency
- Created: 1994
- Party: UDC
- Created from: Francistown
- MP: Mokwaledi Moswaane
- Margin of victory: 3,793 (35.6 pp)

Francistown West is a constituency in the North-East District represented in the National Assembly of Botswana by Mokwaledi Moswaane of the Umbrella for Democratic Change since 2019.

== Constituency profile ==
The constituency was originally created in 1994, as part of an increase in the population of Francistown constituencies. The Botswana Democratic Party (BDP) has held the seat since 1999 and lost it 25 years later at the 2024 general election amongst a nationwide swing against the BDP which saw it lose power for the first time. The BDP was relegated to third place in 2024 and saw a 38-point swing against it, the third worst performance of the BDP in that election, behind Mahalapye West and neighbouring Francistown South.

The urban constituency encompasses the following locations:

1. Western Francistown

== Members of Parliament ==
Key: BNF BDP UDC

Election	Winner
1994 election	Vain Mamela
1999 election	Tshelang Masisi
2004 election	Tshelang Masisi
2009 election	Tshelang Masisi
2014 election	Mokwaledi Moswaane
2019 election	Mokwaledi Moswaane
2024 election	Mokwaledi Moswaane

== Election results ==
=== 2024 election ===
General election 2024: Francistown West
Party	Candidate	Votes	%	±%
UDC	Mokwaledi Moswaane	6,223	58.46	+24.61
BCP	Nthusi Chimbise	2,430	22.83	N/A
BDP	Samuel Kealotswe	1,605	15.08	−38.20
BPF	Hendrick Nfundisi	386	3.63	−0.38
Margin of victory		3,793	35.63	N/A
Total valid votes		10,644	99.61	+0.09
Rejected ballots		42	0.39	−0.09
Turnout		10,686	77.91	+1.38
Registered electors		13,715		
UDC gain from BDP		Swing	+23.72	

=== 2019 election ===
General election 2019: Francistown West
Party	Candidate	Votes	%	±%
BDP	Mokwaledi Moswaane	4,928	53.28	−0.45
UDC	Mbaakanyi Lenyatso	3,148	34.03	−10.65
AP	Moalosi Dira	763	8.25	N/A
BPF	Nthusi Chimbise	371	4.01	N/A
Independent	Goitsemodimo Setume	40	0.43	N/A
Margin of victory		1,780	19.25	+0.58
Total valid votes		9,250	99.52	−0.02
Rejected ballots		45	0.48	+0.02
Turnout		9,295	76.53	−2.54
Registered electors		12,145		
BDP hold		Swing	+5.10	

Note: UDC vote share is compared to the total vote share of the UDC and BCP in 2014.

=== 2014 election ===
General election 2014: Francistown West
Party	Candidate	Votes	%	±%
BDP	Mokwaledi Moswaane	5,305	53.73	+3.63
BCP	Habaudi Hubona	3,461	35.06	+1.82
UDC	Shathiso Tambula	950	9.62	N/A
Independent	Joseph Mabutho	157	1.59	N/A
Margin of victory		1,844	18.67	+1.81
Total valid votes		9,873	99.54	+0.73
Rejected ballots		46	0.46	−0.73
Turnout		9,873	79.07	+8.09
Registered electors		12,486		
BDP hold		Swing	+2.73	

=== 2009 election ===
General election 2009: Francistown West
Party	Candidate	Votes	%	±%
BDP	Tshelang Masisi	4,188	50.10	−3.54
BCP	Michael Modise	2,779	33.24	+9.83
BPP	Whyte B. Marobela	1,059	12.67	−10.28
Margin of victory		1,409	16.86	−13.37
Total valid votes		8,360	98.81	+0.50
Rejected ballots		101	1.19	−0.50
Turnout		8,461	70.98	+0.37
Registered electors		11,920		
BDP hold		Swing	−3.15	

=== 2004 election ===
General election 2004: Francistown West
Party	Candidate	Votes	%	±%
BDP	Tshelang Masisi	3,526	53.64	+5.73
BCP	Whyte B. Marobela	1,539	23.41	+4.06
BPP	Bernard M. Balikani	1,509	22.95	N/A
Margin of victory		1,987	30.23	+1.67
Total valid votes		6,574	98.31	+1.11
Rejected ballots		113	1.74	−1.11
Turnout		6,687	70.61	−4.88
Registered electors		9,471		
BDP hold		Swing	+4.90	

=== 1999 election ===
General election 1999: Francistown West
Party	Candidate	Votes	%	±%
BDP	Tshelang Masisi	4,018	47.91	+14.36
BCP	Vain Mamela	1,623	19.35	N/A
BNF	V.S. Kenosi	1,604	19.12	−20.41
BAM	M. Modise	1,142	13.62	N/A
Margin of victory		2,395	28.56	N/A
Total valid votes		8,387	97.20	N/A
Rejected ballots		242	2.80	N/A
Turnout		8,629	75.49	−0.36
Registered electors		11,430		
BDP gain from BNF		Swing	+16.86	

=== 1994 election ===
General election 1994: Francistown West
Party	Candidate	Votes	%
BNF	Vain Mamela	2,776	39.53
BDP	John Seakgosing	2,356	33.55
BPP	M.M. Modise	1,891	26.92
Margin of victory		420	5.98
Turnout		7,022	75.85
Registered electors		9,258	
BNF win (new seat)			
