= Shoshong =

- Town
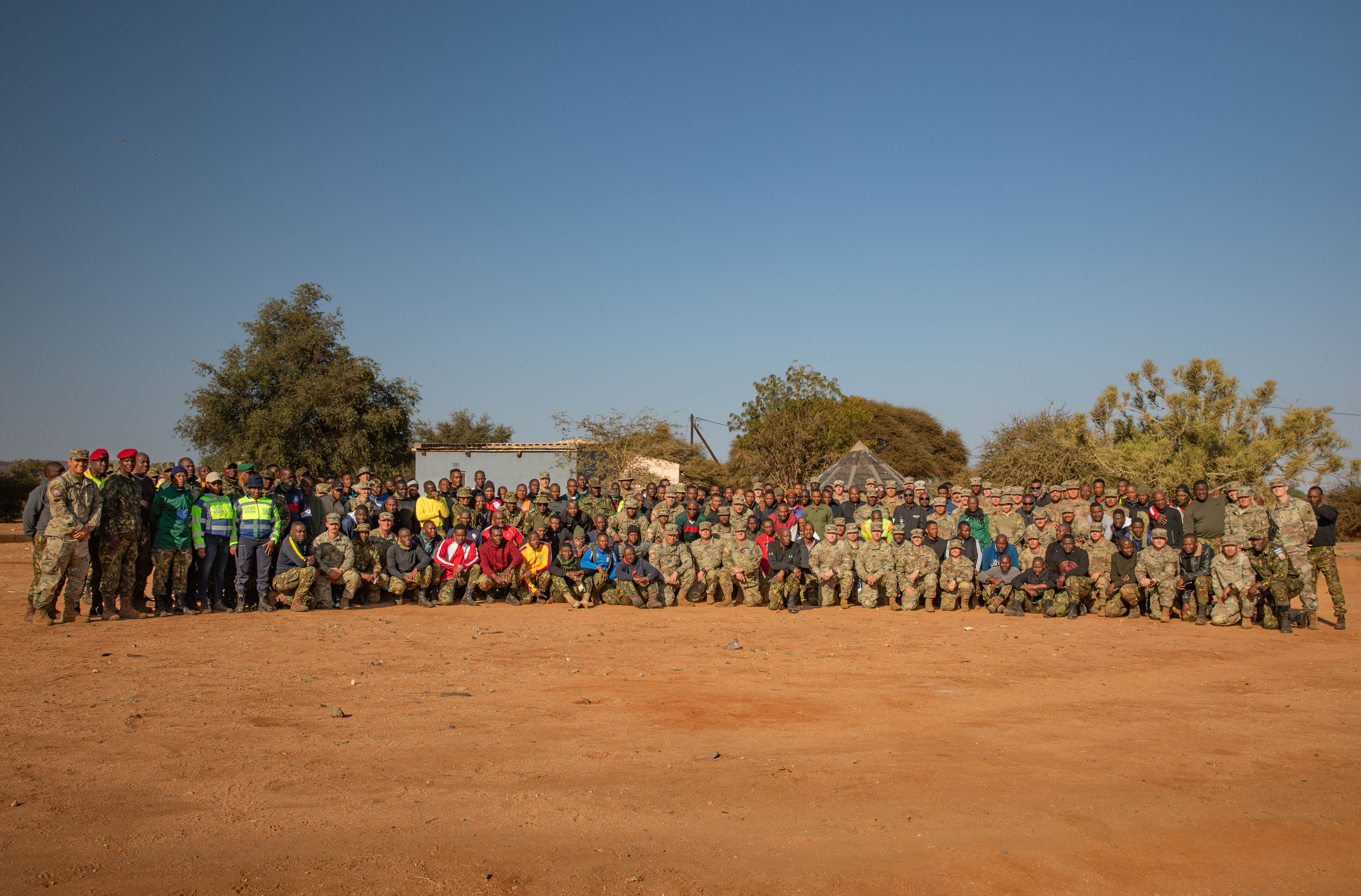
- Litter clean up in Shoshong

- Location within Botswana
- Coordinates: 23°02′08″S 26°30′07″E
- Country: Botswana
- District: Central District
- Elevation: 1,081 m (3,546 ft)

Population (2022)
  - Total: 8,887
- Time zone: UTC+02:00 (CAT)
- ISO 3166 code: BW-CE
- Climate: BSh

Shoshong is a town in Botswana, formerly the chief settlement of the eastern Bamangwato.

== Physical location ==
Shoshong is located just north of the Tropic of Capricorn at 23°02′S 26°31′E, in the Central District of Botswana, about 40 km (25 mi) west of Mahalapye. The town is situated 3,000 ft (910 m) above sea level in the valley of the Shoshong, an intermittent tributary of the Limpopo. Nearby villages are Tobela, Ikongwe, Kalamare, Mmutlane, and Mosolotshane.

Shoshong is encircled by hills used for grazing cattle, and is a windy place. The central kgotla is located by the mouth of the steep valley (kloof) which used to be the source of water for the village.

== History ==
Shoshong was initially inhabited by BaPhaleng, who were later joined by Bakaa, and later BaNgwato under King Sekgoma I. Oral traditions from the village points that the Baphaleng chief invited Bangwato from Mosu where they were continuously harassed and vulnerable to Matebele attacks. The site of Shoshong was chosen as being easily defensible against the Matabele.

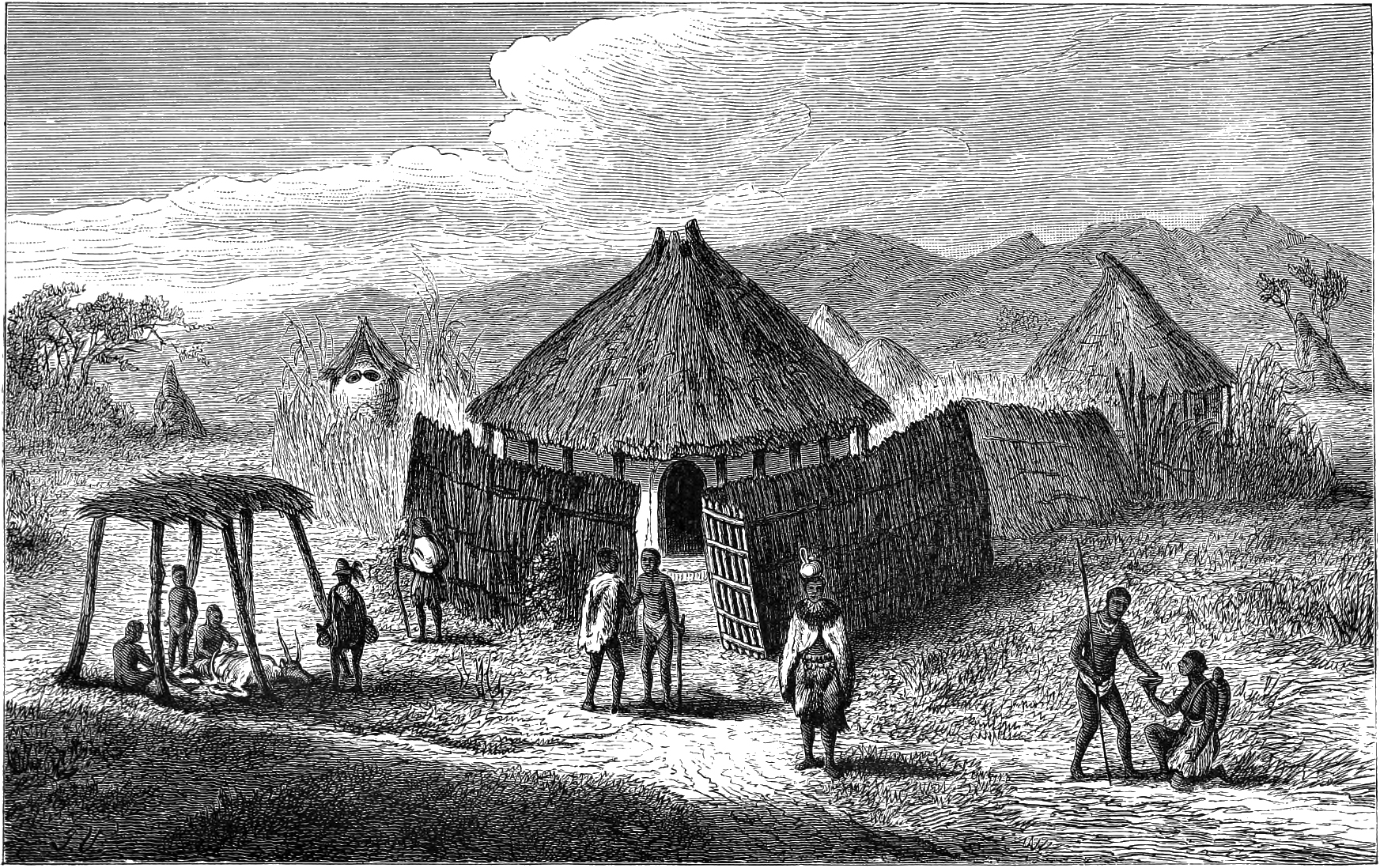
Bamangwato huts at Shoshong, 1881

Being the meeting place of trade routes from south and north it was of considerable importance to early explorers (including David Livingstone) and traders in South-Central Africa.

A mission station of the London Missionary Society (preceded for many years by a station of the Hermannsburg Lutheran Missionary Society) was founded here in 1862. Scottish missionary John Mackenzie (1835–99), who lived at Shoshong from 1862 to 1876, "believed that the Ngwato and other African peoples with whom he worked were threatened by Boer freebooters encroaching on their territory from the south", and campaigned "for the establishment of what became the Bechuanaland Protectorate, to be ruled directly from Britain."

In 1875, King Sekgoma was overthrown here by his Christian son Khama (later Khama III or Khama the Great). In 1885 (at the time of the declaration of the British protectorate of Bechuanaland) Shoshong had 20,000 to 30,000 inhabitants, including about twenty Europeans.

=== The move to Palapye ===
By the 1880s, Shoshong had existed in the same location for forty years, possibly a record for a Tswana town. But it became a 'Desert City', almost waterless with 'one trickling well' and with 'indescribable filth'. Due to the water shortage in 1888/1889, Khama and most of his followers moved to Phalatswe/Old Palapye, 95 km (60 miles) N.E. of Shoshong, and later to Serowe to the north-west of Palapye. Like Shoshong, these places were built in valleys of tributaries of the Limpopo. To make up for the loss of the defensible location, Khama had made an alliance with the British who were preparing a forward movement to take over Mashonaland and Matabeleland.

However, by 1898, Phalatswe was also running short of water, and Khama ordered some of his people back to Shoshong. The BaPhaleng returned in 1900 and the Bakaa in 1902, while the capital relocated to Serowe. At the publication of the 1911 Encyclopædia Britannica, Shoshong had a population of about 800.

=== Modern Shoshong ===
In the 2001 census, the population of "Shoshong and Associated Localities" was listed as 11,176 people, including 7,490 in "Village Shoshong". According to Botswana 2022 Population and Housing Census, Preliminary results volume 2, Shoshong has registered a population growth decline of 0.9%. The village has a boarding school, therefore the decline could be attributed to the fact that students were enumerated at their usual place of residence even when they were not present during enumeration. Currently, Shoshong has 8,827 population compared to 9,678 of 2011.

In 2012, Kgosi Sediegeng Kgamane's decision to install his son as chief created controversy. Kgamane is described as "a prominent Mongwato royal and uncle to president Ian Khama".

Historically Shoshong's chieftainship had been held by three tribes from three different wards of the Bakaa, BaPhaleng and Bagwato simultaneously sitting at the Kgotla to deliberate the issues of the people.
