= Otse (disambiguation) =

Otse is a village in the South-East District, Botswana

Otse may also refer to:

- Otse, Central District, village in Central District, Botswana
- Otse Hill, Botswana
- OTse TV, Ukrainian TV channel, see ICTV (Ukraine)
