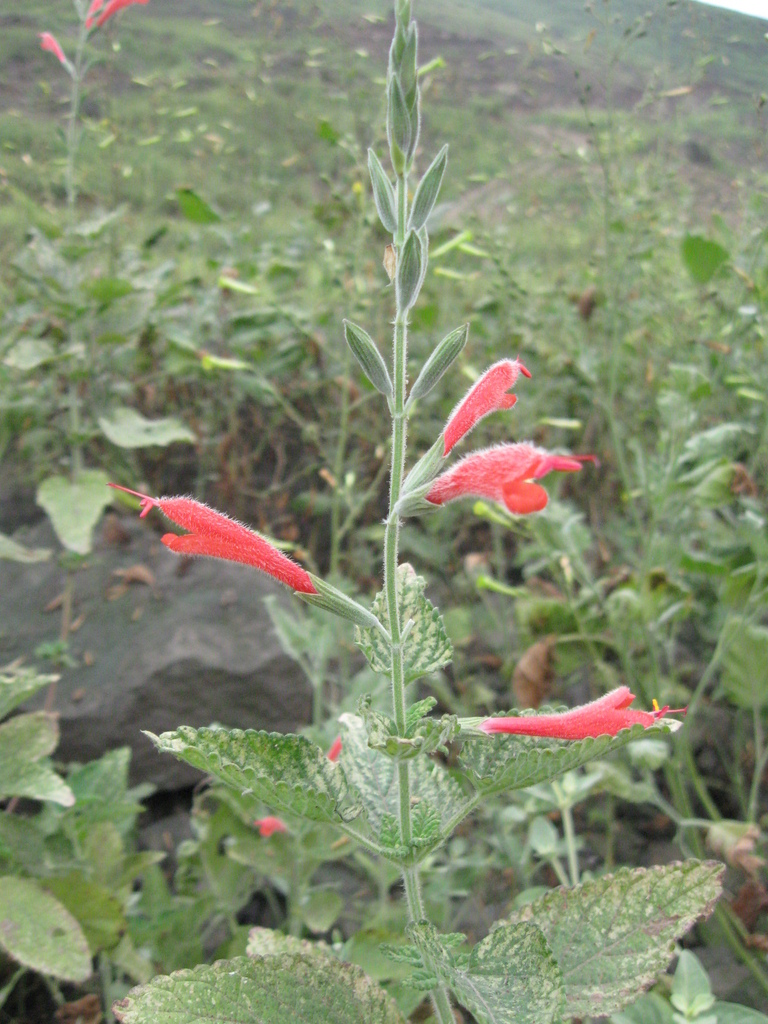

Scientific classification
- Kingdom: Plantae
- Clade: Tracheophytes
- Clade: Angiosperms
- Clade: Eudicots
- Clade: Asterids
- Order: Lamiales
- Family: Lamiaceae
- Genus: Salvia
- Species: S. tubiflora

Binomial name
- Salvia tubiflora Sm.

= Salvia tubiflora =

Species of plant

Salvia tubiflora is a perennial native to a small area of western Peru and northern Chile near the tropic of Capricorn, growing at elevations from 800 feet (240 m) to 1,600 feet (490 m).

Salvia tubiflora grows up to 9 feet (2.7 m) tall and 3 feet (0.91 m) wide, with heart shaped yellow-green leaves that reach 4 inches (10 cm) long and 2 inches (5.1 cm) wide. The undersides have prominent veins with tiny hairs arranged in rows. The sparse flowers are a dark cranberry-red color, growing two or three in a whorl, on stiff inflorescences that reach 12 inches (30 cm) long. The 1 inch (2.5 cm) flowers are long, straight and tube shaped, which explains the specific epithet tubiflora. The 0.75 inches (1.9 cm) calyx is an unusual reddish green color and covered with small hairs and glands.
