= Mahalapye West =

Parliamentary constituency in the Central District, 2004 onwards

- Single-member constituency for the National Assembly
- District: Central
- Population: 37,066
- Major settlements: Mahalapye
- Area: 551 km^{2}

Current constituency
- Created: 2004
- Party: UDC
- Created from: Mahalapye
- MP: David Tshere
- Margin of victory: 7,957 (58.4 pp)

Mahalapye West is a constituency in the Central District represented in the National Assembly of Botswana by David Tshere of the Umbrella for Democratic Change (UDC) since 2019.

== Constituency profile ==
The constituency was created in 2004 as part of an increase in the number of Mahalapye constituencies from one to two. The Botswana Democratic Party (BDP) won the seat in its inaugural election in 2004 and held on to it for the next two elections. In 2019, echoing a broader trend within the district, a significant political realignment occurred as Ian Khama, paramount chief of the Ngwato tribe fell out with the incumbent president, Mokgweetsi Masisi and leader of the BDP. This political discord impacted the constituency's voting patterns. The Umbrella for Democratic Change flipped the seat, benefitting from the BPF siphoning away votes as well as the UDC gaining votes from the BDP.

In the context of the 2024 general election, which resulted in the BDP losing national power for the first time since independence in 1966, the party's vote share in the constituency declined to 14.8%, representing its second-lowest performance in any constituency in history, marginally ahead of its result in Francistown South. The UDC, by contrast, recorded a substantial increase of 21 percentage points in its vote share compared to the 2019 election. Thus, David Tshere was re-elected with 73% of the vote and a margin of 58 percentage points — the highest vote share and margin of victory attained by a non-BDP candidate in Botswana's electoral history, surpassing the previous record of 71% set by Bathoen II 55 years prior. Thus the seat is considered a safe seat for the UDC.

The primarily urban constituency encompasses the following locations:

1. Mahalapye
2. Tewane

== Members of Parliament ==
Key: BDP UDC

| Election | Winner |
|---|---|
| 2004 election | Mompati Merafhe |
| 2009 election | Mompati Merafhe |
| 2014 election | Joseph Molefe |
| 2019 election | David Tshere |
| 2024 election | David Tshere |

== Election results ==
=== 2024 election ===
General election 2024: Mahalapye West
| Party | Candidate | Votes | % | ±% |
|---|---|---|---|---|
| UDC | David Tshere | 9,969 | 73.20 | +21.36 |
| BDP | Mompati Ntapu | 2,012 | 14.77 | −19.05 |
| BCP | Moncho Moncho | 818 | 6.00 | N/A |
| BPF | Agobakwe Magapa | 716 | 5.26 | −6.89 |
| BRP | Reginald Kadiwa | 103 | 0.76 | N/A |
| Margin of victory | | 7,957 | 58.43 | +40.41 |
| Total valid votes | | 13,618 | 97.64 | −0.09 |
| Rejected ballots | | 329 | 2.36 | +0.09 |
| Turnout | | 13,947 | 84.53 | −0.45 |
| Registered electors | | 16,500 | | |
| UDC hold | | Swing | +20.21 | |

=== 2019 election ===
General election 2019: Mahalapye West
| Party | Candidate | Votes | % | ±% |
|---|---|---|---|---|
| UDC | David Tshere | 6,016 | 51.84 | +9.58 |
| BDP | Bolele Bolele | 3,925 | 33.82 | −22.81 |
| BPF | Agobakwe Magapa | 1,410 | 12.15 | N/A |
| AP | Tsholofelo Sebele | 253 | 2.18 | N/A |
| Margin of victory | | 2,091 | 18.02 | N/A |
| Total valid votes | | 11,604 | 97.73 | −0.86 |
| Rejected ballots | | 270 | 1.32 | +0.86 |
| Turnout | | 11,874 | 84.98 | +1.48 |
| Registered electors | | 13,972 | | |
| UDC gain from BDP | | Swing | +16.20 | |

Note: UDC vote share is compared to the total vote share of the UDC and BCP in 2014.

=== 2014 election ===
General election 2014: Mahalapye West
| Party | Candidate | Votes | % | ±% |
|---|---|---|---|---|
| BDP | Joseph Molefe | 6,542 | 56.63 | −15.24 |
| BCP | David Tshere | 3,436 | 29.74 | +11.10 |
| UDC | Mmika Solomon | 1,446 | 12.52 | +3.03 |
| Independent | Bonang Mmopi | 128 | 1.11 | N/A |
| Margin of victory | | 3,106 | 26.89 | −26.34 |
| Total valid votes | | 11,552 | 98.59 | +0.50 |
| Rejected ballots | | 165 | 1.41 | −0.50 |
| Turnout | | 11,717 | 83.50 | +9.93 |
| Registered electors | | 14,033 | | |
| BDP hold | | Swing | −13.17 | |

Note: UDC vote share is compared to the vote share of the BNF in 2009.

=== 2009 election ===
General election 2009: Mahalapye West
| Party | Candidate | Votes | % | ±% |
|---|---|---|---|---|
| BDP | Mompati Merafhe | 6,686 | 71.87 | +4.58 |
| BCP | Moncho Moncho | 1,734 | 18.64 | +6.56 |
| BNF | Morake Phiri | 883 | 9.49 | −11.13 |
| Margin of victory | | 4,952 | 53.23 | +6.56 |
| Total valid votes | | 9,303 | 98.09 | −0.38 |
| Rejected ballots | | 181 | 1.91 | +0.38 |
| Turnout | | 9,484 | 73.57 | −3.48 |
| Registered electors | | 12,892 | | |
| BDP hold | | Swing | +5.57 | |

=== 2004 election ===
General election 2004: Mahalapye West
| Party | Candidate | Votes | % |
|---|---|---|---|
| BDP | Mompati Merafhe | 5,429 | 67.29 |
| BNF | Abigail Mogalakwe | 1,664 | 20.62 |
| BCP | Thomas Ookeditse | 975 | 12.08 |
| Margin of victory | | 3,765 | 46.67 |
| Total valid votes | | 8,068 | 98.47 |
| Rejected ballots | | 125 | 1.53 |
| Turnout | | 8,193 | 77.05 |
| Registered electors | | 10,633 | |
| BDP win (new seat) | | | |
