= Tewane =

Coordinates: 22°51′7″S 26°54′11″E

Location of Tewane

Tewane is a village in Central District of Botswana. Tewane is located 40 km north of Mahalapye, and it has a primary school. The population was 126 in 2001 census.
