= Aubrey Lesaso =

Motswana politician

Deputy Minister of Education and Skills Development of Botswana
- In office 13 February 2022 – 1 November 2024
- President: Mokgweetsi Masisi
- Succeeded by: Justin Hunyepa

Member of Parliament for Shoshong
- In office 5 November 2019 – 5 September 2024
- Preceded by: Dikgang Makgalemele
- Succeeded by: Moneedi Bagaisamang

Personal details
- Born: Botswana
- Party: Botswana Democratic Party

Aubrey Lesaso is a Motswana politician. He was the Deputy Minister of Education and Skills Development in Botswana, having been appointed to the position in 2019 by Mokgweetsi Masisi until November 2024. His term began on 13 February 2022.

Awards and achievements
| Preceded by | Deputy Minister of Education and Skills Development of Botswana | Succeeded by |
