= Mosolotshane =

Coordinates: 22°56′19″S 26°22′43″E

Location of Mosolotshane

Mosolotshane is a village in Central District of Botswana. It is located 50 km west of Mahalapye and 20 km north-west of Shoshong. Mosolotshane has a primary school and a health clinic, and the population was 2375 in 2022 census. 1113 males and 1262 females https://www.statsbots.org.bw/sites/default/files/publications/Population%20of%20Cities%20Towns%20and%20Villages%20%202022.pdf
