= Francistown South =

Parliamentary constituency in the North-East District, 2004 onwards

- Single-member constituency for the National Assembly
- District: North-East
- Population: 35,262
- Major settlements: Francistown
- Area: 21 km^{2}

Current constituency
- Created: 2004
- Party: UDC
- Created from: Francistown West; Francistown East
- MP: Wynter Mmolotsi
- Margin of victory: 5,109 (53.2 pp)

Francistown South is a constituency in the North-East District represented in the National Assembly of Botswana by Wynter Mmolotsi of the Umbrella for Democratic Change (UDC) since 2009.

== Constituency profile ==
The constituency was created in 2004 as part of an increase in the number of Francistown constituencies from two to three. Wynter Mmolotsi of the UDC has represented the constituency since 2009 under three different political parties: the Botswana Democratic Party (BDP) in 2009, the UDC in 2014, the Alliance for Progressives (AP) in 2019 (the only seat won by the AP that election) and the UDC again in 2024. Following the 2024 general election, which saw the BDP lose power for the first time in history, Mmolotsi became the longest-serving MP, having served since the 10th Parliament. Notably, in the 2024 election, the BDP recorded its lowest-ever result in a constituency, securing only 14.5%. As of the 2024 general election, this constituency is the UDC’s second safest, behind Mahalapye West.

The urban constituency encompasses the following locations:

1. Southern Francistown

== Members of Parliament ==
Key: BDP UDC AP UDC

| Election | Winner |
|---|---|
| 2004 election | Khumo Maoto |
| 2009 election | Wynter Mmolotsi |
| 2014 election | Wynter Mmolotsi |
| 2019 election | Wynter Mmolotsi |
| 2024 election | Wynter Mmolotsi |

== Election results ==
=== 2024 election ===
General election 2024: Francistown South
| Party | Candidate | Votes | % | ±% |
|---|---|---|---|---|
| UDC | Wynter Mmolotsi | 6,506 | 67.71 | +37.18 |
| BDP | Solly Reikeletseng | 1,397 | 14.54 | −17.03 |
| BCP | Interest Tawele | 942 | 9.80 | N/A |
| BPF | Modiri Lucas | 763 | 7.94 | N/A |
| Margin of victory | | 5,109 | 53.17 | N/A |
| Total valid votes | | 9,608 | 99.54 | −0.08 |
| Rejected ballots | | 34 | 0.38 | +0.08 |
| Turnout | | 9,642 | 78.72 | −2.71 |
| Registered electors | | 12,248 | | |
| UDC gain from AP | | Swing | +27.11 | |

=== 2019 election ===
General election 2019: Francistown South
| Party | Candidate | Votes | % | ±% |
|---|---|---|---|---|
| AP | Wynter Mmolotsi | 3,454 | 37.89 | N/A |
| BDP | Lucas Jojo | 2,878 | 31.57 | −1.12 |
| UDC | Tiroeaone Ntsima | 2,783 | 30.53 | −21.76 |
| Margin of victory | | 576 | 6.23 | N/A |
| Total valid votes | | 9,115 | 99.62 | −0.09 |
| Rejected ballots | | 37 | 0.38 | +0.09 |
| Turnout | | 9,152 | 81.43 | −0.43 |
| Registered electors | | 11,239 | | |
| AP gain from UDC | | Swing | N/A | |

=== 2014 election ===
General election 2014: Francistown South
| Party | Candidate | Votes | % | ±% |
|---|---|---|---|---|
| UDC | Wynter Mmolotsi | 5,261 | 52.29 | N/A |
| BDP | Sylvia Muzila | 3,289 | 32.69 | −16.26 |
| BCP | Vain Mamela | 1,511 | 15.02 | −28.11 |
| Margin of victory | | 1,972 | 19.60 | N/A |
| Total valid votes | | 10,061 | 99.64 | +0.30 |
| Rejected ballots | | 36 | 0.36 | −0.30 |
| Turnout | | 10,097 | 81.86 | +9.99 |
| Registered electors | | 12,334 | | |
| UDC gain from BDP | | Swing | +34.28 | |

=== 2009 election ===
General election 2009: Francistown South
| Party | Candidate | Votes | % | ±% |
|---|---|---|---|---|
| BDP | Wynter Mmolotsi | 4,024 | 48.95 | +3.64 |
| BCP | Vain Mamela | 3,546 | 43.13 | +0.85 |
| BPP | Bernard Balikani | 289 | 3.52 | N/A |
| BNF | Joseph Mumba | 280 | 3.41 | N/A |
| Independent | Elmon Tafa | 56 | 0.68 | N/A |
| MELS | Tobokani Amos | 26 | 0.32 | N/A |
| Margin of victory | | 478 | 5.82 | +2.80 |
| Total valid votes | | 8,221 | 99.34 | +0.88 |
| Rejected ballots | | 55 | 0.66 | −0.88 |
| Turnout | | 8,276 | 71.87 | +1.68 |
| Registered electors | | 11,515 | | |
| BDP hold | | Swing | +2.25 | |

=== 2004 election ===
General election 2004: Francistown South
| Party | Candidate | Votes | % |
|---|---|---|---|
| BDP | Khumo Maoto | 2,843 | 45.31 |
| BCP | Vain Mamela | 2,653 | 42.28 |
| BAM | Matlhomola Modise | 779 | 12.41 |
| Margin of victory | | 190 | 3.03 |
| Total valid votes | | 6,275 | 98.46 |
| Rejected ballots | | 98 | 1.54 |
| Turnout | | 6,373 | 70.19 |
| Registered electors | | 9,079 | |
| BDP win (new seat) | | | |
