= Otse, Central District =

Coordinates: 23°19′41″S 25°51′58″E

Location of Otse

Otse is a village in Central District of Botswana. It is located CA. 100 km west of Mahalapye. Otse has a primary school, and the population was 973 in 2001 census.
