= Tshelang Masisi =

Motswana politician, c. 1960-2013

- Born: Tshelang Walter Masisi; 1960; Moshupa, Botswana
- Died: August 28, 2013 (aged 52–53); Mmopane, Kweneng District, Botswana
- Other name: TW
- Occupation: Politician
- Years active: 1980s-2013
- Known for: Member of the Pan-African Parliament and Parliament of Botswana; brother to president Mokgweetsi Masisi
- Spouse: Ntetleng Masisi
- Family: Edison Masisi (father); Mokgweetsi Masisi (brother)

Tshelang Walter Masisi (c. 1960- August 28, 2013) was a Motswana politician. He was an elder brother to president Mokgweetsi Masisi and served as a member of the Pan-African Parliament, as well as the Parliament of Botswana, representing Francistown West for the Botswana Democratic Party from 1999 until his death in 2013.

Masisi was the son of Edison Masisi (1921–2003), the long-time MP for Moshupa and many-time cabinet member. One of his three brothers, Mokgweetsi, has served as the President of Botswana since 2018, while another is a retired army general. He also had a sister, Phadi.

== Death ==
In 2000, Masisi was diagnosed with a kidney condition and was given a transplant from his wife, Ntetleng. After the surgery, he subsequently opened an organ bank to aid others. In 2012, one year before his death, Masisi and his wife suffered a near-fatal car accident on A1 Highway near Palapye while traveling to Francistown.

On August 25, 2013, Masisi was transported to Bokamoso Private Hospital in Mmopane (also said to be located in Metsimotlhabe) before being transferred to Milpark Hospital in Johannesburg for surgery, but was sent back to Bokamoso amid complications with the procedure. Masisi died of a stroke in the early morning of the day after arriving back in Botswana. Later in the evening, family spokesperson Thulaganyo Masisi confirmed his death.
