= Mmutlane =

- Village
- Location in Botswana
- Coordinates: 23°02′46″S 26°34′37″E
- Country: Botswana
- District: Central District

Population (2001)
  - Total: 841

Mmutlane, also known as Mmutlana, is a village in the Central District of Botswana. It is located 30 km north-west of Mahalapye, close to the village of Shoshong. Mmutlane has a primary school, and the population was 841 in the 2001 census.
