= Tropic of Capricorn =

Line of southernmost latitude at which the Sun can be directly overhead

World map showing the Tropic of Capricorn

Relationship of Earth's axial tilt (ε) to the tropical and polar circles

The Tropic of Capricorn is the circle of latitude that contains the subsolar point at the December solstice. It is thus the southernmost latitude where the Sun can be seen directly overhead. Similarly, at the latitude of the Tropic of Capricorn, at solar midnight on the June solstice, the Sun will be 90 degrees below the horizon in all directions. The Tropic of Capricorn is one of the five major circles of latitude typically marked on maps of Earth. Its latitude is currently 23°26′08.9″ (or 23.4358°) south of the Equator, but it is very gradually moving northward, currently at the rate of 0.47 arcseconds, or 15 metres, per year.

It is the southern of the two tropics: its Northern Hemisphere counterpart is the Tropic of Cancer.

== Name ==
When this line of latitude was named, the Sun was in the zodiacal Capricorn at the northern solstice. This is the date each year when the Sun reaches zenith at this latitude, the southernmost declination it reaches for the year. (Due to the precession of the equinoxes the Sun currently appears in the zodiacal Sagittarius at this solstice.)

== Geography and environment ==
The Tropic of Capricorn is the dividing line between the Southern Temperate Zone to the south and the Tropics to the north. The Northern Hemisphere equivalent of the Tropic of Capricorn is the Tropic of Cancer.

The Tropic of Capricorn's position is not fixed, but constantly changes because of a slight wobble in the Earth's longitudinal alignment relative to its orbit around the Sun. Earth's axial tilt varies over a 41,000 year period from about 22.1 to 24.5 degrees and currently resides at about 23.4 degrees. This wobble means that the Tropic of Capricorn is currently drifting northward at a rate of almost half an arcsecond (0.468″) of latitude, or 15 metres, per year (it was at exactly 23°27′S in 1917 and will be at 23°26'S in 2045). Therefore, the distance between Arctic Circle and the Tropic of Capricorn is essentially constant moving in tandem. See under circles of latitude for information.

There are approximately 10 hours and 41 minutes of daylight during the June solstice (Southern Hemisphere winter). During the December solstice (Southern Hemisphere summer), there are 13 hours and 35 minutes of daylight. The length of the Tropic of Capricorn at 23°26′11.7″S is 36,788 km (22,859 mi).

=== Africa ===
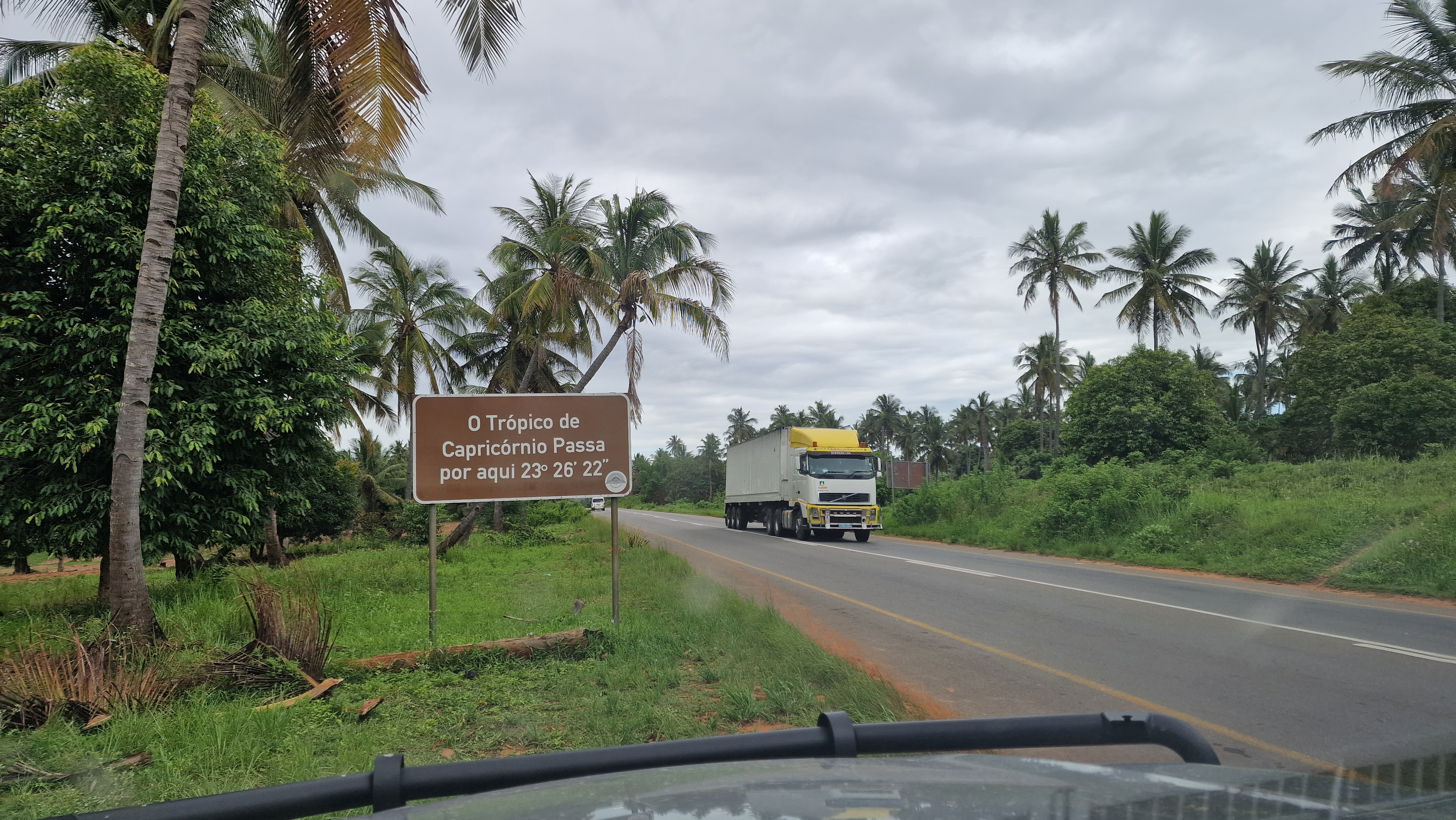
Sign marking the Tropic of Capricorn in Mozambique.

In most of this belt of southern Africa, a minimum of seasonal rainfall is reliable and farming is possible, though yields struggle to compete with for example the Mississippi basin, even against like-to-like soil fertilisers. Rivers have been successfully dammed particularly flowing from relief precipitation areas (high eminences) and those from the edge of the Great Rift Valley, such as the Zambezi, well within the Tropics. This, with alluvial or enriched soil, enables substantial yield grain farming in areas with good soil. Across this large region pasture farming is widespread, where intensive, brief and rotational it helps to fertilise and stabilise the soil, preventing run-off and desertification. This approach is traditional to many tribes and promoted by government advisors such as Allan Savory, a Zimbabwean-born biologist, farmer, game rancher, politician and international consultant and co-founder of the Savory Institute. According to the United Nations University Our World dissemination he is credited with developing "holistic management" in the 1960s and has led anti-desertification efforts in Africa for decades using a counterintuitive approach to most developed economies of increasing the number of livestock on grasslands rather than fencing them off for conservation. Such practices in this area have seen success and won generous awards; he gave the keynote speech at UNCCD's Land Day in 2018, and later that year a TED (conference) address, widely re-broadcast.

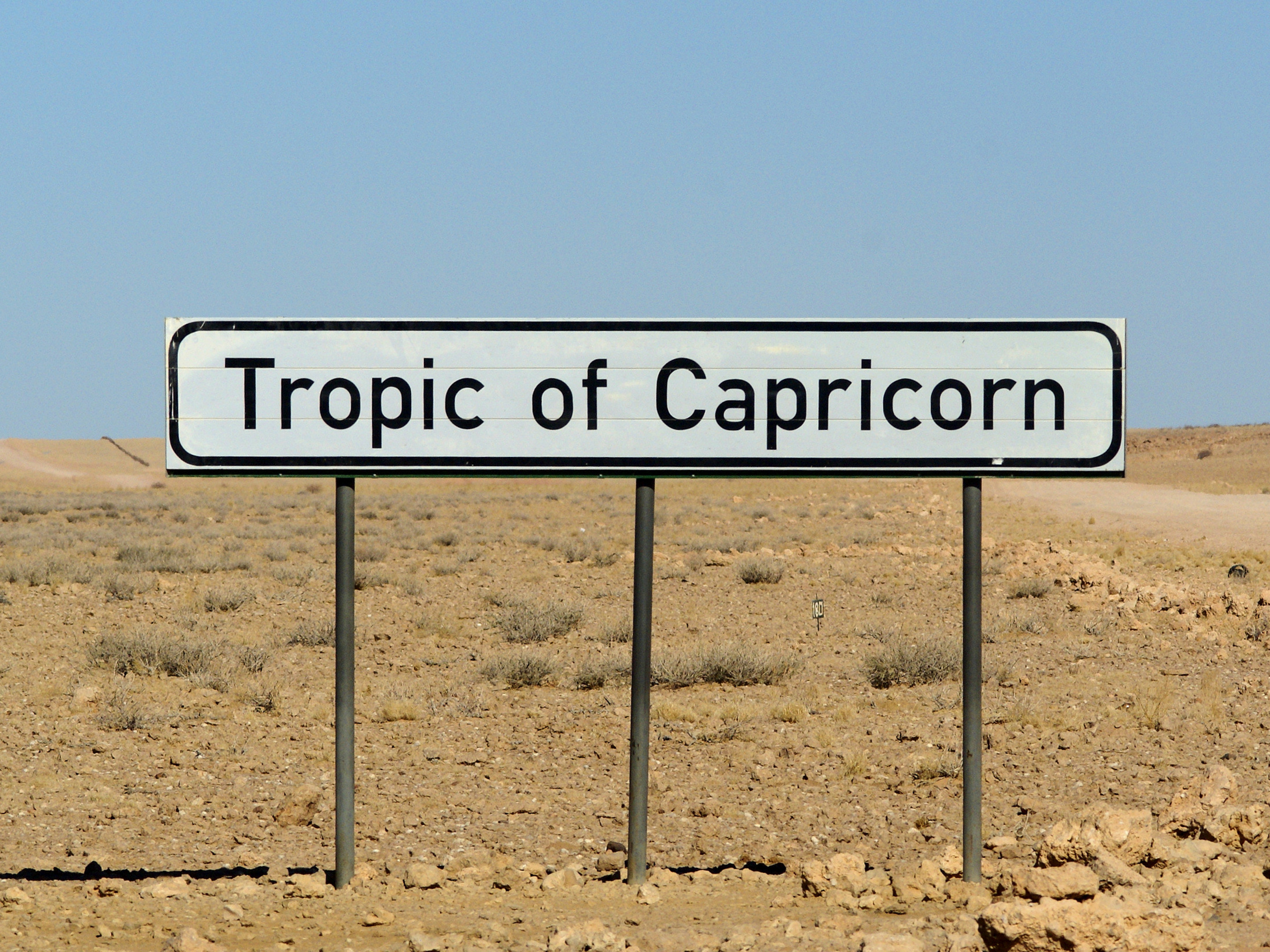
A sign marking the Tropic of Capricorn as it passes through Namibia

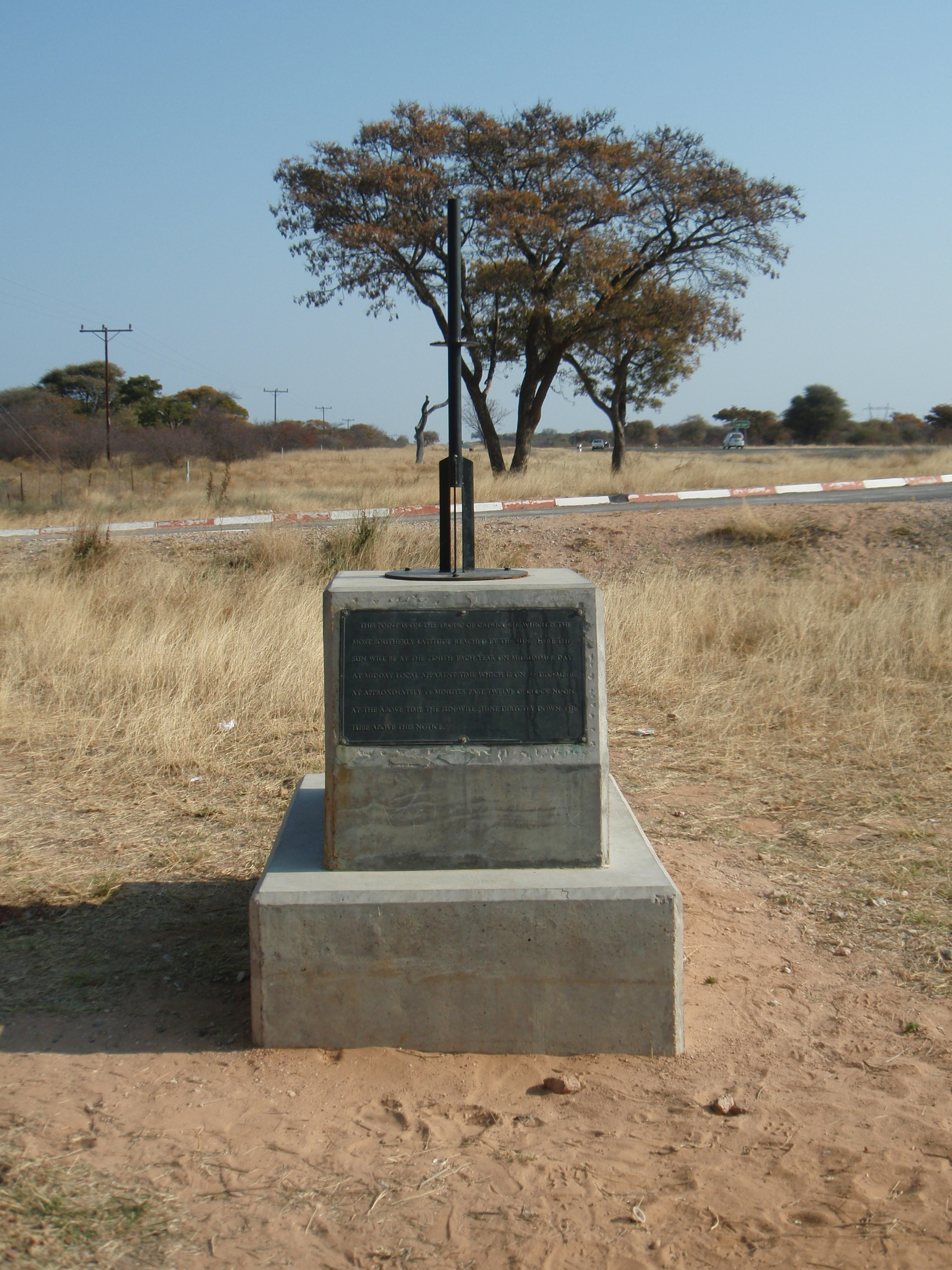
A monument marking the Tropic of Capricorn as it passes through Botswana

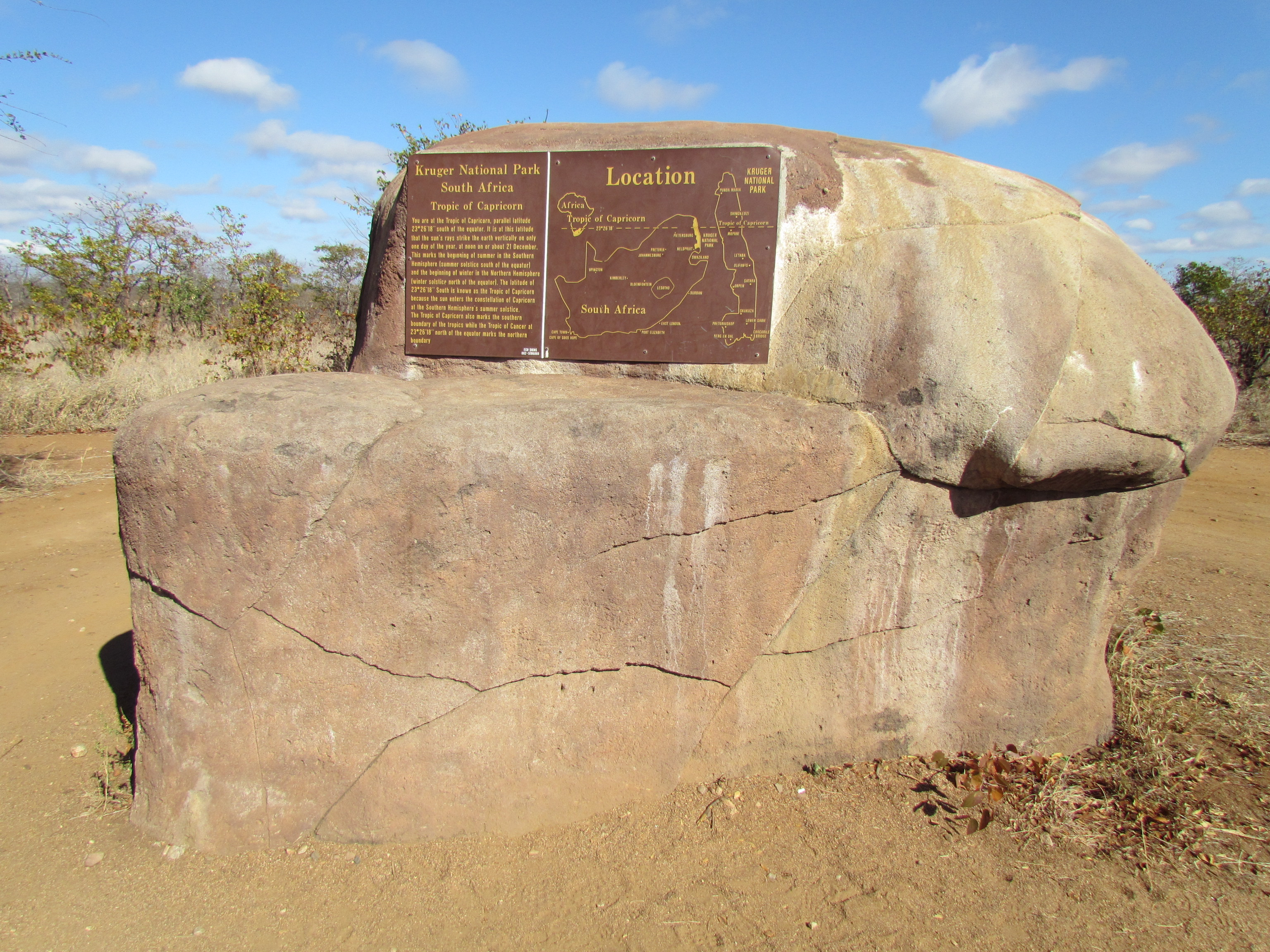
A monument in Kruger National Park, South Africa

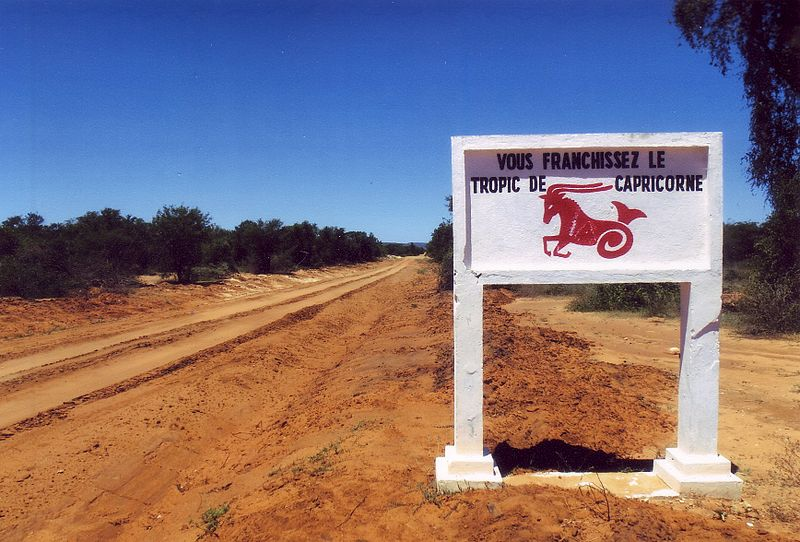
A sign marking the Tropic of Capricorn in Atsimo-Andrefana Region, Madagascar

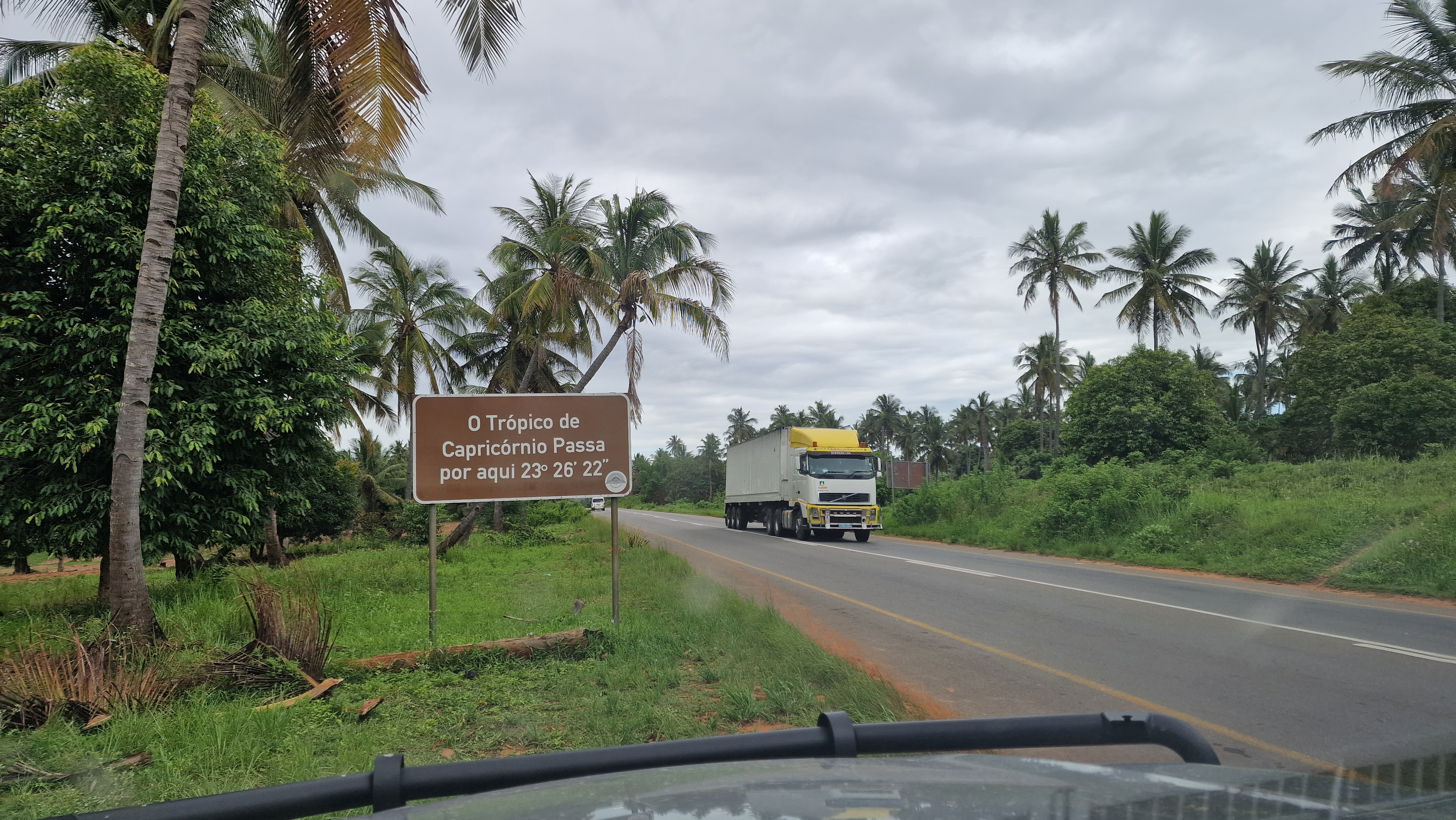
A sign at the Mozambican line

=== Australia ===
In Australia, areas around the Tropic have some of the world's most variable rainfall. In the east advanced plants such as flowering shrubs and eucalyptus and in most bioregions grasses have adapted to cope with means such as deep roots and little transpiration. Wetter areas, seasonally watered, are widely pasture farmed. As to animals, birds and marsupials are well-adapted. Naturally difficult arable agriculture specialises in dry fruits, nuts and modest water consumption produce. Other types are possible given reliable irrigation sources and, ideally, water-retentive enriched or alluvial soils, especially wheat; shallow irrigation sources very widely dry up in and after drought years. The multi-ridge Great Dividing Range brings relief precipitation enough to make hundreds of kilometres either side cultivable, and its rivers are widely dammed to store necessary water; this benefits the settled areas of New South Wales and Queensland.

Behind the end of the green hills, away from the Pacific, which is subject to warm, negative phases of the El Niño–Southern Oscillation (colloquially this is an "El Niño year/season") is a white, red and yellow landscape of 2,800 to 3,300 kilometres of rain shadow heading west in turn feature normally arid cattle lands of the Channel Country, the white Kati Thanda-Lake Eyre National Park, the mainly red Mamungari Conservation Park, then the Gibson Desert, after others the dry landscape settlement of Kalbarri on the west coast and its rest, northward. The Channel Country features an arid landscape with a series of ancient flood plains from rivers which only flow intermittently. The principal rivers are Georgina River, Cooper Creek and the Diamantina River. In most years, their waters are absorbed into the earth or evaporate, but when there is sufficient rainfall in their catchment area, these rivers flow into Lake Eyre, South Australia. One of the most significant rainfall events occurred in 2010 when a monsoonal low from ex-Cyclone Olga created a period of exceptional rainfall.

El Niño adverse phases cause a shift in atmospheric circulation; rainfall becomes reduced over Indonesia and Australia, rainfall and tropical cyclone formation increases over the tropical Pacific. The low-level surface trade winds, which normally blow from east to west along the equator, either weaken or start blowing from the other direction.

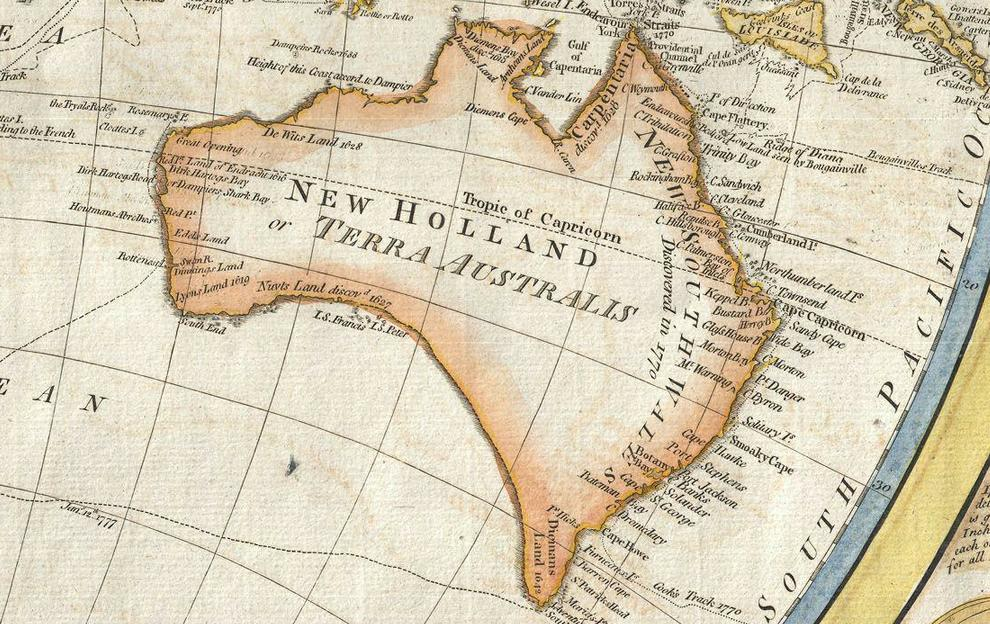
Tropic of Capricorn as it runs through Australia in the 1794 Dunn Map of the World

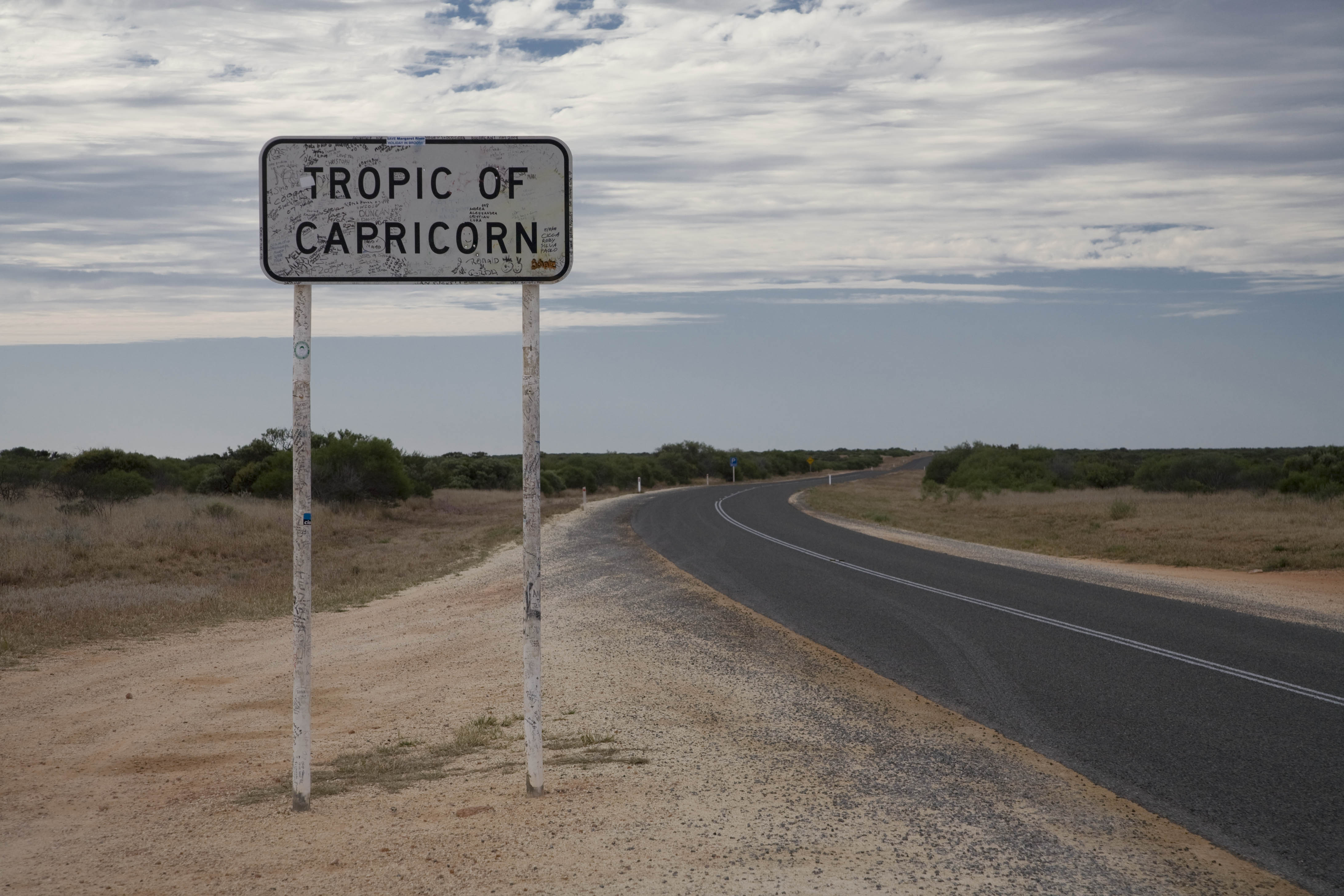
Road sign marking Tropic of Capricorn in Western Australia

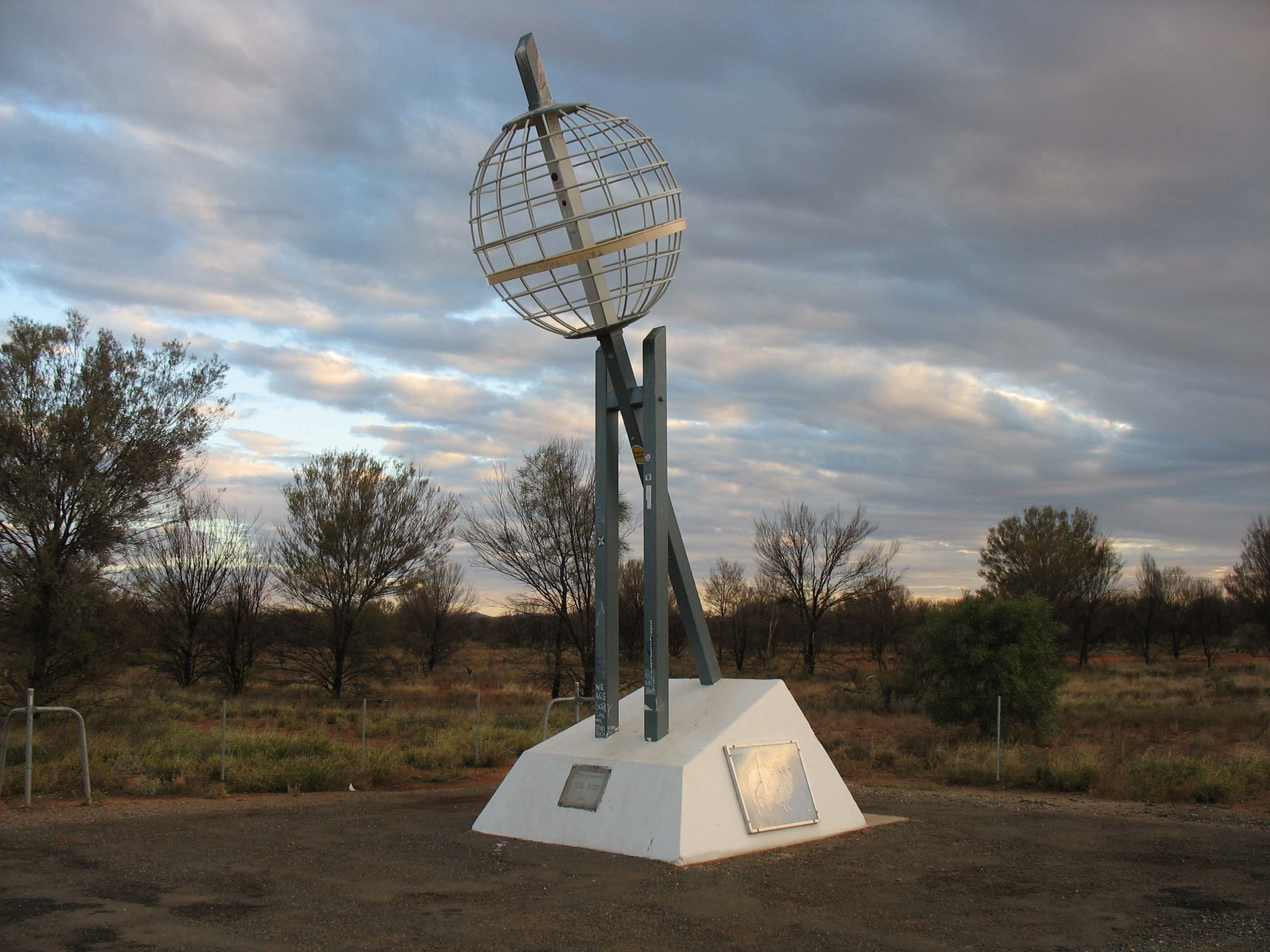
Monument marking the Tropic of Capricorn just north of Alice Springs, Northern Territory

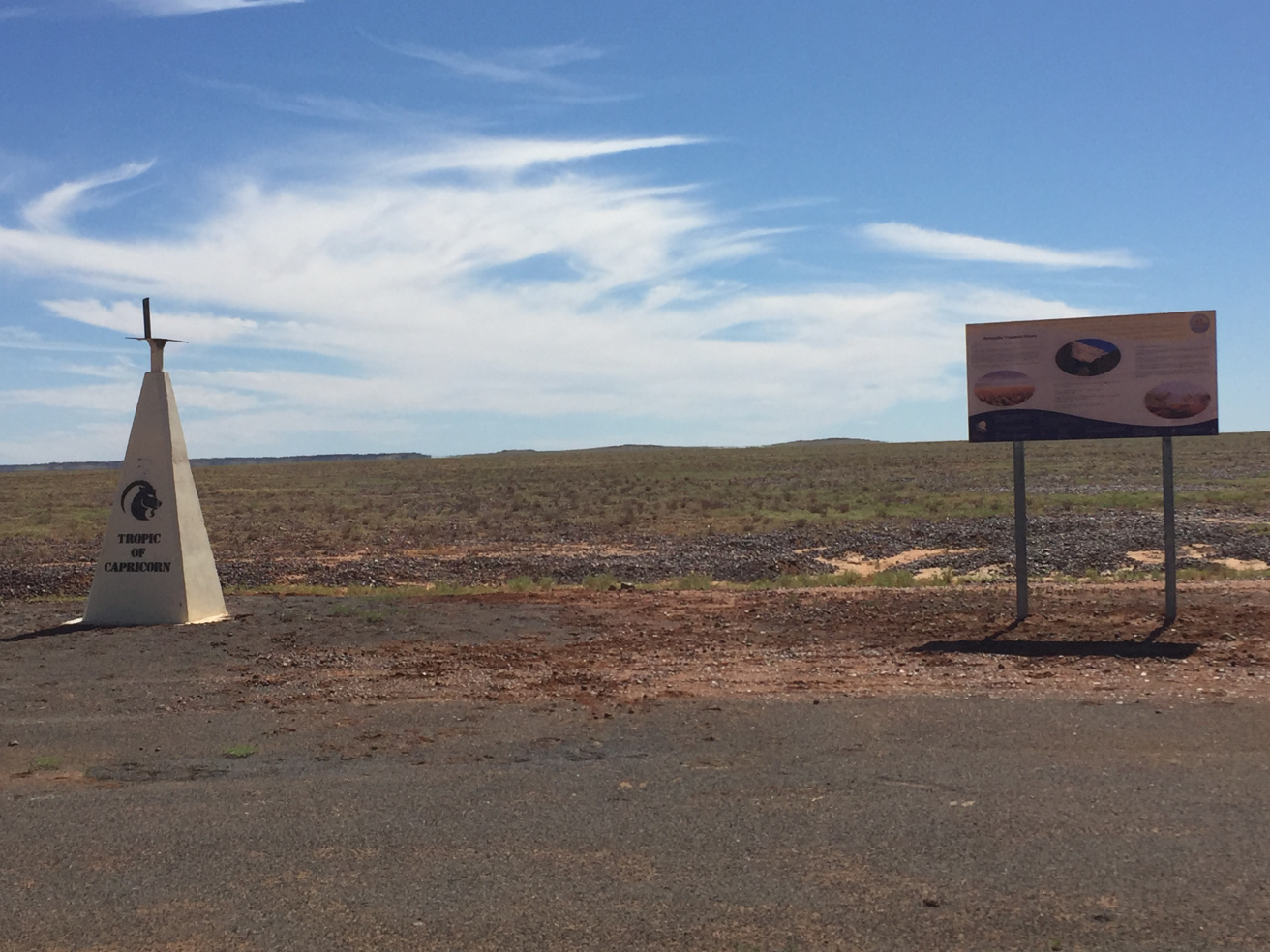
Tropic of Capricorn on the Diamantina Developmental Road, Amaroo, Queensland

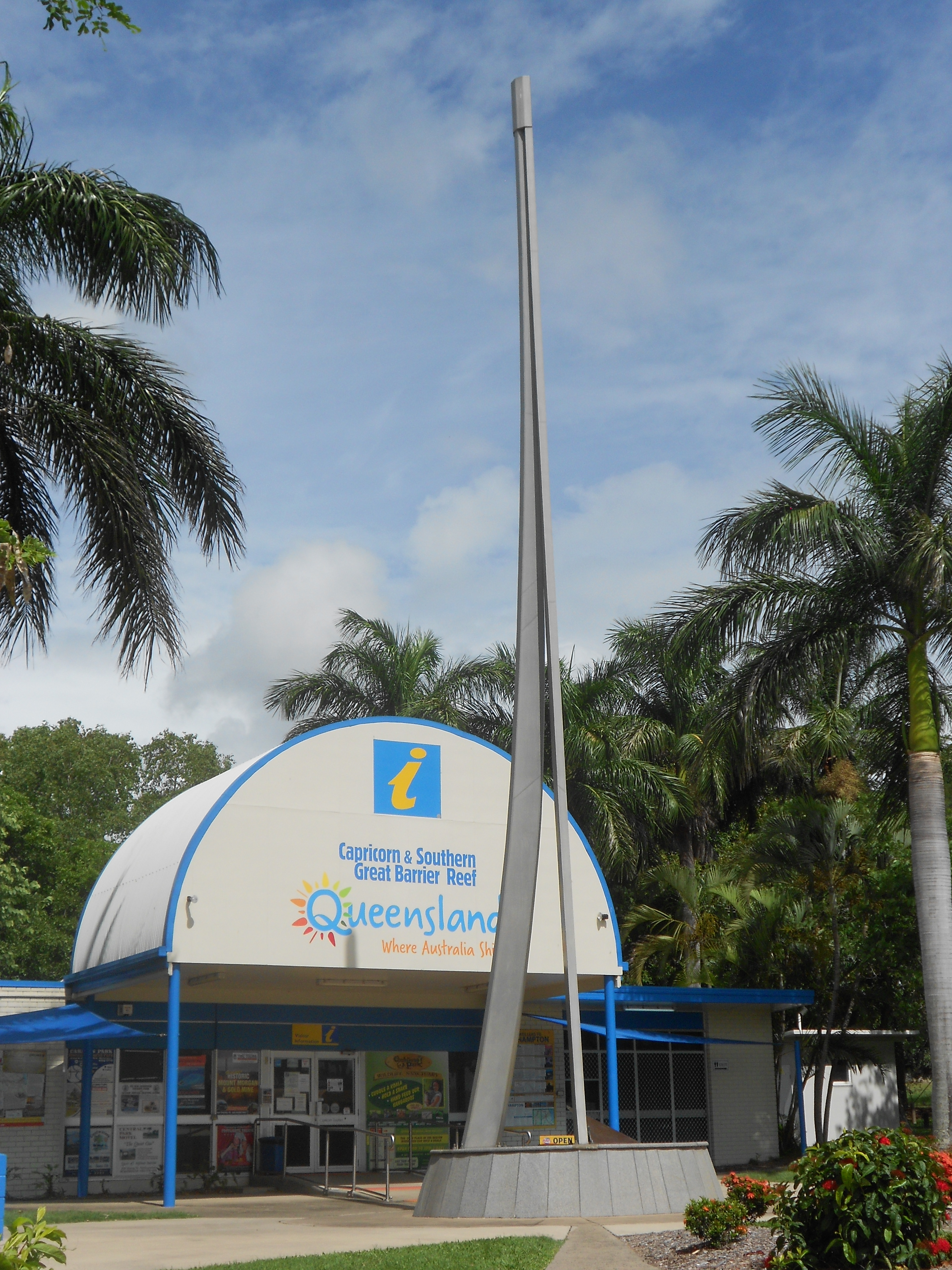
Spire marking Tropic of Capricorn in Rockhampton, Queensland (4 km north of the actual Tropic of Capricorn)

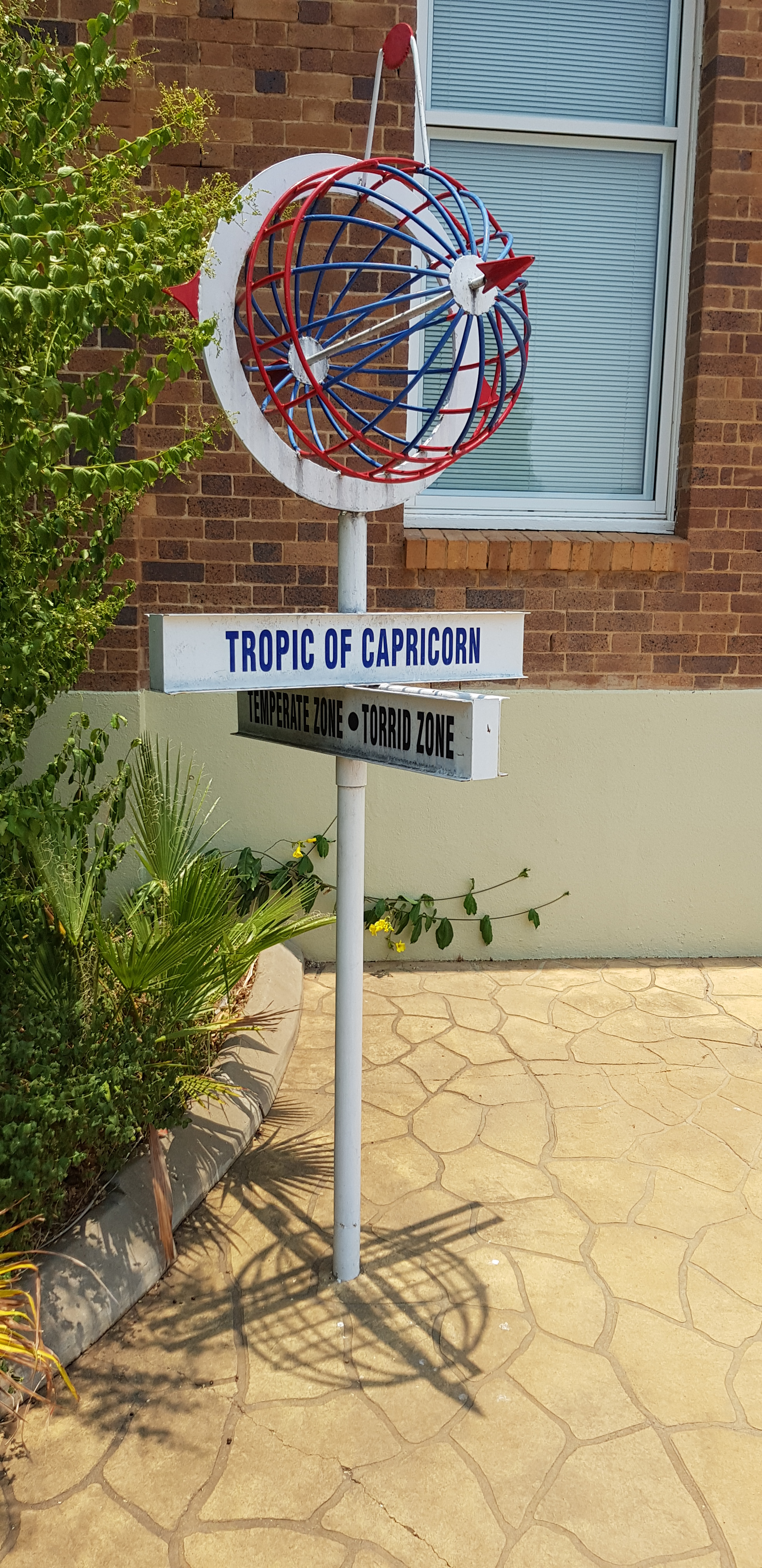
Monument marking Tropic of Capricorn near Civic Centre, Longreach, at mid-day of Summer solstice 2019. The monument is few arc seconds south of the Tropic of Capricorn (notice the shadow directly below the sign)

=== South America ===
In South America, whilst in the continental craton soils are almost as old as in Australia and Southern Africa, the presence of the geologically young and evolving Andes means that this region is on the western side of the subtropical anticyclones and thus receives warm and humid air from the Atlantic Ocean. As a result, areas in Brazil adjacent to the Tropic are impressively productive agricultural regions, producing large quantities of crops such as sugarcane, and the natural rainforest vegetation has been almost entirely cleared, except for a few remaining patches of Atlantic Forest. Further south in Argentina, the temperate grasslands of the Pampas region is equally influential in wheat, soybeans, maize, and beef, making the country one of the largest worldwide agricultural exporters, similar to the role played by the Prairies region in Canada.

West of the Andes, which creates a rain shadow, the air is further cooled and dried by the cold Humboldt Current which makes it very arid, creating the Atacama Desert, one of the driest in the world, so that no glaciers exist between Volcán Sajama at 18˚30'S and Cerro Tres Cruces at 27˚S. Vegetation here is almost non-existent, though on the eastern slopes of the Andes rainfall is adequate for rainfed agriculture.

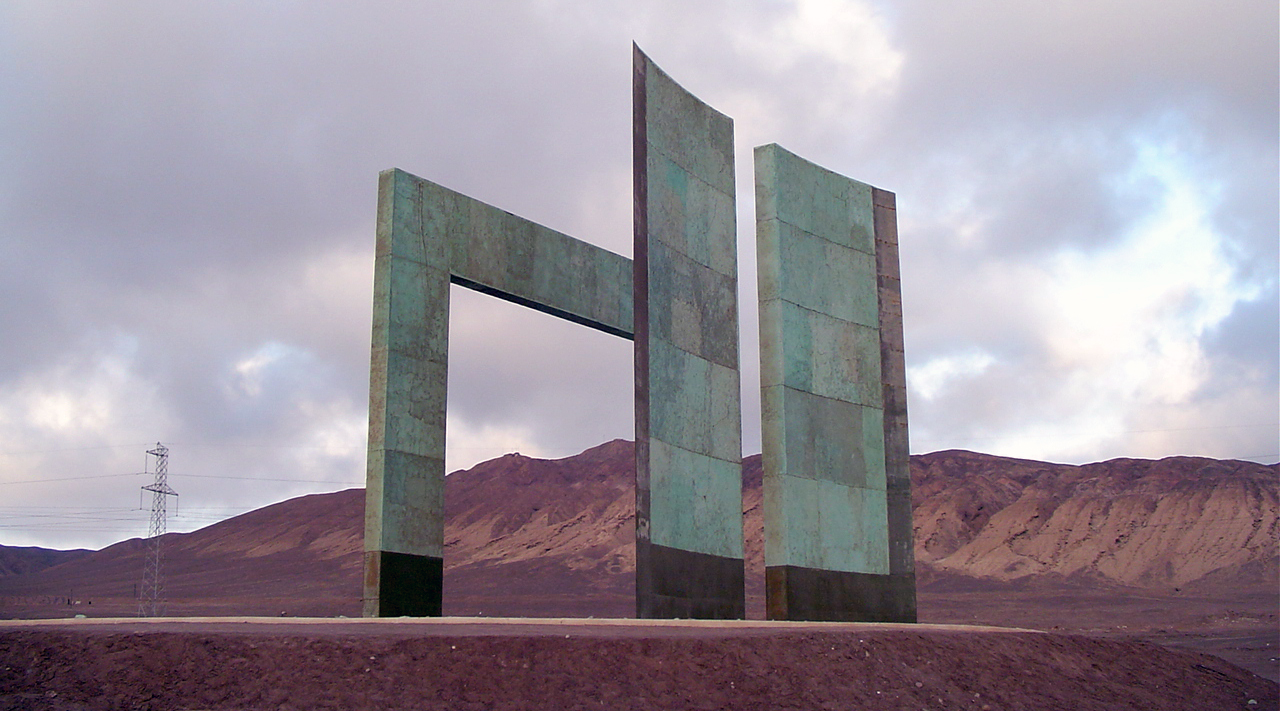
Monument marking the Tropic of Capricorn just north of Antofagasta, Chile

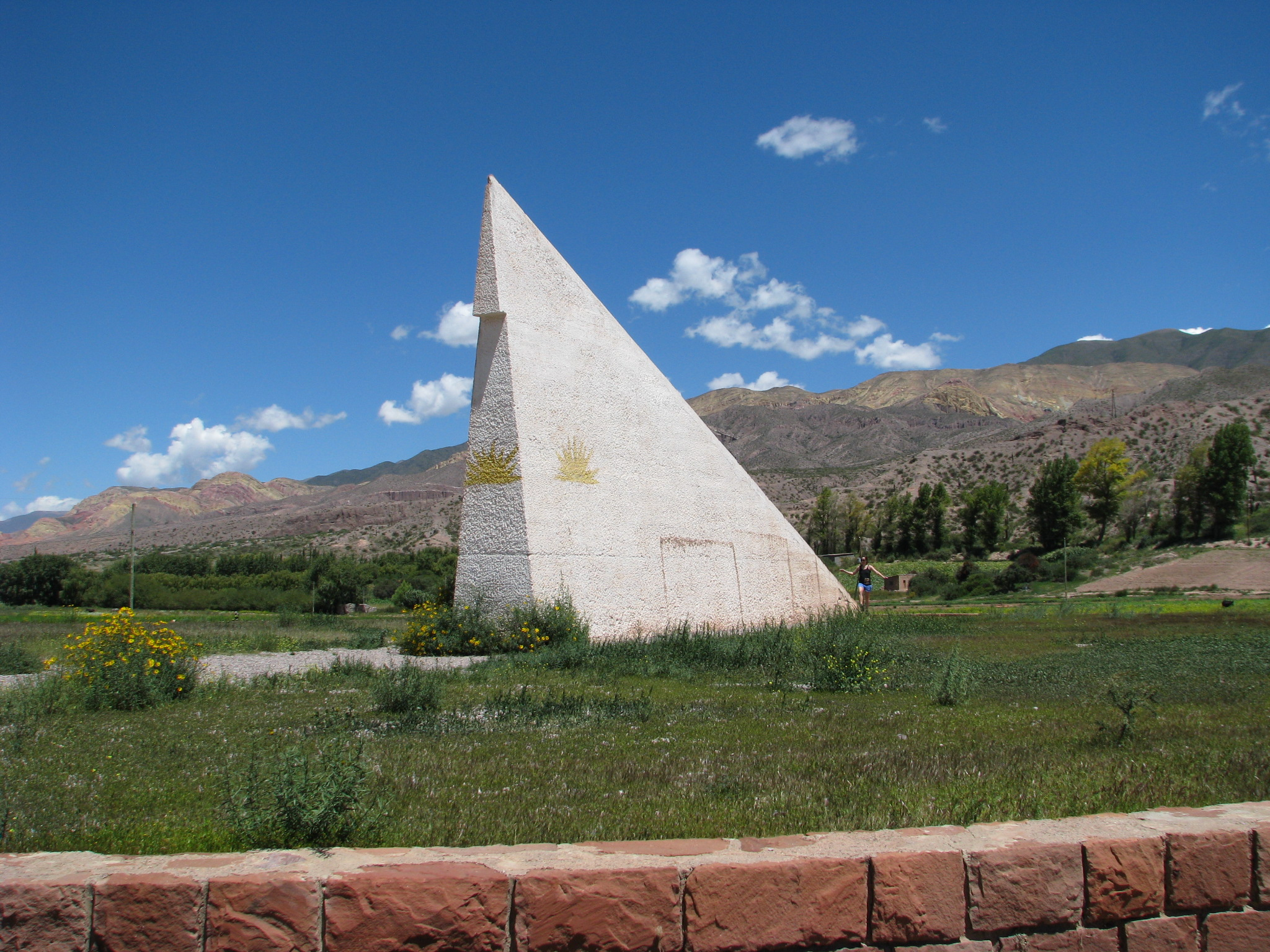
Sundial on the Tropic of Capricorn, Jujuy Province, Argentina

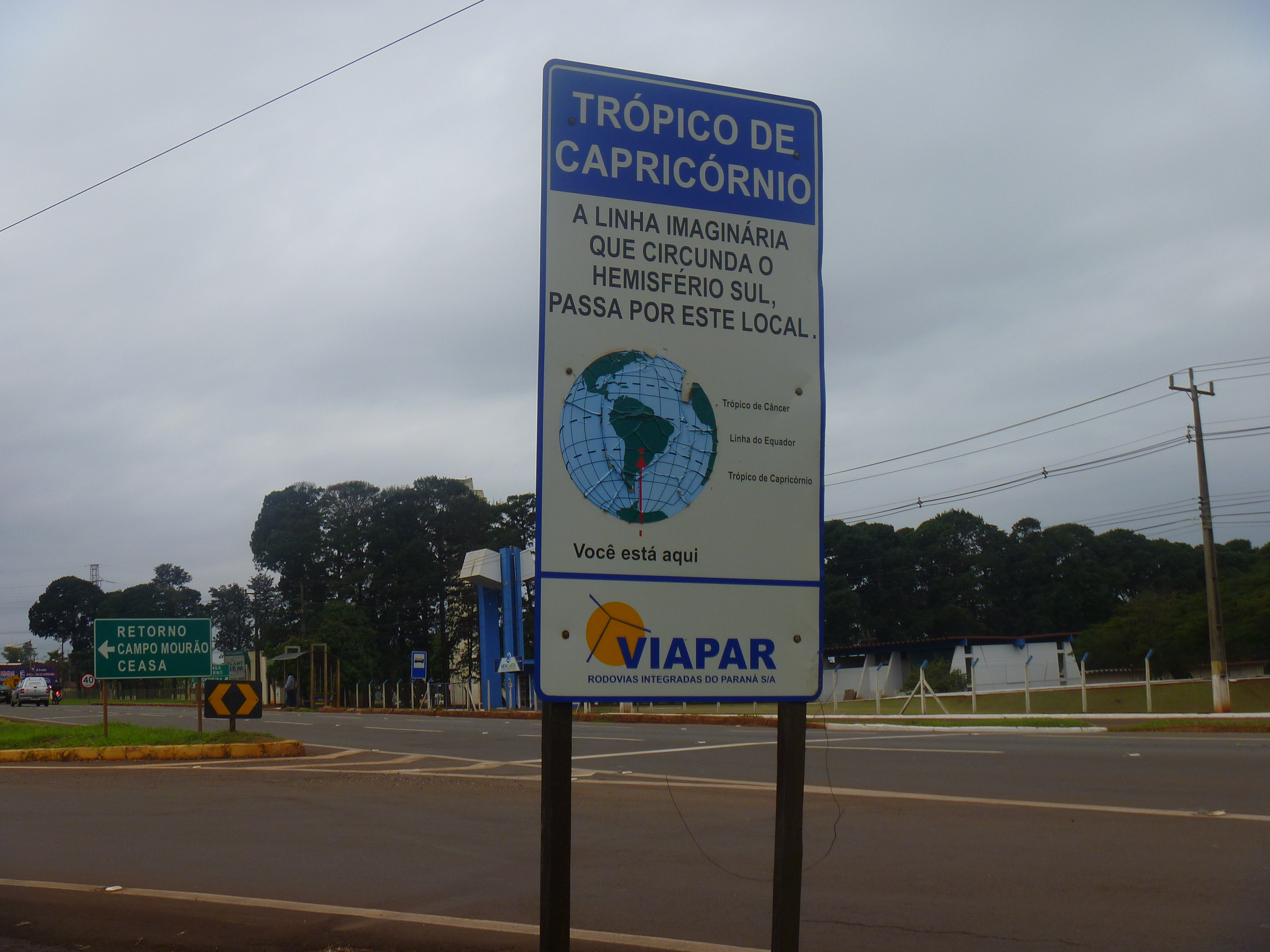
Sign marking the tropic in Maringá, Brazil

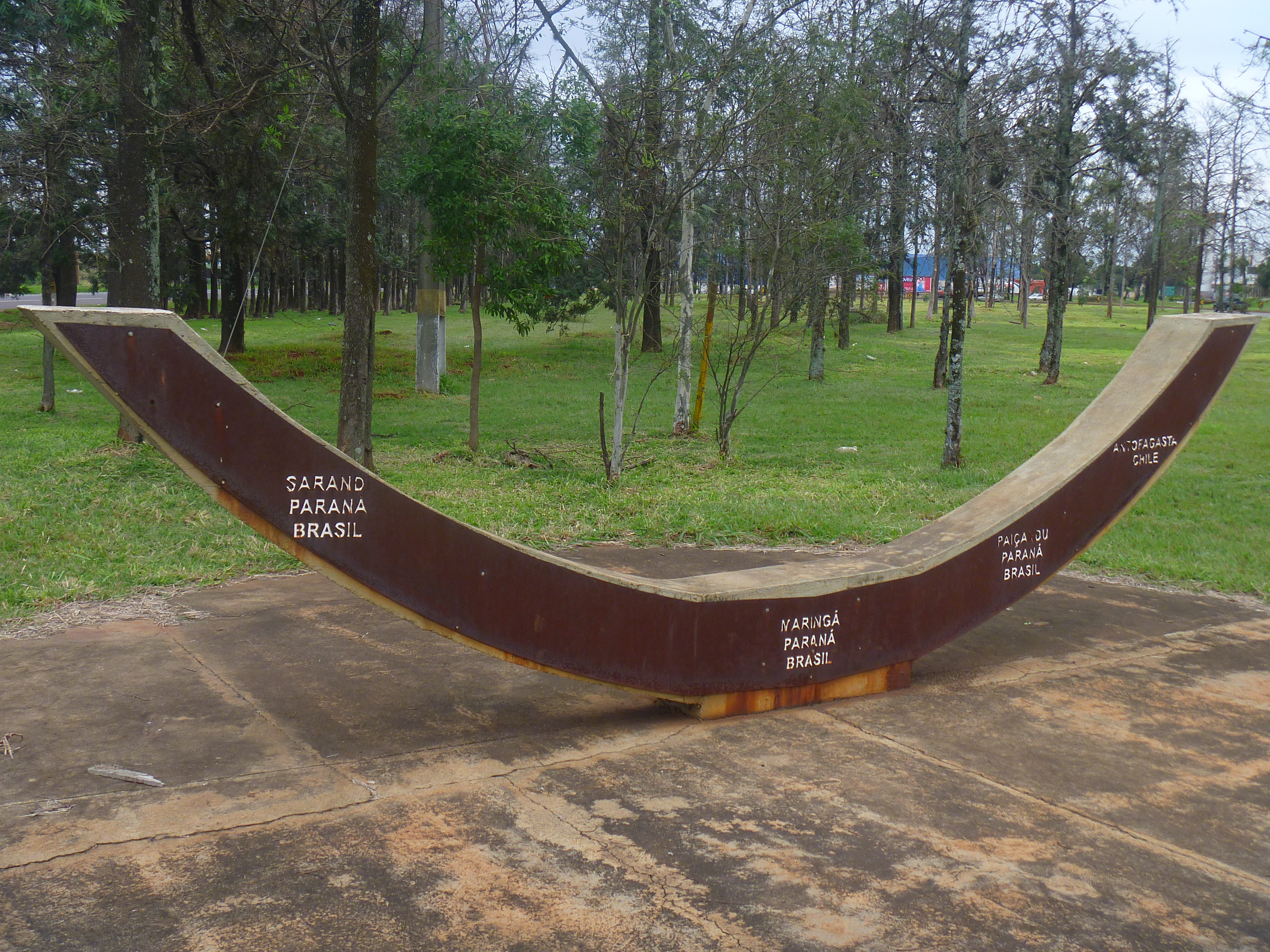
Marker for the tropic in Maringá, Paraná, Brazil

== Around the world ==
Starting at the Prime Meridian and heading eastwards, the Tropic of Capricorn passes through 10 countries:

Co-ordinates (approximate)	Country, territory or ocean	Notes
23°26′S 0°0′E	Atlantic Ocean	
23°26′S 14°27′E	Namibia	Erongo, Khomas, Hardap, Khomas (again), and Omaheke regions
23°26′S 20°0′E	Botswana	Kgalagadi, Kweneng and Central districts
23°26′S 27°18′E	South Africa	Limpopo Province
23°26′S 31°33′E	Mozambique	Gaza and Inhambane provinces
23°26′S 35°26′E	Indian Ocean	Mozambique Channel
23°26′S 43°45′E	Madagascar	Toliara and Fianarantsoa provinces
23°26′S 47°39′E	Indian Ocean	
23°26′S 113°47′E	Australia	Western Australia, Northern Territory and Queensland
23°26′S 151°3′E	Pacific Ocean	Coral Sea; Passing just south of Cato Reef in Australia's Coral Sea Islands Territory
23°26′S 166°46′E	Pacific Ocean	Passing just north of the Minerva Reefs (Tonga), and just south of Tubuai (French Polynesia)
23°26′S 70°36′W	Chile	Antofagasta Region
23°26′S 67°07′W	Argentina	Jujuy, Salta, Jujuy (again), Salta (again) and Formosa provinces
23°26′S 61°23′W	Paraguay	Boquerón, Presidente Hayes, Concepción, San Pedro and Amambay departments
23°26′S 55°38′W	Brazil	Mato Grosso do Sul, Paraná, and São Paulo states
23°26′S 45°2′W	Atlantic Ocean	

== Places located along the Tropic of Capricorn ==
The following cities and landmarks are either located near the Tropic of Capricorn, or the tropic passes through them.

Argentina

- Andes Mountains
- The Chaco
- San Salvador de Jujuy

Australia

- Paraburdoo, Western Australia
- Newman, Western Australia
- Kumpupintil Lake, Western Australia
- Gibson Desert, Western Australia
- Ikuntji, Northern Territory
- Alice Springs, Northern Territory
- Amaroo, Queensland
- Longreach, Queensland
- Great Dividing Range, Queensland
- Emerald, Queensland
- Gracemere, Queensland
- Rockhampton, Queensland
- Cape Capricorn, Queensland

Botswana

- Kalahari Desert
- Khutse Game Reserve
- Kule, Botswana
- Mahalapye

Brazil

- Amambai
- Araçariguama
- Itaquaquecetuba
- Londrina
- Mogi das Cruzes
- Maringá
- Sorocaba
- Santana de Parnaíba
- São Paulo-Guarulhos International Airport
- São Paulo (Tremembé)
- São Roque
- Guarulhos
- Taguaí
- Ubatuba

Chile

- Atacama Desert
- Andes Mountains
- Antofagasta

Madagascar

- Toliara

Mozambique

- Inhambane
- Morrumbene
- Massinga

Namibia

- Walvis Bay
- Swakopmund
- Namib Desert

Paraguay

- Concepción

South Africa

- Kruger National Park
- Polokwane
- Capricorn District Municipality

== List of countries entirely south of the Tropic of Capricorn ==
As most of Earth's land is in the Northern Hemisphere only four countries are wholly south of the Tropic of Capricorn (which contrasts with 73, about one third of the current total, wholly north of the Tropic of Cancer):

- Eswatini (formerly Swaziland)
- Lesotho
- New Zealand (Note: The Cook Islands, Tokelau and Niue, which are part of the Realm of New Zealand, lie north of the Tropic of Capricorn.)
- Uruguay

== See also ==
- Circle of latitude
  - Arctic Circle
  - Tropic of Cancer
  - Equator
  - 23rd parallel south
  - 24th parallel south
  - Antarctic Circle
- Axial tilt
- Milankovitch cycles
- Capricornus
