= Kule, Botswana =

Village in Botswana

Coordinates: 22°59′8″S 20°10′21″E

Location of Kule

Kule is a village in Ghanzi District of Botswana. It is located close to the border with Namibia and has a primary school, clinic, customary court, social and development offices, animal health and production and police offices. The population was 741 in 2001 census.
