= Ikongwe =

Village in Botswana

Coordinates: 23°7′54″S 26°25′30″E

Location of Ikongwe

Ikongwe is a village in Central District of Botswana. It is located 63 km west of Mahalapye. The village has a primary school, and the population was 471 in 2001 census.
