= Bonwapitse =

Village in Botswana

- Location within Botswana
- Coordinates: 23.03921889600°S 26.64476300893°E
- Country: Botswana
- District: Central

Population (2001)
  - Total: 544
- Time zone: UTC+2:00 (CAT)

Bonwapitse is a village in Central District of Botswana. The village is located 14 km north-west of Mahalapye, and it has a primary school. The population was 544 in 2001 census.
