= Mahalapye =

- Location within Botswana
- Coordinates: 23°06′S 26°48′E
- Country: Botswana
- District: Central District

Government
  - Mayor: TBA
- Elevation: 1,009 m (3,310 ft)

Population (2012)
  - Total: 41,316
- Time zone: GMT +2
- Climate: BSh
- Website: http://mahalapye.cdc.gov.bw/

Mahalapye is a town located in the Central District of Botswana. The town has about 41,000 inhabitants and is situated along the main road between the capital Gaborone and the second most populous city Francistown. Mahalapye has a bus station, a railway station, a couple of hotels and a market area with many shops and fast food restaurants, Water Shed mall is the latest attraction to those travelling from Gaborone to Francistown. It also has several petrol stations, some open 24 hours per day. Being situated on the edge of the Kalahari desert, the town and its local waterways are quite dry, except during the rainy season. In recent times, it has become a convenient stop-over town for travelers travelling to and from Gaborone.

This town is located on the Tropic of Capricorn. Thus at approximately 13:11 hours on 21 December, or at solar noon on Summer Solstice, the sun will be directly overhead at this site. To mark this geographic feature there is a small monument just outside town on the 23rd parallel, or 23 degrees South of the equator. At this time the sun is directly above this monument where the sun reaches its furthest point South. At this point there is no shadow on the monument. The highest temperature ever registered in Mahalapye was 41.9 °C (107.4 °F). The lowest temperature registered in Mahalapye was −6.0 °C (21.2 °F).

The Botswana Prison Service (BPS) operates the Mahalapye Prison.

== Notable people ==
Actor, writer and playwright Donald Molosi was born in Mahalapye in 1985.

Duma Boko, president of Botswana was born in Mahalapye in 1969.

== See also ==
- Bonwapitse
